= Government of New Hampshire =

Government of the U.S. state of New Hampshire

- Great Seal of the State of New Hampshire
- Polity type: Sub-national administrative division (federated state)
- Part of: United States of America
- Constitution: Constitution of New Hampshire

Legislative branch
- Name: General Court
- Type: Bicameral
- Meeting place: New Hampshire State House
- Upper house
- Name: Senate
- Presiding officer: Jeb Bradley, President
- Lower house
- Name: House of Representatives
- Presiding officer: Sherman Packard, Speaker

Executive branch
- Head of state and government
- Title: Governor
- Currently: Kelly Ayotte
- Appointer: Election
- Cabinet
- Leader: Governor
- Deputy leader: President of the Senate
- Headquarters: State House

Judicial branch
- Name: Judiciary of New Hampshire
- Courts: Courts of New Hampshire
- New Hampshire Supreme Court
- Chief judge: Gordon J. MacDonald
- Seat: Concord

The State of New Hampshire has a republican form of government modeled after the Government of the United States, with three branches: the executive, consisting of the Governor of New Hampshire, the elected Executive Council, and subordinate agencies; the legislative, called the New Hampshire General Court, which includes the Senate and the House of Representatives; and the judicial, consisting of the Supreme Court of New Hampshire and lower courts.

The New Hampshire state capital is Concord. The capital was Portsmouth during colonial times, and Exeter from 1775 to 1808. The Governor's office, some other executive offices, and both legislative chambers are in the State House. The Legislative Office Building is behind the State House in this photograph; the state Supreme Court and other agencies are in an office park on the other (east) side of the Merrimack River.

== Federal representatives ==
Like all states, New Hampshire has two senators in the U.S. Senate. Based on U.S. census data, New Hampshire has two members of the U.S. House of Representatives.

=== Congressional districts ===
The 1st congressional district consists of the Carroll and Strafford counties: Alton, Barnstead, Belmont, Center Harbor, Gilford, Gilmanton, Laconia, Meredith and New Hampton in Belknap County; Bedford, Goffstown, Manchester and Merrimack in Hillsborough County; Hooksett in Merrimack County; and all of Rockingham County, except Atkinson, Salem and Windham.

The 2nd congressional district is the remainder of the state, lying to the west and north of the 1st district.

Congressional delegation of New Hampshire
| Chamber | District | Official | Party | First elected | Term expires |
|---|---|---|---|---|---|
| U.S. Senate | At-Large | Jeanne Shaheen | Democratic | 2009 | 2027 |
| U.S. Senate | At-Large | Maggie Hassan | Democratic | 2017 | 2029 |
| U.S. House of Representatives | 1st | Chris Pappas | Democratic | 2019 | 2027 |
| U.S. House of Representatives | 2nd | Maggie Goodlander | Democratic | 2025 | 2027 |

=== Electoral College ===
Based on the total number of its Congressional delegation, New Hampshire has four votes in the Electoral College. The state awards its electoral votes on a winner-take-all basis.

=== Federal judiciary ===
New Hampshire is part of the United States District Court for the District of New Hampshire in the federal judiciary. The district's cases are appealed to the Boston-based United States Court of Appeals for the First Circuit.

== Governing documents ==
=== State constitution ===
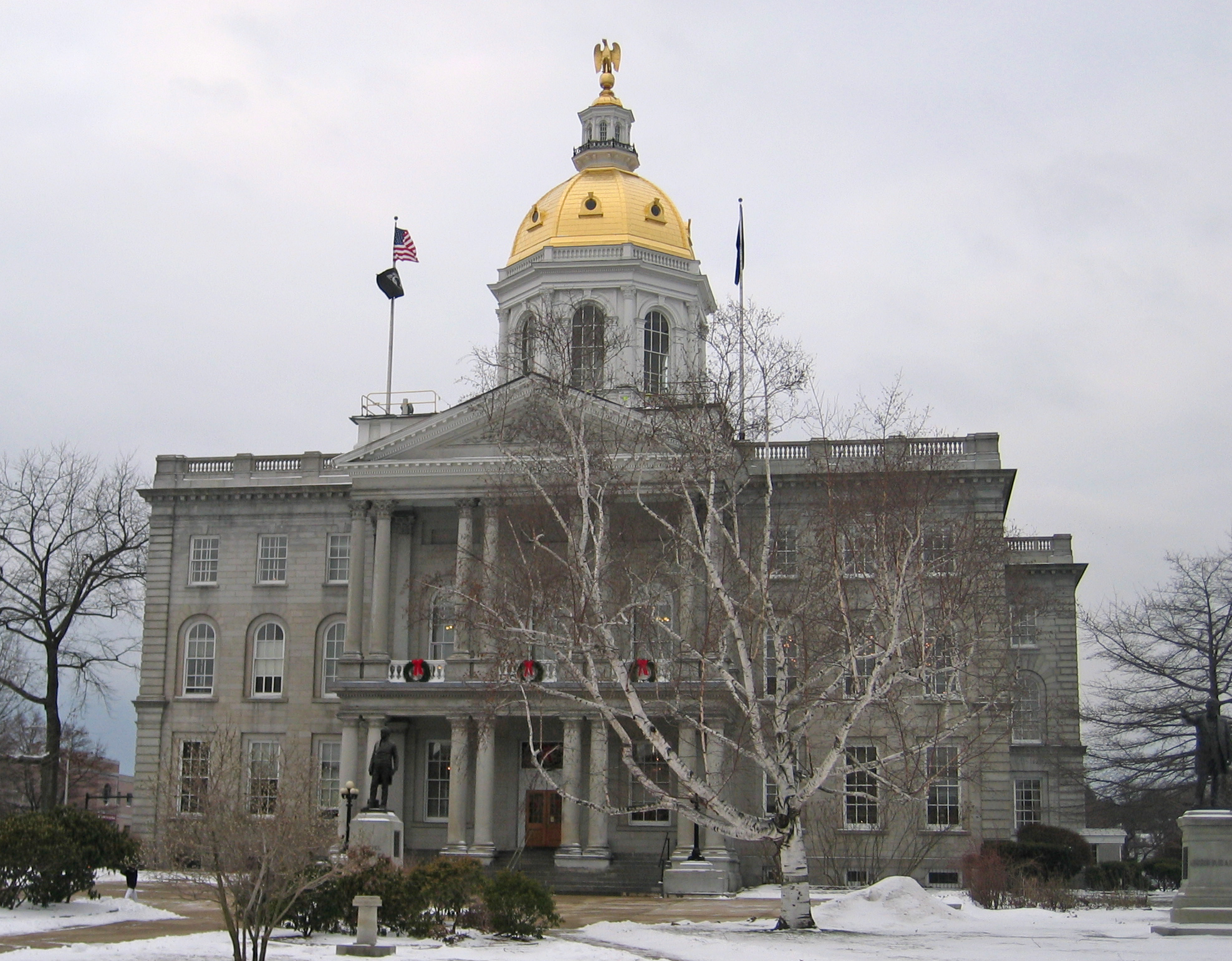
The New Hampshire State House in Concord

New Hampshire is governed by its constitution of 1783. The constitution is in two parts, a Bill of Rights and a longer Form of Government. Unlike the United States Constitution, amendments to the New Hampshire Constitution are not set out afterward but edit the text. It is one of the few state constitutions that acknowledge the right of revolution.

The state constitution is one of the few that do not expressly require public schools. However, in 1993, the state Supreme Court ruled in the first Claremont suit that a constitutional duty to "cherish the interest of...public schools" required the state to define and fund equal public schools statewide. The legislature complied slowly; in 2008, the Court ended its supervisory role because the original laws had been replaced, but it did not reverse its earlier finding.

The state constitution has many expressions concerning the character of the people and the criteria that should guide their election of officials. It also forbids the legislature from appropriating pensions for longer than the current year, although state employees now do have conventional employment contracts and a retirement system deemed "deferred compensation."

=== State law ===
The current codification of state law under the constitution is the New Hampshire Revised Statutes Annotated of 1955.

New Hampshire is the only state with no law requiring wearing of seat belts nor use of motorcycle helmets. (The law now does make these demands of those under 18.) A driver does not need to have vehicle insurance but must provide "proof of financial responsibility" to the state after an accident. Failure to do so can result in loss of driving privileges until the injured party is paid in full for their loss. Unlike the neighboring states, New Hampshire has no "bottle bill."

New Hampshire had no law against having an open container of alcohol in a car until 1990, though it has since cracked down on alcohol in numerous ways, including a 2008 enactment that makes underage possession of alcohol include possessing it inside one's body.

New Hampshire is a constitutional carry state, allowing open and concealed carry of all guns while not requiring any permits. New Hampshire also allows the protection of oneself or property with stand your ground laws expanding the castle doctrine.

Civil unions became legal in New Hampshire at the start of 2008, giving all the rights associated with marriage in the state to same-sex couples. On January 1, 2010, same-sex marriage became legal in New Hampshire, overriding the civil union law.

The state previously had the death penalty for specific categories of homicide. The most recent execution, of Howard Long, was conducted in 1939.

In 2008, a jury voted to impose the death penalty, for the first time since 1959, on Michael K. Addison for the murder of Michael Briggs, an on-duty police officer. In 2019, the death penalty was repealed; as the repeal was not retroactive, Addison remains on death row.

New Hampshire was the last state in the country to require public kindergarten, which was mandated in 2007.

=== Administrative rules ===
Rules that agencies issue, as authorized by statute, are collected in the New Hampshire Code of Administrative Rules.

== Branches of government ==
=== Legislative ===
The legislature is called the General Court. It consists of the House of Representatives (400 members) and the Senate (24 members).

The General Court is the fourth-largest legislature in the English-speaking world, behind only the British Parliament, the United States Congress, and the Parliament of Canada respectively; and the New Hampshire House of Representatives is also the fourth-largest individual chamber (exceeded in number by the United States House of Representatives, the British House of Commons and the British House of Lords). The House was originally 87 members, each one representing 100 "rateable polls". Despite this ratio being increased to 1 representative for 600 inhabitants, the House grew to 443 members. A 1942 constitutional amendment fixed its size at 375–400 members. As of 2023, there is one representative for every 3,505 residents. For the U.S. Congress to have the same representation, there would need to be 95,553 representatives.

The legislature apportions legislative seats based on the decennial U.S. Census. The problem of allocating 400 legislators to 259 municipalities and ensuring equal representation is solved with floterial districts. For example, a city due more than five representatives but not quite six might elect five representing the city itself, and one more in a floterial district that includes some neighboring towns.

State legislators are paid $200 for their two-year term, plus mileage, effectively making them volunteers. The only other remuneration is free use of toll roads and of state-owned resorts. A 2007 survey found that nearly half the members of the House are retired, with an average age over 60.

=== Executive ===
The executive branch consists of the Governor, Executive Council, and state agencies. The executive branch implements and enforces the laws of the state. The Governor is the supreme executive and is afforded the title of His or Her Excellency, though the Constitution only provides for "His Excellency".

The current Governor is Kelly Ayotte (R).

Unlike most other states, the Governor shares executive power with the Executive Council, which the Governor chairs. The Governor and Executive Council must concur on state contracts over $5,000, high-level agency appointments, and pardons. The Governor's veto power and command of the National Guard are not dependent on the Executive Council. The Governor and Councilors are elected to two-year terms. New Hampshire and Vermont are the only states that still elect governors to two-year, rather than four-year, terms. Agency appointments are generally for terms of four or five years, which means that a New Hampshire governor is unable to form a new cabinet when first taking office.

New Hampshire does not have a Lieutenant Governor as most states do. The Senate President serves as Acting Governor whenever the governor is out of the state or otherwise unable to perform the duties of the office. After the Senate President, the Speaker of the House, Secretary of State and State Treasurer are next in line to serve as Acting Governor.

=== Judicial ===
The state's highest and the sole appellate court is the New Hampshire Supreme Court. The Chief Justice is the head of the judiciary and, with the other justices of the Supreme Court, oversees the judicial branch. New Hampshire has three additional courts and one division:

- The Superior Court is the court of general jurisdiction and the only court that holds jury trials in civil and criminal cases.
- The state's Probate Court has jurisdiction over trusts, wills and estates, adoptions, termination of parental rights, name changes, guardianship of incapacitated persons, guardianship of minors, partition of property and involuntary admissions.
- The District Court hears cases involving families, juveniles, minor crimes and violations, and civil matters under $25,000.
- The Family Division has jurisdiction over divorce, child custody, child support, domestic violence, guardianship of minors, termination of parental rights, abuse/neglect, children in need of services (CHINS), juvenile delinquency, and some adoptions.

== Political parties ==
=== Registration ===
The Democratic Party and the Republican Party are the only official parties, for which the state lets a voter register, holds a primary election, and gives a column on the general-election ballot. Minor parties must poll 4% in a statewide or Congressional election to become official parties, and they lose that designation if they cease to poll 4%. The Libertarian Party had official party status from 1990 to 1994, and again from 2016 to 2018.

A voter registered in an official political party cannot vote in a different party's primary election. Voters registered as "independent" can vote in any party's primary, but are then automatically registered in that party. The voter can change registration at the polls after voting, or at a meeting of a town's Supervisors of the Checklist or at the City Clerk's office. These rules impede the casting of a cross-over vote for a different party. Registering in a party constrains a voter's choice of ballot, but demonstrates support for the chosen party, and is a prerequisite to being a candidate of that party.

=== Primary elections ===
The famous New Hampshire presidential primary occurs early in the four-year election cycle. State law requires its date to be set "7 days or more immediately preceding the date on which any other state shall hold a similar election", though the Iowa caucuses are not considered "a similar election".

Nominations for all other partisan offices are decided in a separate primary election held in September of election years. In Presidential election cycles, this is the second primary election held in New Hampshire.

== Local government ==
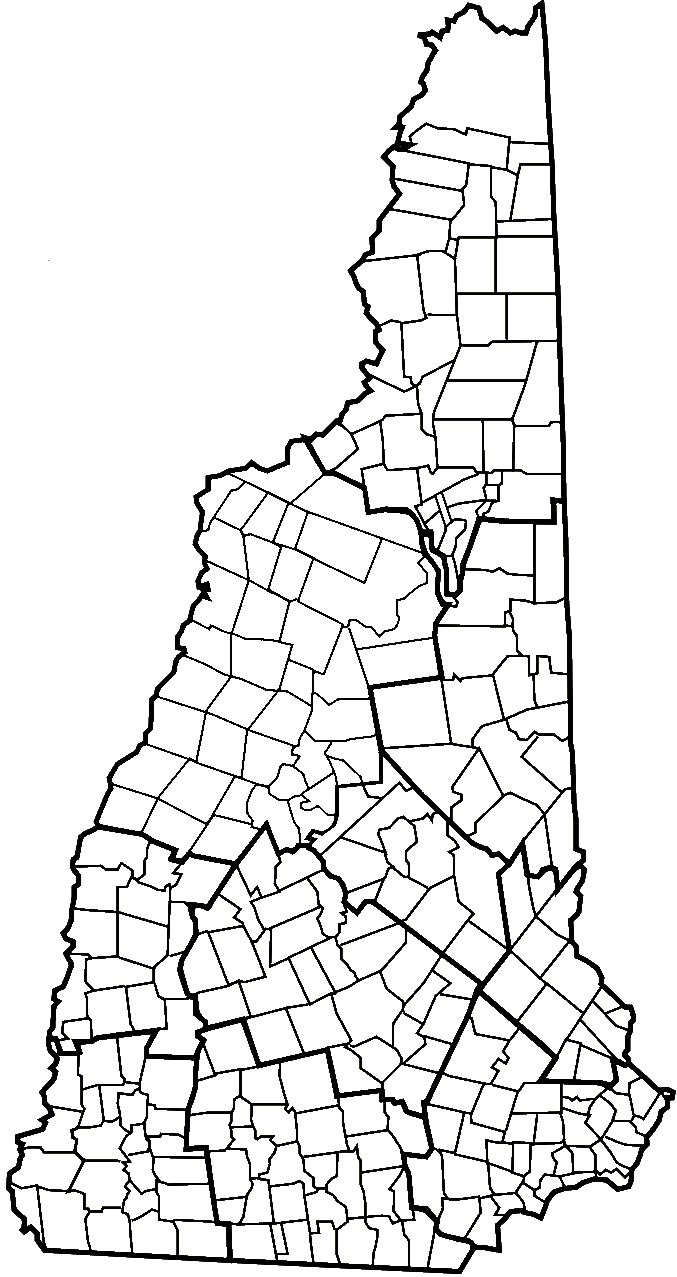
New Hampshire's 234 local governments and 25 unincorporated areas are organized into ten counties.

=== Municipalities ===
New Hampshire comprises 13 cities and 221 towns, plus 25 unincorporated places. These governments conform to Dillon's Rule; that is, they are creatures of the state whose powers are limited to those expressly granted to them by law. Municipalities also have powers necessarily implied by those express powers, and those essential to the local government's existence, but this authority is narrowly construed, in contrast to the practice in most of New England. For statistics on New Hampshire municipalities and comparisons to municipalities elsewhere in New England, see New England town.

Cities are governed by Boards of Aldermen (in Manchester and Nashua) or City Councils (in all other cities).

In towns, the executive power is the Board of Selectmen, except that some towns, especially larger ones, are governed by a Town Council. The Town Meeting is effectively the municipal legislature, of which every registered voter is a member. State law governs the timing of, and warrant for, Town Meetings. Town Meeting approves, amends, or rejects the items on the warrant, which must be published in advance. Articles can be placed on the warrant by the town's executive board or by citizen petition.

Town Meeting meets annually, normally on the second Tuesday in March, to set the year's budget. Special Town Meetings can be called to deal with urgent transactions. The municipal election, which selects town officers for the coming year and may approve changes to local law such as the zoning ordinance, is thought of as a session of the Town Meeting.

=== Government by referendum (SB 2) ===
Since 1995, a town may elect to govern itself by Official Ballot Referenda. This procedure is known as SB 2. In such towns, Town Meeting is a "deliberative" session that decides the wording of each warrant article; the binding decision is taken by secret ballot at the same time that the officers for the next year are elected. A three-fifths majority is required to adopt or to drop the SB 2 procedure.

=== School districts ===
School districts are separate from municipalities and, if governed by a Town Meeting, have a separate budget and agenda and an elected moderator, who may be different from the municipal moderator.

A school district can be governed by Official Ballot Referenda just as a town can.

Towns often combine into School Administrative Units (SAUs), at least for the management of high schools and sometimes for all the schools. If a town is a member of an SAU but operates its own elementary school, voters have a say in both organizations.

=== Counties ===
New Hampshire is divided into 10 counties. Counties have a sheriff's department for rural law enforcement and a jail, and may have a nursing home, an extension service for farmers, social services, and other services. In the smaller towns and unincorporated places, the county may provide services that are usually municipal, such as health inspection of restaurants.

The legislature of a county is the County Convention, a single chamber consisting of the "delegation" of all the state representatives elected from that county. The county's executive power is an elected Board of Commissioners.

From time to time, it is proposed that county government be abolished and its functions transferred to the state or to municipalities.

=== Funding ===
All of the above local governments are funded primarily by a property tax. The government budget, as voted by the county legislature, the Board of Aldermen or City Council, or the town or school-district town meeting, is divided into the assessed value of all property in the respective region, so that each property owner pays a share based on the property value. Some or all of the tax is waived for certain types of property (for example, through religious, educational, and charitable exemptions) and for certain classes of taxpayer (such as the poor, elderly, and veterans). Large parcels are assessed on their current use rather than their "best and highest use" if the owner cedes development rights. A property owner receives a tax bill that breaks out millage rates that apply to the following:

- The municipality.
- Any precinct subject to a higher tax to fund local projects.
- The school district(s).
- The county.
- A statewide property tax. New Hampshire instituted this tax in 2002, in response to court-ordered statewide equalization of education funding (see Claremont suits). The tax, which was lower than the amount previously assessed by school districts, is in theory returned to the school districts, though adjustments by the state legislature create "donor towns" and "recipient towns."

The appraisal of a property directly affects the property tax. The state requires town-wide reappraisal at least every five years, typically conducted by professional consultants, to ensure that the valuations follow changes in the real estate market and the general price of real estate. A property owner may challenge a reassessment.

== Taxation ==
Contrary to many other U.S. states, New Hampshire does not have a general income tax nor a general sales tax. In 2025, the state was ranked third-best on the Tax Competitiveness Index created by the Tax Foundation. It has the following taxes:

- Business Profits Tax
- Business Enterprise Tax - 0.75% - an income tax on sole proprietors
- Communications Services Tax
- Meals and Rentals Tax - 8.5% sales tax on meals, vehicle rentals, and hotel rooms
- Tobacco Tax
- Real Estate Transfer Tax
- Timber Tax
- Gravel Tax
- State Education Property Tax
- Utility Property Tax
- Local Property Tax
- Fuel Tax
