= Courts of New Hampshire =

Courts of New Hampshire include:

State courts of New Hampshire

- New Hampshire Supreme Court
  - New Hampshire Superior Court
  - New Hampshire District Court
  - New Hampshire Family Division
  - New Hampshire Probate Court

Federal courts located in New Hampshire

- United States District Court for the District of New Hampshire
