= David D. King =

David D. King may refer to:

- David King (footballer, born 1985), Australian rules footballer
- David D. King (jurist), New Hampshire judge

== See also ==
- David King (disambiguation)
