= Allegheny National Fish Hatchery =

Fish hatchery and park in Pennsylvania, United States

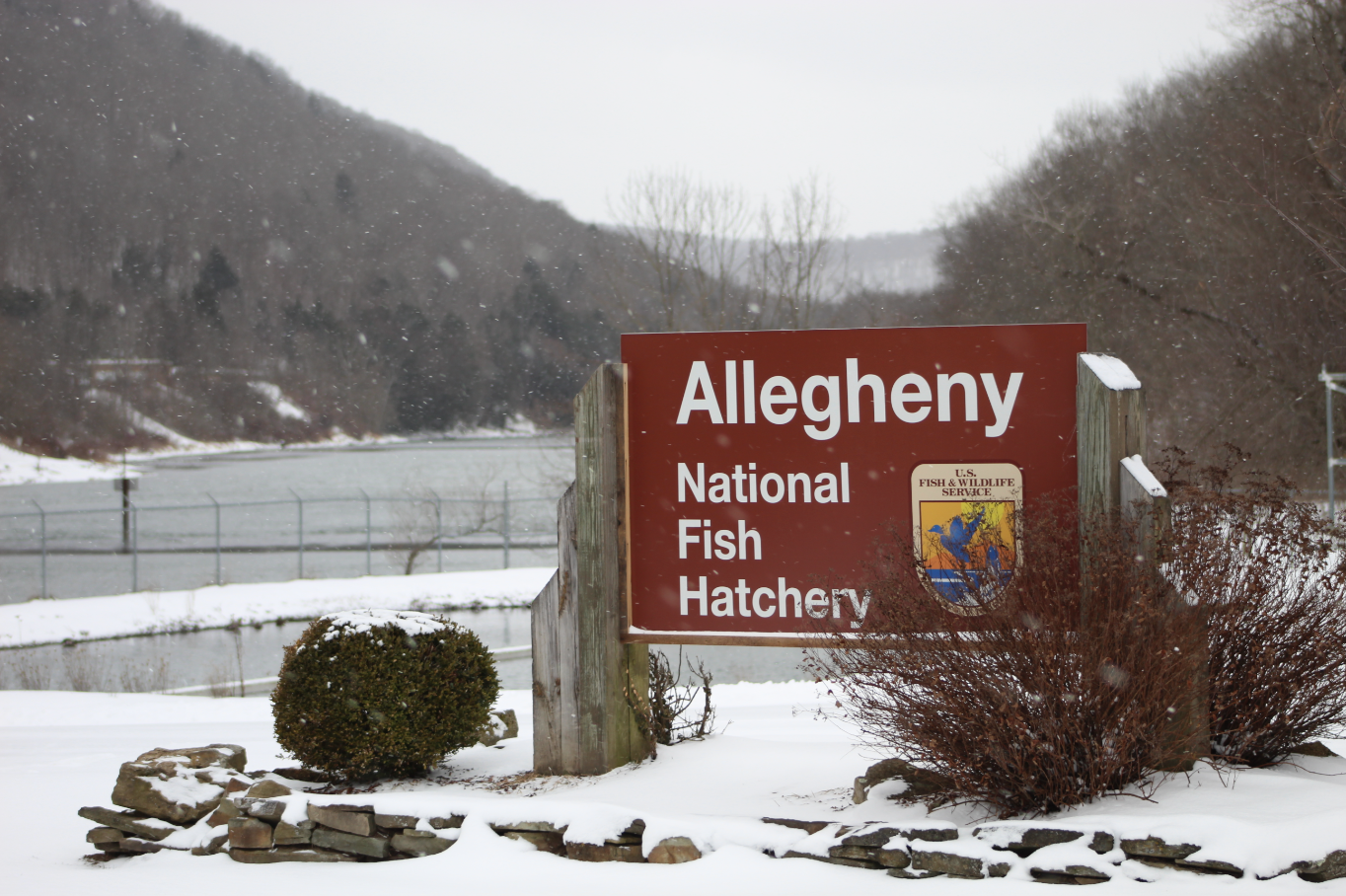

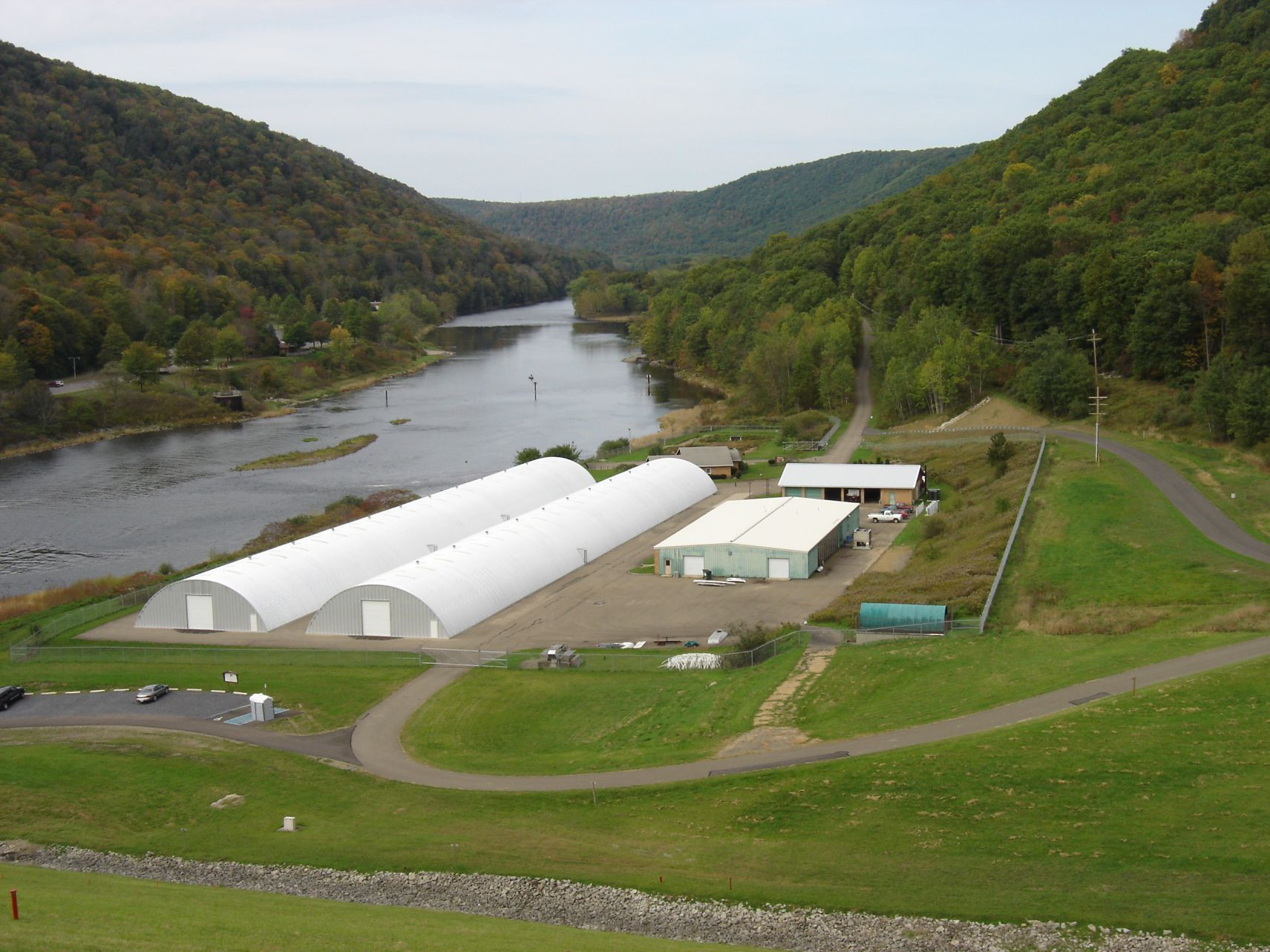
- TOP: The Allegheny National Fish Hatchery's entrance sign on a winter day. ABOVE: A downstream view from the Kinzua Dam of the Allegheny River (left) and the Allegheny National Fish Hatchery (center).

- Location within Pennsylvania Location within the United States
- Location: Warren, Pennsylvania, United States
- Coordinates: 41.8417°N 079.0061°W
- Area: 45 acres (18 ha)
- Established: 1975
- Governing body: United States Fish and Wildlife Service
- Website: www.fws.gov/fish-hatchery/allegheny

The Allegheny National Fish Hatchery is a fish hatchery administered by the United States Fish and Wildlife Service on the north bank of the Allegheny River. It lies on 45 acres (18 hectares) of land in Warren County, Pennsylvania, about 200 feet (61 m) downriver from the Kinzua Dam and is a component of the National Fish Hatchery System. Like other components of the National Fish Hatchery System, the hatchery's mission is to conserve, protect, and enhance fish, wildlife, plants, and their habitats, as well to cooperate with like-minded partners to further these goals. Specifically, the hatchery produces lake trout (Salvelinus namaycush) and bloaters (Coregonus hoyi) for the restoration of populations of those species in Lake Erie and Lake Ontario.

== History ==
The United States Congress authorized the Allegheny National Fish Hatchery in 1959. Between 1960 and 1965, the United States Army Corps of Engineers built the Kinzua Dam on the Allegheny River to control flooding. In 1966, the United States Fish and Wildlife Service (USFWS) entered into a 50-year use agreement for a site for the hatchery on U.S. Army Corps of Engineers-owned land just below the dam. Construction of the hatchery finally began in 1973. After the completion of the first phase of its construction, the hatchery began to produce fish in 1975. It reached its full production capacity upon completion of the second phase of construction in 1978.

Initially, the hatchery produced brook trout (Salvelinus fontinalis), brown trout (Salmo trutta), rainbow trout (Oncorhynchus mykiss), and landlocked Atlantic salmon (Salmo salar) for the stocking of Lake Erie, Lake Michigan, Lake Ontario, and waterways in Pennsylvania and New York. It produced as many as 1.3 million fish annually until 2005, when lake trout and brook trout at the hatchery tested positive for infectious pancreatic necrosis, a highly contagious disease capable of killing up to 90 percent of young fish it infects. To prevent the disease from spreading, all fish at the hatchery were destroyed. During a thorough decontamination of the facility that followed, the staff discovered serious infrastructure problems that prevented the hatchery from resuming its operations.

In 2009, funding for repairs became available through the American Recovery and Reinvestment Act, and in March 2010 the U.S. Fish and Wildlife Service let a contract for repairs that included a new degasification system and a new oxygen generation system — necessary because the water supplied by the hatchery's four wells is supersaturated with nitrogen and must go through an aeration and degassing process to make it non-toxic for fish, then be injected with oxygen to enhance water quality. The repairs also included the installation of a new well-water treatment system and the construction of a new structure to house equipment associated with the new systems.

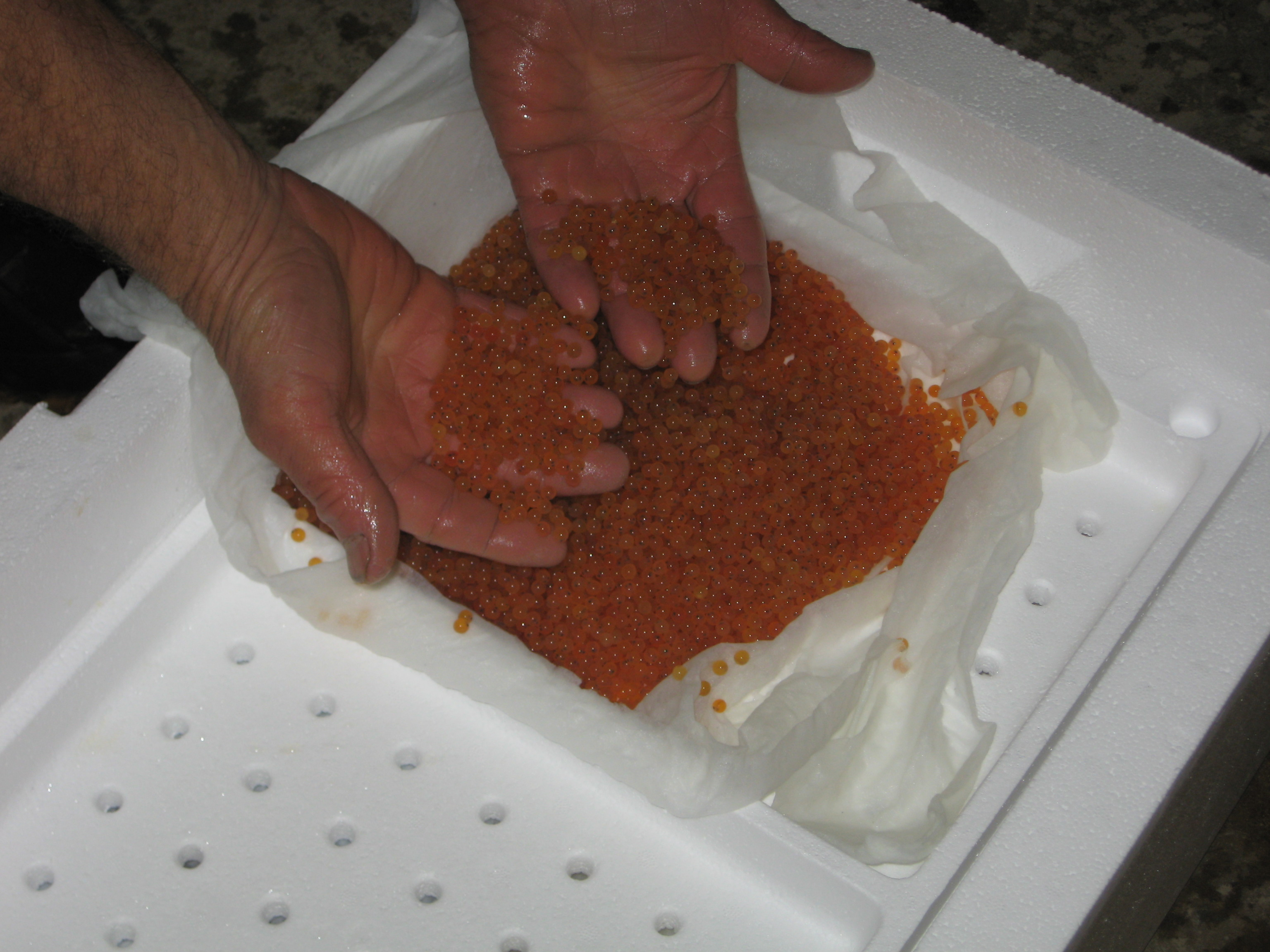
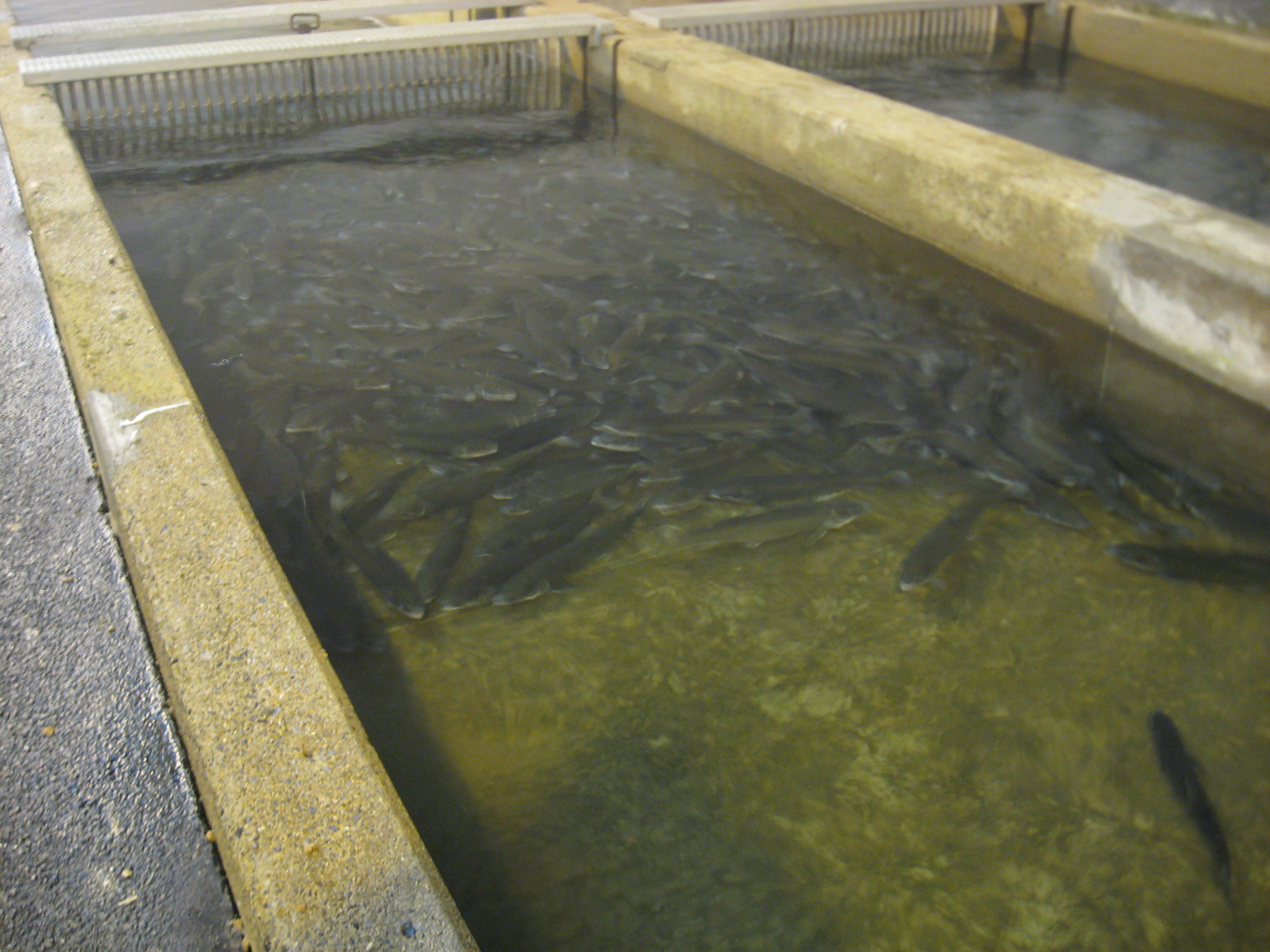
The hatchery resumes operations in late 2011. LEFT: On December 6, 2011, an employee handles lake trout (Salvelinus namaycush) eggs received from other hatcheries. RIGHT: Lake trout received from the Berkshire National Fish Hatchery swim in a raceway at the Allegheny facility on December 29, 2011.

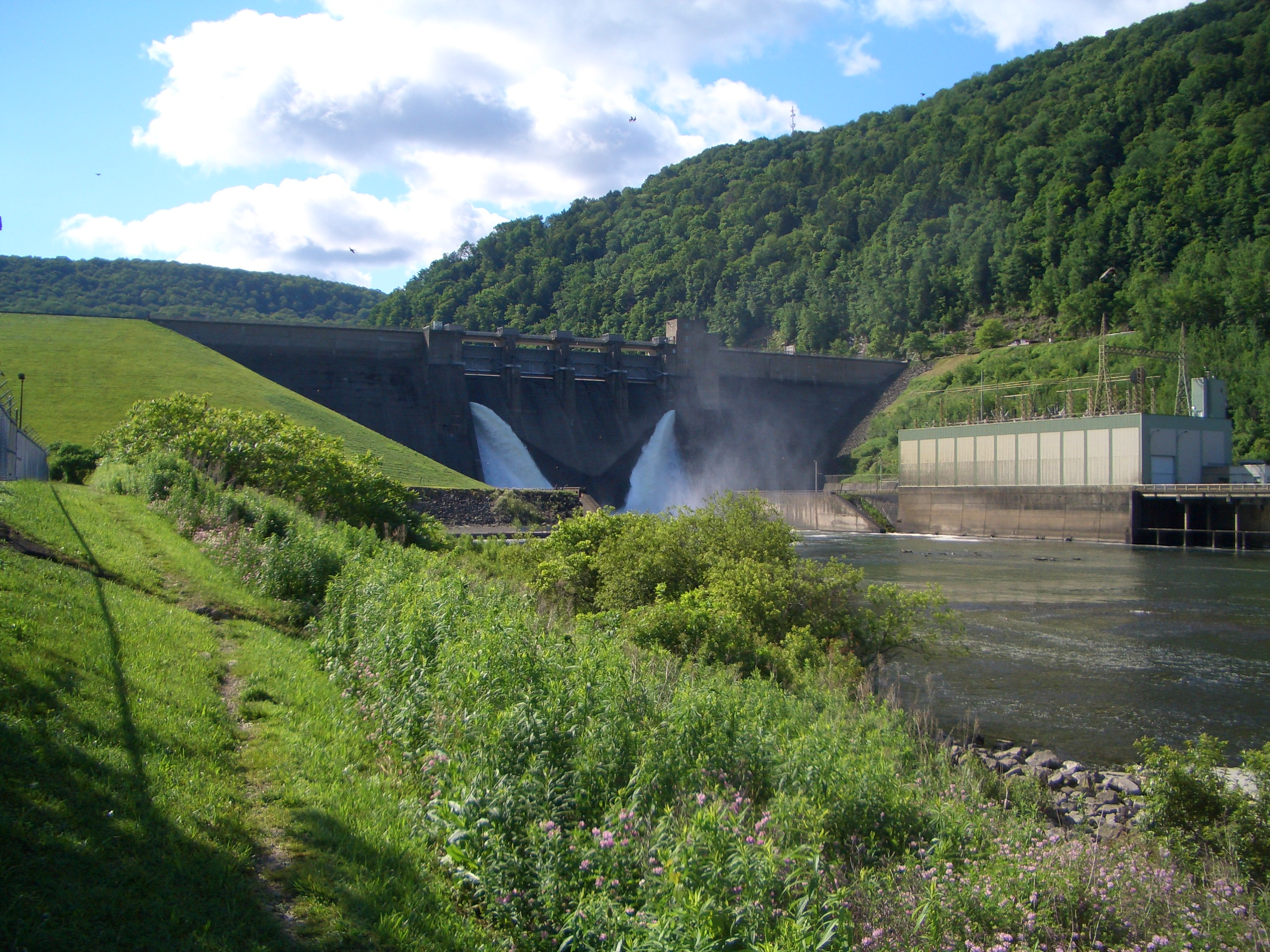
The Kinzua Dam as seen from the Allegheny National Fish Hatchery.

With the repairs complete, the hatchery finally resumed fish production in November 2011, when 2,200 juvenile lake trout from the Berkshire National Fish Hatchery in western Massachusetts were released into the Allegheny National Fish Hatchery's raceways to serve as its new broodstock. In December 2011, the hatchery received a total of one million lake trout eggs from the State of Vermont's Salisbury Fish Hatchery, the Sullivan Creek National Fish Hatchery in Michigan, and the Iron River National Fish Hatchery in Wisconsin. The hatchery's focus became the production of lake trout to support the Great Lakes Restoration Initiative in Lake Erie and Lake Ontario, and as of 2012 it was the only hatchery dedicated to restoring lake trout to the lakes. The first fish the hatchery produced after it resumed operations were stocked into the lakes in May 2013. In 2016 the USFWS renewed its land-use agreement for the hatchery with the U.S. Army Corps of Engineers for another 50 years.

== Management ==
The USFWS manages and operates the Allegheny National Fish Hatchery.

== Activities ==
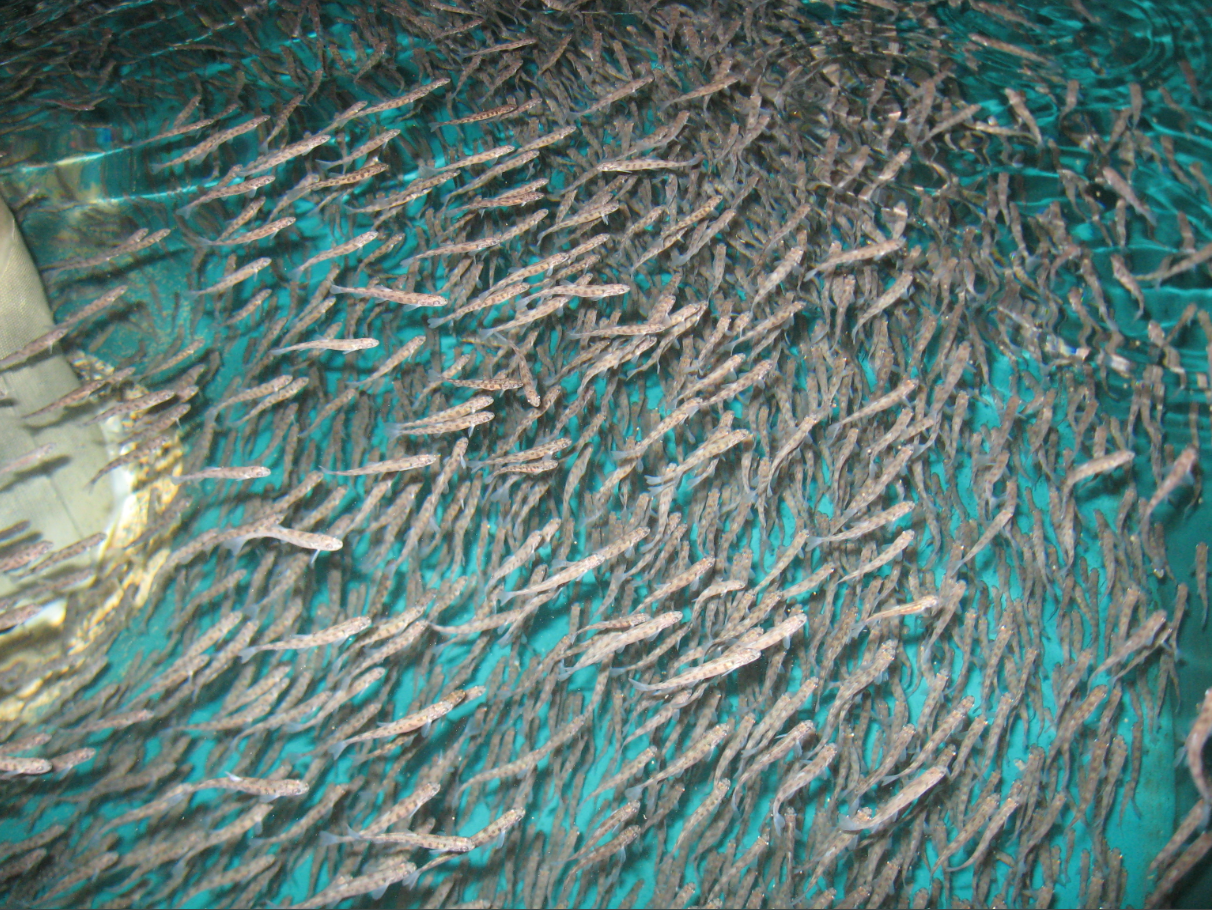
Lake trout (Salvelinus namaycush) fry swimming at the hatchery prior to their spring 2015 release into the Great Lakes.

As of 2025, the Allegheny National Fish Hatchery focuses on the production of lake trout (Salvelinus namaycush) and bloaters (Coregonus hoyi) for the restoration of populations of lake trout in Lake Erie and Lake Ontario and of bloaters in Lake Ontario. Its work supports the Great Lakes Restoration Initiative, a partnership of 16 United States Government, U.S. state, and Canadian provincial agencies working together to address the most significant environmental problems in the Great Lakes.

Fish hatched at the hatchery spend about 18 months there before they are released into the wild. Fish production takes place on a cycle that sees the hatchery staff take eggs from gravid female fish and spawn them in October and November. The eggs hatch and the young fry begin to grow between December and March. In August and September, the hatchery uses automated machinery to tag and fin-clip the fish for lake survival and growth studies. By the following April and May the fish have become "yearlings" — about 18 months old and 6 to 8 inches (15 to 20 cm) long — and the staff loads them into trucks which transport them to the shores of Lake Erie and Lake Ontario in Pennsylvania, New York, and Ohio, where they are released into the lakes.

The hatchery works with local partners to stage outreach events that educate the public about hatchery operations, fisheries science, and conservation.

== Recreation ==
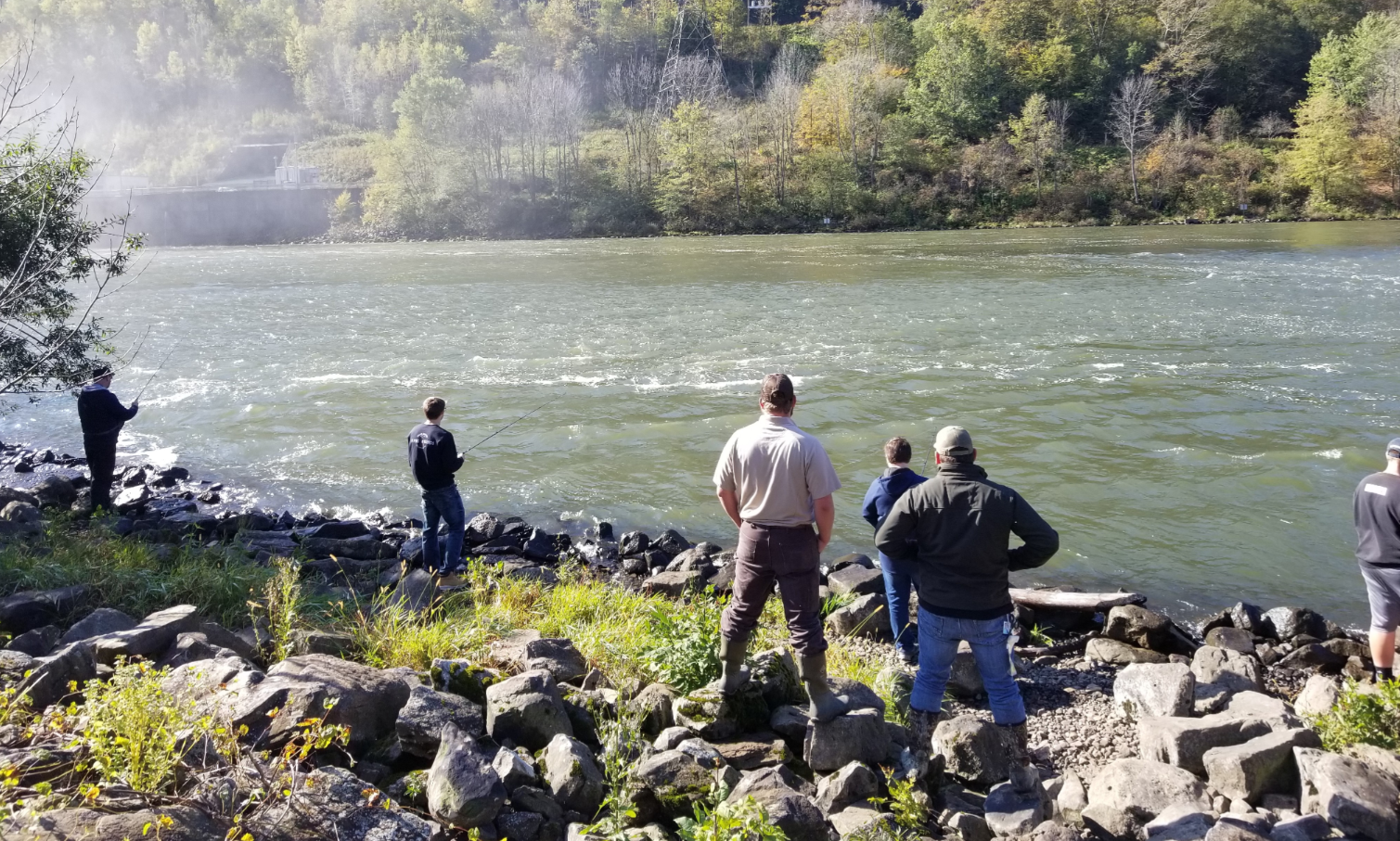
Recreational fishing in the Allegheny River at the hatchery.

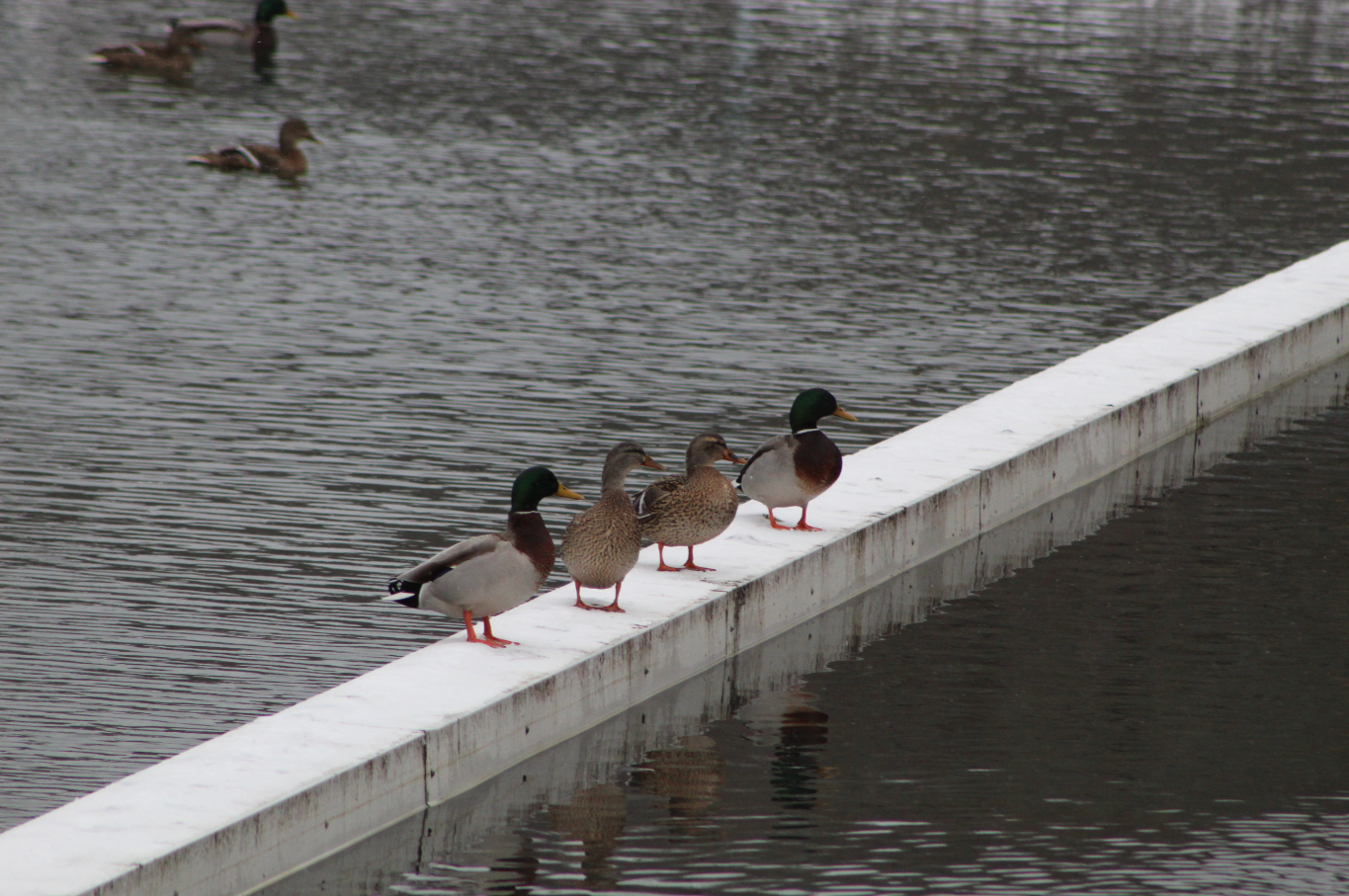
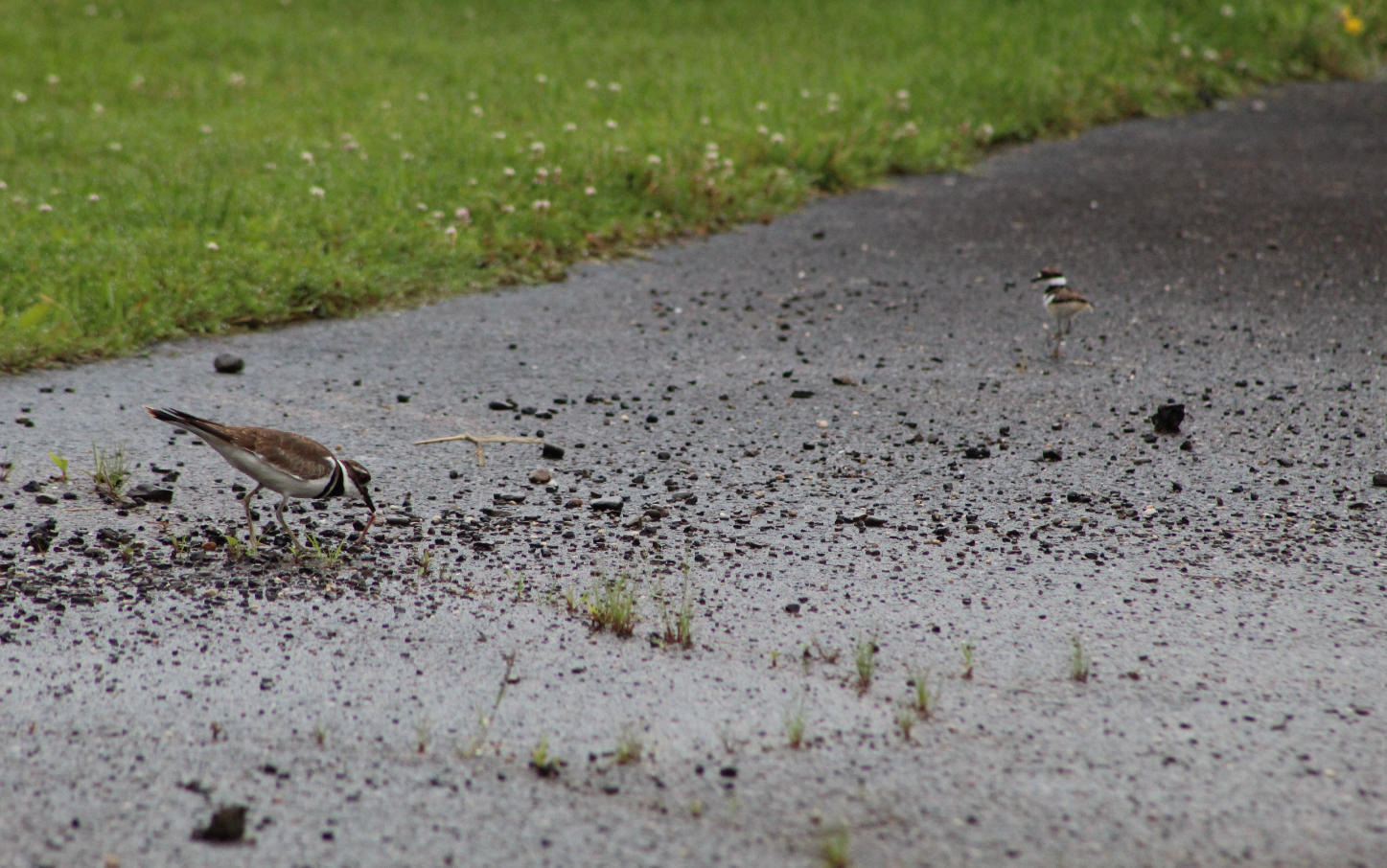
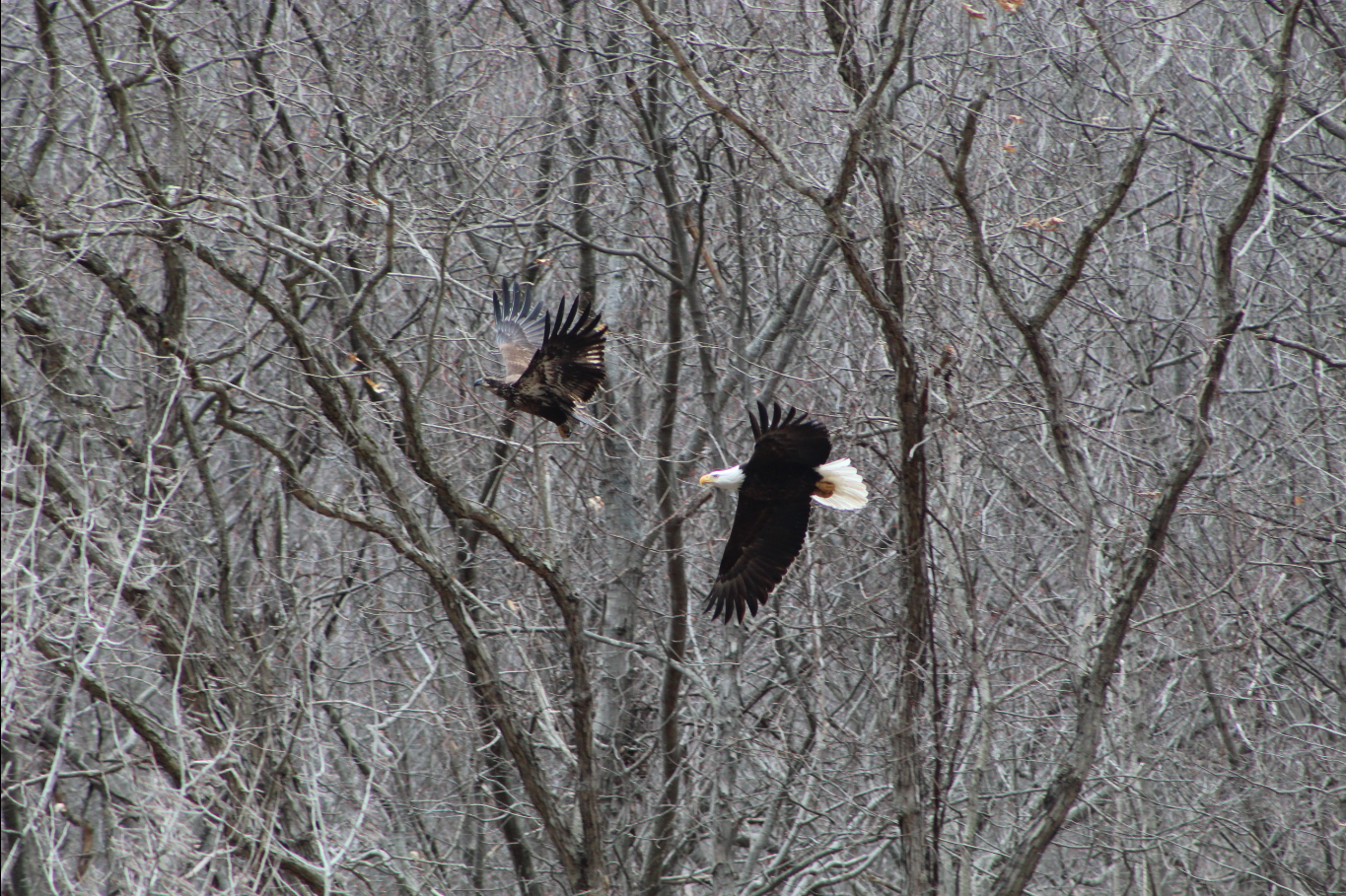
Birds at the hatchery. LEFT: Mallards (Anas platyrhynchos). MIDDLE: A killdeer (Charadrius vociferus). RIGHT: Bald eagles (Haliaeetus leucocephalus).

The Allegheny National Fish Hatchery offers tours in which visitors can observe and learn about its operations. Throughout the year, the public can see the hatchery staff feed young fish and carry out other tasks related to raising them. On various days during April and May visitors can see the hatchery staff loading trucks with yearling fish for transport to Lake Erie and Lake Ontario. In August and September, the public can observe the hatchery's use of automated machinery to tag and clip the fins of fish. During October and November, visitors can look on as the staff takes eggs, normally on Tuesdays, and spawns them. From December through March, the public can visit as the hatchery incubates eggs and begins to raise young fry.

The waters of the Allegheny River below the Kinzua Dam in the vicinity of the hatchery provide good recreational fishing opportunities for trout, walleye (Sander vitreus), bass (Percomorpha), and muskellunge (Esox masquinongy). Fishing is not permitted at the hatchery itself, but upon request the hatchery will provide shore access to anglers. In addition, the U.S. Army Corps of Engineers constructed and maintains a fishing platform and public toilet facilities adjacent to and just upstream from the hatchery. Located on Pennsylvania Route 59, the platform is open 24 hours a day except when the Allegheny River's flow rate exceeds 6,000 cu ft/s (170 m^{3}/s) or when winter weather conditions prompt road closures.

The hatchery's environs also offer opportunities for birdwatching. Bald eagles (Haliaeetus leucocephalus), killdeer (Charadrius vociferus), osprey (Pandion haliaetus), mallards (Anas platyrhynchos), and swallows are common in the area.
