= David King =

David or Dave King may refer to:

== Entertainment ==
- Dave King (actor) (1929–2002), English comedian, actor and vocalist
- Dave King (Irish singer) (born 1961), Irish vocalist and member of Flogging Molly
- David King (drummer) (born 1970), American drummer for Happy Apple and the Bad Plus
- David King (theatre producer) (born 1956), British theatre producer

== Politics ==
- David King (chemist) (born 1939), British chemist and former chief scientific adviser to the UK government
- David C. King (fl. 1985), American author, political scientist, and Harvard University professor
- David D. King (jurist) (born 1959), New Hampshire administrative judge
- David Orr King (1938–2019), American politician, Representative for Pennsylvania
- David S. King (1917–2009), American politician, Representative for Utah
- David Thomas King (born 1946), Canadian politician and Minister of Education in Alberta
- David W. King (born 1946), American politician from New Mexico

== Sports ==
- Dave King (businessman) (born 1955), Scottish businessman, Rangers F.C. director
- Dave King (footballer, born 1940) (1940–2010), English professional association footballer
- Dave King (footballer, born 1962), English professional association footballer
- Dave King (ice hockey) (born 1947), Canadian professional ice hockey coach
- David King (cricketer) (born 1990), Australian cricketer
- David King (defensive back) (born 1963), American gridiron footballer for the San Diego Chargers and Green Bay Packers
- David King (defensive end) (born 1989), American gridiron footballer for the Philadelphia Eagles
- David King (figure skater) (born 1984), British figure skater
- David King (footballer, born 1972), Australian rules footballer for North Melbourne, media personality, and sports journalist
- David King (footballer, born 1985), Australian rules footballer for Collingwood
- David King (footballer, born 1990), English footballer
- David King (hurdler) (born 1994), English hurdler
- David King (hurler) (born 1993), Irish hurler
- David King (punter) (born 1981), American football player from Australia

== Writers ==
- Dave King (novelist) (born 1955), American novelist and poet
- David King (graphic designer) (1943–2016), British graphic designer, historian, book author, and Soviet art collector
- David King (historian) (born 1970), American writer and historian
- David A. King (historian), British orientalist, author, professor, and astronomy historian
- David Wooster King (1893–1975), American army officer, legionnaire, and author

== Others ==
- David King (artist) (1948–2019), British graphic designer and artist
- David A. King (engineer) (born 1961/1962), director of the NASA Marshall Space Flight Center
- David H. King, Jr. (1849–1916), New York builder
- David Ward King (1857–1920), farmer and inventor of the King road drag

== Fictional characters ==
- David King (Dead by Daylight), in the 2016 survival horror action multiplayer video game
- David King, portrayed by Denzel Washington in 2025 film Highest 2 Lowest
- David King, from Charlie Higson's 2009 horror novel the Enemy
- David King, portrayed by Morris Chestnut in 2015 film The Perfect Guy
- David King, in the 2003 survival horror video game Resident Evil Outbreak

== See also ==
- King David (disambiguation)
- King (surname)
