= Ellen Christo =

American judge (born 1965)

Hon. Ellen V. Christo

New Hampshire Circuit Court Administrative Judge
- Incumbent
- Assumed office July 1, 2024
- Appointed by: Gordon J. MacDonald
- Preceded by: Hon. David D. King

New Hampshire Circuit Court Judge
- In office October 2021 – June 30, 2024

Personal details
- Born: 1965 (age 60–61)
- Spouse: Thomas K. Christo

Ellen V. Christo is the current Administrative Judge of the New Hampshire Circuit Court effective July 1, 2024.

== Early life and education ==
Ellen V. Christo received her Juris Doctor in Law from the UNH Franklin Pierce School of Law. She completed her undergraduate studies at the University of New Hampshire, earning a Bachelor of Arts in Political Science. During her time at UNH, she served as a Student Ambassador.

== Legal career ==
Ellen Christo began her career as a Corporate Litigation Attorney at Hare & Chaffin in Boston, Massachusetts, where she worked from January 1994 to February 2008.

Following this, she managed her own practice, Christo Law Offices / Global Legal Solutions Group, in Hampton Falls, New Hampshire, for a decade. From November 2013 to January 2015, she worked as a Corporate Attorney for both public and private companies at Shaheen & Gordon, P.A., in Dover, New Hampshire. In February 2015, Ellen Christo joined UNHInnovation at the University of New Hampshire as the Senior Director of Strategic Partnerships, where she served until November 2018. She then headed the Legal and Government Affairs department at Galvion (formerly Revision Military) from October 2018 to May 2020, overseeing operations in Montreal, Canada, and Portsmouth, New Hampshire. Subsequently, she served as the General Counsel and Head of Government Affairs at Textiles Coated International (TCI) in Londonderry, New Hampshire, from September 2020 to October 2021.

Since October 2021, Ellen Christo has been serving as a Judge in the New Hampshire Circuit Court.

== Diplomatic service ==
Judge Ellen Christo's experience includes working for two Governors and a United States Senator. She has honed her diplomatic skills through international assignments in Dubai, Jordan, Germany, Russia, Albania, and Hong Kong, where she interfaced with government officials, embassies, and international suppliers. Judge Christo has been active in the International Association of Women Judges, playing a central role in resettling women judges from Afghanistan who faced death threats after the Taliban regained control in 2021. Additionally, she collaborated with the Albanian government, drafting new laws and assisting with the World Bank as the country transitioned from communism to a democracy.

== Community service ==
From May 2020 to October 2021, Ellen Christo volunteered as Legal Counsel and International Government Affairs Liaison for the Army of Masks, a global grassroots initiative that provided DIY masks during the pandemic.

== Personal life ==
Ellen V. Christo was married to Thomas K. Christo before his death in 2008.
