= Prince David =

Prince David may refer to:

- HMCS Prince David (F89), a ship of the Royal Canadian Navy
- Prince David Bagration of Mukhrani (born 1976), claimed head of the Georgian (Bagrationi) royal dynasty
- Prince David Chavchavadze (born 1924), American author, born a Georgian nobleman
- Prince David Kawānanakoa (1868–1908), Prince of Hawaiʻi, patriarch of the House of Kawānanakoa, father of the below
- Prince David Kalākaua Kawānanakoa (1904–1953), Prince of Hawaiʻi, patriarch of the House of Kawānanakoa, son of the above
- Prince David of Georgia (1767–1819), head of the Georgian (Bagrationi) royal dynasty, regent of Georgia (Kartli-Kakheti)
- Prince David, also known as Prince Charming and David Nolan, a character from the ABC television series Once Upon a Time

== See also ==
- King David I of Scotland (1084–1153), known as David, Prince of the Cumbrians, prior to ascending the throne
- King David (disambiguation)
- King Edward VIII of the United Kingdom (later the Duke of Windsor; 1894–1972), known to his family and close friends as David, his last given name
