= Probate court =

Court dealing with probate and estates

A probate court (sometimes called a surrogate court, orphans' court, or court of ordinary) is a court that has competence in a jurisdiction to deal with matters of probate and the administration of estates. In some jurisdictions probate court functions are performed by a chancery court or another court of equity, or as a part or division of another court.

Probate courts administer proper distribution of the assets of a decedent (one who has died), adjudicates the validity of wills, enforces the provisions of a valid will (by issuing the grant of probate), prevents malfeasance by executors and administrators of estates, and provides for the equitable distribution of the assets of persons who die intestate (without a valid will), such as by granting a grant of administration giving judicial approval to the personal representative to administer matters of the estate.

In contested matters, the probate court examines the authenticity of a will and decides who is to receive the deceased person's property. In a case of an intestacy, the court determines who is to receive the deceased's property under the law of its jurisdiction. The probate court will then oversee the process of distributing the deceased's assets to the proper beneficiaries. A probate court can be petitioned by interested parties in an estate, such as when a beneficiary feels that an estate is being mishandled. The court has the authority to compel an executor to give an account of their actions.

In some jurisdictions (e.g. Texas) probate courts also handle other matters, such as guardianships, trusts, and mental health issues (including the authority to order involuntary commitment to psychiatric facilities and involuntary administering psychiatric medication). In Texas, there are 18 statutory probate courts created by legislative statute, called "Probate Courts" which have original and exclusive jurisdiction over its counties probate matters including guardianship cases and mental health commitments. In counties without these probate courts matters are handled by county or district courts.

== Orphans' Court ==
At least in Maryland and Pennsylvania, probate courts are still called orphans' courts, a name that in Maryland dates back to 1777 and reflects "the fact that the children of deceased male landowners were considered orphans when the father died." The purpose of these courts was to protect against abuses by stepparents and others. Today they hear matters involving contested wills of deceased estates and supervising estates that are probated judicially.

== Register of Probate ==
A Register of Probate is an elected position in some jurisdictions in the United States, such as New Hampshire, Massachusetts, and Maine (part of Massachusetts before 1820). Register of Wills is an elected position in jurisdictions such as Maryland.

The Registrar and staff administer the local Probate Court, typically for a given county, acting partly as public customer service and partly as clerks for the probate judge (who may or may not be elected).

== List of probate courts ==
The following is a partial list of probate courts:

=== England and Wales ===
- Prerogative court—former
- Court of Probate—former
- High Court of Justice Family Division—current

=== State courts of the United States ===
- California Superior Court
- Connecticut—Connecticut Probate Courts (a system of 54 probate court districts)
- Delaware—Office of Register of Wills
- District of Columbia—Superior Court of the District of Columbia, Probate Division
- Florida Florida Circuit Court, County Comptroller's Office
- Georgia—Probate Court formerly known as the Court of Ordinary (judge formally known as ordinary)
- Illinois — Probate Division (or Probate Court) of the Illinois circuit courts in each county
- Maryland—County Orphans' Courts, Office of Register of Wills
- Massachusetts—Probate and Family Court, Register of Probate
- Michigan—County Probate Courts
- Missouri—conducted by Circuit Courts, some of which have separate probate divisions, Office of Public Administrator
- New Hampshire—New Hampshire Probate Court
- New Jersey—New Jersey Superior Court, Chancery Division, Probate Part, Surrogate's Court (judges known as surrogates), Surrogate's Office
- New York—New York Surrogate's Court (judges known as surrogates)
- Ohio—conducted by Courts of Common Pleas, Family and Probate Divisions, Probate Court
- Pennsylvania—Orphans' Court Division of the Court of Common Pleas, Office of Register of Wills
- Texas—see Judiciary of Texas; the county court handles probate matters in most instances, but its jurisdiction may overlap with the district court. Also, in ten specific counties the Texas Legislature has established one or more Probate Courts to handle probate matters, removing them from county or district court jurisdiction.
- Vermont—Probate Courts, one in each of Vermont's 14 counties
- Virginia—Virginia Circuit Court

=== Canada ===
- New Brunswick—Probate Court of New Brunswick
- Nova Scotia—Probate Court of Nova Scotia
- All other provinces are constitutionally required to process probate through their superior courts as per section 96 of the Constitution Act, 1867.
- Ontario—Ontario Surrogate's Court
