= David II =

David II may refer to:

- Davit II, Caucasian Albanian Catholicos in 765–769
- David II Magistros of Tao-Klarjeti (died 937)
- David II of Klarjeti (died 993)
- David II of Lori (fl. 1111–1118)
- David IV of Georgia, the Builder, king in 1089–1125; sometimes referred to as David II
- David II Strathbogie, Earl of Atholl (died in 1326)
- David II of Scotland, King of Scotland from 1329 to 1371
- David II, Catholicos-Patriarch of Georgia, ruled in 1426–1428
- David II of Trebizond, Emperor of Trebizond from 1460 to 1461
- Dawit II of Ethiopia (1501–1540)
- David II of Kakheti (1678–1722)
- David II of Imereti (1756–1795)
- David II of Armenia (r. 806–833)

== See also ==
- Davit II (disambiguation)
- King David (disambiguation)
