= List of New Hampshire state courts by town =

City, Town or Unincorporated Place	Superior Court	Probate Court	District Court	Family Division
Acworth	Sullivan Superior	Sullivan Probate	Claremont District	Claremont Family Division
Albany	Carroll Superior	Carroll Probate	No. Carroll District	Conway Family Division
Alexandria	Grafton Superior	Grafton Probate	Plymouth District	Plymouth Family Division
Allenstown	Merrimack Superior	Merrimack Probate	Hooksett District	N/A
Alstead	Cheshire Superior	Cheshire Probate	Keene District	N/A
Alton	Belknap Superior	Belknap Probate	Laconia District	Laconia Family Division
Amherst	Hillsborough North Superior	Hillsborough Probate	Milford District	N/A
Andover	Merrimack Superior	Merrimack Probate	Franklin District	N/A
Antrim	Hillsborough North Superior	Hillsborough Probate	Hillsborough District	N/A
Ashland	Grafton Superior	Grafton Probate	Plymouth District	Plymouth Family Division
Atkinson & Gilmanton Academy Grant	Coos Superior	Coos Probate	Colebrook District	Colebrook Family Division
Atkinson	Rockingham Superior	Rockingham Probate	Plaistow District	Brentwood Family Division
Auburn	Rockingham Superior	Rockingham Probate	Auburn District	Derry Family Division
Barnstead	Belknap Superior	Belknap Probate	Laconia District	Laconia Family Division
Barrington	Strafford Superior	Strafford Probate	Rochester District	N/A
Bartlett	Carroll Superior	Carroll Probate	No. Carroll District	Conway Family Division
Bath	Grafton Superior	Grafton Probate	Haverhill District	No. Haverhill Family Division
Bean's Grant	Coos Superior	Coos Probate	Lancaster District	Lancaster Family Division
Bean's Purchase	Coos Superior	Coos Probate	Gorham District	N/A
Bedford	Hillsborough North Superior	Hillsborough Probate	Merrimack District	N/A
Belmont	Belknap Superior	Belknap Probate	Laconia District	N/A
Bennington	Hillsborough North Superior	Hillsborough Probate	Hillsborough District	N/A
Benton	Grafton Superior	Grafton Probate	Haverhill District	No. Haverhill Family Division
Berlin	Coos Superior	Coos Probate	Berlin District	Berlin Family Division
Bethlehem	Grafton Superior	Grafton Probate	Littleton District	Littleton Family Division
Boscawen	Merrimack Superior	Merrimack Probate	Franklin District	N/A
Bow	Merrimack Superior	Merrimack Probate	Concord District	N/A
Bradford	Merrimack Superior	Merrimack Probate	Henniker District	N/A
Brentwood	Rockingham Superior	Rockingham Probate	Exeter District	Brentwood Family Division
Bridgewater	Grafton Superior	Grafton Probate	Plymouth District	Plymouth Family Division
Bristol	Grafton Superior	Grafton Probate	Plymouth District	Plymouth Family Division
Brookfield	Carroll Superior	Carroll Probate	So. Carroll District	Ossipee Family Division
Brookline	Hillsborough South Superior	Hillsborough Probate	Milford District	N/A
Cambridge	Coos Superior	Coos Probate	Berlin District	Berlin Family Division
Campton	Grafton Superior	Grafton Probate	Plymouth District	Plymouth Family Division
Canaan	Grafton Superior	Grafton Probate	Lebanon District	Lebanon Family Division
Candia	Rockingham Superior	Rockingham Probate	Auburn District	Derry Family Division
Canterbury	Merrimack Superior	Merrimack Probate	Concord District	N/A
Carroll	Coos Superior	Coos Probate	Lancaster District	Lancaster Family Division
Center Harbor	Belknap Superior	Belknap Probate	Laconia District	Laconia Family Division
Chandler's Purchase	Coos Superior	Coos Probate	Lancaster District	Lancaster Family Division
Charlestown	Sullivan Superior	Sullivan Probate	Claremont District	Claremont Family Division
Chatham	Carroll Superior	Carroll Probate	No. Carroll District	Conway Family Division
Chester	Rockingham Superior	Rockingham Probate	Derry District	Derry Family Division
Chesterfield	Cheshire Superior	Cheshire Probate	Keene District	N/A
Chichester	Merrimack Superior	Merrimack Probate	Concord District	N/A
Claremont	Sullivan Superior	Sullivan Probate	Claremont District	Claremont Family Division
Clarksville	Coos Superior	Coos Probate	Colebrook District	Colebrook Family Division
Colebrook	Coos Superior	Coos Probate	Colebrook District	Colebrook Family Division
Columbia	Coos Superior	Coos Probate	Colebrook District	Colebrook Family Division
Concord	Merrimack Superior	Merrimack Probate	Concord District	N/A
Conway	Carroll Superior	Carroll Probate	No. Carroll District	Conway Family Division
Cornish	Sullivan Superior	Sullivan Probate	Claremont District	Claremont Family Division
Crawford's Purchase	Coos Superior	Coos Probate	Lancaster District	Lancaster Family Division
Croydon	Sullivan Superior	Sullivan Probate	Newport District	Newport Family Division
Cutt's Grant	Coos Superior	Coos Probate	No. Carroll District	Conway Family Division
Dalton	Coos Superior	Coos Probate	Lancaster District	Lancaster Family Division
Danbury	Merrimack Superior	Merrimack Probate	Franklin District	N/A
Danville	Rockingham Superior	Rockingham Probate	Plaistow District	Brentwood Family Division
Deerfield	Rockingham Superior	Rockingham Probate	Auburn District	Brentwood Family Division
Deering	Hillsborough North Superior	Hillsborough Probate	Hillsborough District	N/A
Derry	Rockingham Superior	Rockingham Probate	Derry District	Derry Family Division
Dix's Grant	Coos Superior	Coos Probate	Colebrook District	Colebrook Family Division
Dixville	Coos Superior	Coos Probate	Colebrook District	Colebrook Family Division
Dorchester	Grafton Superior	Grafton Probate	Plymouth District	Lebanon Family Division
Dover	Strafford Superior	Strafford Probate	Dover District	N/A
Dublin	Cheshire Superior	Cheshire Probate	Jaffrey/Peterborough District	N/A
Dummer	Coos Superior	Coos Probate	Berlin District	Berlin Family Division
Dunbarton	Merrimack Superior	Merrimack Probate	Concord District	N/A
Durham	Strafford Superior	Strafford Probate	Durham District	N/A
East Kingston	Rockingham Superior	Rockingham Probate	Exeter District	Brentwood Family Division
Easton	Grafton Superior	Grafton Probate	Littleton District	Littleton Family Division
Eaton	Carroll Superior	Carroll Probate	No. Carroll District	Conway Family Division
Effingham	Carroll Superior	Carroll Probate	So. Carroll District	Ossipee Family Division
Ellsworth	Grafton Superior	Grafton Probate	Plymouth District	Plymouth Family Division
Enfield	Grafton Superior	Grafton Probate	Lebanon District	Lebanon Family Division
Epping	Rockingham Superior	Rockingham Probate	Exeter District	Brentwood Family Division
Epsom	Merrimack Superior	Merrimack Probate	Concord District	N/A
Errol	Coos Superior	Coos Probate	Colebrook District	Colebrook Family Division
Erving's Location	Coos Superior	Coos Probate	Colebrook District	Colebrook Family Division
Exeter	Rockingham Superior	Rockingham Probate	Exeter District	Brentwood Family Division
Farmington	Strafford Superior	Strafford Probate	Rochester District	N/A
Fitzwilliam	Cheshire Superior	Cheshire Probate	Jaffrey/Peterborough District	N/A
Francestown	Hillsborough North Superior	Hillsborough Probate	Goffstown District	N/A
Franconia	Grafton Superior	Grafton Probate	Littleton District	Littleton Family Division
Franklin	Merrimack Superior	Merrimack Probate	Franklin District	N/A
Freedom	Carroll Superior	Carroll Probate	So. Carroll District	Ossipee Family Division
Fremont	Rockingham Superior	Rockingham Probate	Exeter District	Brentwood Family Division
Gilford	Belknap Superior	Belknap Probate	Laconia District	Laconia Family Division
Gilmanton	Belknap Superior	Belknap Probate	Laconia District	Laconia Family Division
Gilsum	Cheshire Superior	Cheshire Probate	Hooksett District	N/A
Glen	Carroll Superior	Carroll Probate	No. Carroll District	Conway Family Division
Goffstown	Hillsborough North Superior	Hillsborough Probate	Goffstown District	N/A
Gorham	Coos Superior	Coos Probate	Gorham District	Berlin Family Division
Goshen	Sullivan Superior	Sullivan Probate	Newport District	Newport Family Division
Grafton	Grafton Superior	Grafton Probate	Lebanon District	Lebanon Family Division
Grantham	Sullivan Superior	Sullivan Probate	Newport District	Newport Family Division
Green's Grant	Coos Superior	Coos Probate	Gorham District	Berlin Family Division
Greenfield	Hillsborough North Superior	Hillsborough Probate	Jaffrey/Peterborough District	N/A
Greenland	Rockingham Superior	Rockingham Probate	Portsmouth District	Portsmouth Family Division
Greenville	Hillsborough South Superior	Hillsborough Probate	Jaffrey/Peterborough District	N/A
Groton	Grafton Superior	Grafton Probate	Plymouth District	Plymouth Family Division
Hadley's Purchase	Coos Superior	Coos Probate	No. Carroll District	Conway Family Division
Hale's Location	Carroll Superior	Carroll Probate	No. Carroll District	Conway Family Division
Hampstead	Rockingham Superior	Rockingham Probate	Plaistow District	Brentwood Family Division
Hampton Falls	Rockingham Superior	Rockingham Probate	Hampton District	Portsmouth Family Division
Hampton	Rockingham Superior	Rockingham Probate	Hampton District	Portsmouth Family Division
Hancock	Hillsborough North Superior	Hillsborough Probate	Jaffrey/Peterborough District	N/A
Hanover	Grafton Superior	Grafton Probate	Lebanon District	Lebanon Family Division
Harrisville	Cheshire Superior	Cheshire Probate	Hooksett District	N/A
Hart's Location	Coos Superior	Coos Probate	No. Carroll District	Conway Family Division
Haverhill	Grafton Superior	Grafton Probate	Haverhill District	No. Haverhill Family Division
Hebron	Grafton Superior	Grafton Probate	Plymouth District	Plymouth Family Division
Henniker	Merrimack Superior	Merrimack Probate	Henniker District	N/A
Hill	Merrimack Superior	Merrimack Probate	Franklin District	N/A
Hillsborough	Hillsborough North Superior	Hillsborough Probate	Hillsborough District	N/A
Hinsdale	Cheshire Superior	Cheshire Probate	Keene District	N/A
Holderness	Grafton Superior	Grafton Probate	Plymouth District	Plymouth Family Division
Hollis	Hillsborough South Superior	Hillsborough Probate	Nashua District	N/A
Hooksett	Merrimack Superior	Merrimack Probate	Hooksett District	N/A
Hopkinton	Merrimack Superior	Merrimack Probate	Concord District	N/A
Hudson	Hillsborough South Superior	Hillsborough Probate	Nashua District	N/A
Jackson	Carroll Superior	Carroll Probate	No. Carroll District	Conway Family Division
Jaffrey	Cheshire Superior	Cheshire Probate	Jaffrey/Peterborough District	N/A
Jefferson	Coos Superior	Coos Probate	Lancaster District	Lancaster Family Division
Keene	Cheshire Superior	Cheshire Probate	Keene District	N/A
Kensington	Rockingham Superior	Rockingham Probate	Exeter District	Brentwood Family Division
Kilkenny	Coos Superior	Coos Probate	Lancaster District	Lancaster Family Division
Kingston	Rockingham Superior	Rockingham Probate	Plaistow District	Brentwood Family Division
Laconia	Belknap Superior	Belknap Probate	Laconia District	Laconia Family Division
Lancaster	Coos Superior	Coos Probate	Lancaster District	Lancaster Family Division
Landaff	Grafton Superior	Grafton Probate	Haverhill District	No. Haverhill Family Division
Langdon	Sullivan Superior	Sullivan Probate	Claremont District	Claremont Family Division
Lebanon	Grafton Superior	Grafton Probate	Lebanon District	Lebanon Family Division
Lee	Strafford Superior	Strafford Probate	Durham District	N/A
Lempster	Sullivan Superior	Sullivan Probate	Newport District	Newport Family Division
Lincoln	Grafton Superior	Grafton Probate	Plymouth District	Plymouth Family Division
Lisbon	Grafton Superior	Grafton Probate	Littleton District	Littleton Family Division
Litchfield	Hillsborough South Superior	Hillsborough Probate	Merrimack District	N/A
Littleton	Grafton Superior	Grafton Probate	Littleton District	Littleton Family Division
Livermore (within Saco River watershed)	Grafton Superior	Grafton Probate	So. Carroll District	Conway Family Division
Livermore (not within Saco River watershed)	Grafton Superior	Grafton Probate	Plymouth District	Plymouth Family Division
Londonderry	Rockingham Superior	Rockingham Probate	Derry District	Derry Family Division
Loudon	Merrimack Superior	Merrimack Probate	Concord District	N/A
Low & Burbank's Grant	Coos Superior	Coos Probate	Gorham District	Berlin Family Division
Lyman	Grafton Superior	Grafton Probate	Littleton District	Littleton Family Division
Lyme	Grafton Superior	Grafton Probate	Lebanon District	Lebanon Family Division
Lyndeborough	Hillsborough North Superior	Hillsborough Probate	Milford District	N/A
Madbury	Strafford Superior	Strafford Probate	Durham District	N/A
Madison	Carroll Superior	Carroll Probate	No. Carroll District	Conway Family Division
Manchester	Hillsborough North Superior	Hillsborough Probate	Manchester District	N/A
Marlborough	Cheshire Superior	Cheshire Probate	Keene District	N/A
Marlow	Cheshire Superior	Cheshire Probate	Keene District	N/A
Martin's Location	Coos Superior	Coos Probate	Gorham District	Berlin Family Division
Mason	Hillsborough South Superior	Hillsborough Probate	Milford District	N/A
Meredith	Belknap Superior	Belknap Probate	Laconia District	Laconia Family Division
Merrimack	Hillsborough South Superior	Hillsborough Probate	Merrimack District	N/A
Middleton	Strafford Superior	Strafford Probate	Rochester District	N/A
Milan	Coos Superior	Coos Probate	Berlin District	Berlin Family Division
Milford	Hillsborough South Superior	Hillsborough Probate	Milford District	N/A
Millsfield	Coos Superior	Coos Probate	Colebrook District	Colebrook Family Division
Milton	Strafford Superior	Strafford Probate	Rochester District	N/A
Monroe	Grafton Superior	Grafton Probate	Littleton District	Littleton Family Division
Mont Vernon	Hillsborough North Superior	Hillsborough Probate	Milford District	N/A
Moultonborough	Carroll Superior	Carroll Probate	So. Carroll District	Ossipee Family Division
Nashua	Hillsborough South Superior	Hillsborough Probate	Nashua District	N/A
Nelson	Cheshire Superior	Cheshire Probate	Keene District	N/A
New Boston	Hillsborough North Superior	Hillsborough Probate	Goffstown District	N/A
New Castle	Rockingham Superior	Rockingham Probate	Portsmouth District	Portsmouth Family Division
New Durham	Strafford Superior	Strafford Probate	Rochester District	N/A
New Hampton	Belknap Superior	Belknap Probate	Laconia District	Laconia Family Division
New Ipswich	Hillsborough South Superior	Hillsborough Probate	Jaffrey/Peterborough District	N/A
New London	Merrimack Superior	Merrimack Probate	New London District	Newport Family Division
Newbury	Merrimack Superior	Merrimack Probate	New London District	Newport Family Division
Newfields	Rockingham Superior	Rockingham Probate	Exeter District	Portsmouth Family Division
Newington	Rockingham Superior	Rockingham Probate	Portsmouth District	Portsmouth Family Division
Newmarket	Rockingham Superior	Rockingham Probate	Exeter District	Portsmouth Family Division
Newport	Sullivan Superior	Sullivan Probate	Newport District	Newport Family Division
Newton	Rockingham Superior	Rockingham Probate	Plaistow District	Brentwood Family Division
North Hampton	Rockingham Superior	Rockingham Probate	Hampton District	Portsmouth Family Division
Northfield	Merrimack Superior	Merrimack Probate	Franklin District	N/A
Northumberland	Coos Superior	Coos Probate	Lancaster District	Lancaster Family Division
Northwood	Rockingham Superior	Rockingham Probate	Auburn District	Brentwood Family Division
Nottingham	Rockingham Superior	Rockingham Probate	Auburn District	Brentwood Family Division
Odell	Coos Superior	Coos Probate	Colebrook District	Colebrook Family Division
Orange	Grafton Superior	Grafton Probate	Lebanon District	Lebanon Family Division
Orford	Grafton Superior	Grafton Probate	Lebanon District	Lebanon Family Division
Ossipee	Carroll Superior	Carroll Probate	So. Carroll District	Ossipee Family Division
Pelham	Hillsborough South Superior	Hillsborough Probate	Salem District	Salem Family Division
Pembroke	Merrimack Superior	Merrimack Probate	Hooksett District	N/A
Peterborough	Hillsborough North Superior	Hillsborough Probate	Jaffrey/Peterborough District	N/A
Piermont	Grafton Superior	Grafton Probate	Haverhill District	No. Haverhill Family Division
Pinkham's Grant	Coos Superior	Coos Probate	Gorham District	Berlin Family Division
Pittsburg	Coos Superior	Coos Probate	Colebrook District	Colebrook Family Division
Pittsfield	Merrimack Superior	Merrimack Probate	Concord District	N/A
Plainfield	Sullivan Superior	Sullivan Probate	Claremont District	Claremont Family Division
Plaistow	Rockingham Superior	Rockingham Probate	Plaistow District	Brentwood Family Division
Plymouth	Grafton Superior	Grafton Probate	Plymouth District	Plymouth Family Division
Portsmouth	Rockingham Superior	Rockingham Probate	Portsmouth District	Portsmouth Family Division
Randolph	Coos Superior	Coos Probate	Gorham District	Berlin Family Division
Raymond	Rockingham Superior	Rockingham Probate	Auburn District	Brentwood Family Division
Richmond	Cheshire Superior	Cheshire Probate	Keene District	N/A
Rindge	Cheshire Superior	Cheshire Probate	Jaffrey/Peterborough District	N/A
Rochester	Strafford Superior	Strafford Probate	Rochester District	N/A
Rollinsford	Strafford Superior	Strafford Probate	Dover District	N/A
Roxbury	Cheshire Superior	Cheshire Probate	Keene District	N/A
Rumney	Grafton Superior	Grafton Probate	Plymouth District	Plymouth Family Division
Rye	Rockingham Superior	Rockingham Probate	Portsmouth District	Portsmouth Family Division
Salem	Rockingham Superior	Rockingham Probate	Salem District	Salem Family Division
Salisbury	Merrimack Superior	Merrimack Probate	Franklin District	N/A
Sanbornton	Belknap Superior	Belknap Probate	Franklin District	N/A
Sanbornville	Carroll Superior	Carroll Probate	So. Carroll District	Ossipee Family Division
Sandown	Rockingham Superior	Rockingham Probate	Derry District	Derry Family Division
Sandwich	Carroll Superior	Carroll Probate	So. Carroll District	Ossipee Family Division
Sargent's Purchase	Coos Superior	Coos Probate	Gorham District	Berlin Family Division
Seabrook	Rockingham Superior	Rockingham Probate	Hampton District	Portsmouth Family Division
Second College Grant	Coos Superior	Coos Probate	Colebrook District	Colebrook Family Division
Sharon	Hillsborough South Superior	Hillsborough Probate	Jaffrey/Peterborough District	N/A
Shelburne	Coos Superior	Coos Probate	Gorham District	Berlin Family Division
Somersworth	Strafford Superior	Strafford Probate	Dover District	N/A
South Hampton	Rockingham Superior	Rockingham Probate	Hampton District	Portsmouth Family Division
Springfield	Sullivan Superior	Sullivan Probate	Newport District	Newport Family Division
Stark	Coos Superior	Coos Probate	Lancaster District	Lancaster Family Division
Stewartstown	Coos Superior	Coos Probate	Colebrook District	Colebrook Family Division
Stoddard	Cheshire Superior	Cheshire Probate	Keene District	N/A
Strafford	Strafford Superior	Strafford Probate	Rochester District	N/A
Stratford	Coos Superior	Coos Probate	Colebrook District	Colebrook Family Division
Stratham	Rockingham Superior	Rockingham Probate	Exeter District	Portsmouth Family Division
Success	Coos Superior	Coos Probate	Berlin District	Berlin Family Division
Sugar Hill	Grafton Superior	Grafton Probate	Littleton District	Littleton Family Division
Sullivan	Cheshire Superior	Cheshire Probate	Keene District	N/A
Sunapee	Sullivan Superior	Sullivan Probate	Newport District	Newport Family Division
Surry	Cheshire Superior	Cheshire Probate	Keene District	N/A
Sutton	Merrimack Superior	Merrimack Probate	New London District	Newport Family Division
Swanzey	Cheshire Superior	Cheshire Probate	Keene District	N/A
Tamworth	Carroll Superior	Carroll Probate	So. Carroll District	Ossipee Family Division
Temple	Hillsborough South Superior	Hillsborough Probate	Jaffrey/Peterborough District	N/A
Thompson & Meserve's Purchase	Coos Superior	Coos Probate	Gorham District	Berlin Family Division
Thornton	Grafton Superior	Grafton Probate	Plymouth District	Plymouth Family Division
Tilton	Belknap Superior	Belknap Probate	Franklin District	N/A
Troy	Cheshire Superior	Cheshire Probate	Keene District	N/A
Tuftonboro	Carroll Superior	Carroll Probate	So. Carroll District	Ossipee Family Division
Unity	Sullivan Superior	Sullivan Probate	Claremont District	Claremont Family Division
Wakefield	Carroll Superior	Carroll Probate	So. Carroll District	Ossipee Family Division
Walpole	Cheshire Superior	Cheshire Probate	Keene District	N/A
Warner	Merrimack Superior	Merrimack Probate	Henniker District	N/A
Warren	Grafton Superior	Grafton Probate	Haverhill District	No. Haverhill Family Division
Washington	Sullivan Superior	Sullivan Probate	Newport District	Newport Family Division
Waterville Valley (within Saco River watershed)	Grafton Superior	Grafton Probate	So. Carroll District	N/A
Waterville Valley (not within Saco River watershed)	Grafton Superior	Grafton Probate	Plymouth District	Plymouth Family Division
Weare	Hillsborough North Superior	Hillsborough Probate	Goffstown District	N/A
Webster	Merrimack Superior	Merrimack Probate	Franklin District	N/A
Wentworth	Grafton Superior	Grafton Probate	Plymouth District	Plymouth Family Division
Wentworth Location	Coos Superior	Coos Probate	Colebrook District	Colebrook Family Division
Westmoreland	Cheshire Superior	Cheshire Probate	Keene District	N/A
Whitefield	Coos Superior	Coos Probate	Lancaster District	Lancaster Family Division
Wilmot	Merrimack Superior	Merrimack Probate	New London District	Newport Family Division
Wilton	Hillsborough South Superior	Hillsborough Probate	Milford District	N/A
Winchester	Cheshire Superior	Cheshire Probate	Keene District	N/A
Windham	Rockingham Superior	Rockingham Probate	Salem District	Salem Family Division
Windsor	Hillsborough North Superior	Hillsborough Probate	Hillsborough District	N/A
Wolfeboro	Carroll Superior	Carroll Probate	So. Carroll District	Ossipee Family Division
Woodstock	Grafton Superior	Grafton Probate	Plymouth District	Plymouth Family Division
