= Davit II =

Davit II may refer to:

- Davit II, Caucasian Albanian Catholicos in 765–769
- David IV of Georgia, the Builder, King in 1073–1125; sometimes referred to as David II
- Davit II, Catholicoi of Aghtamar in 1346–c. 1368
- David II, Catholicos-Patriarch of Georgia, ruled in 1426–1428
- David II of Kakheti, king of Kakheti (eastern Georgia) in 1709–1722
- Davit II Jughayetsi, prelate of the Armenian Apostolic Diocese of Isfahan and Southern Iran in (1725–1728)
- David II of Imereti, king of Imerti (western Georgia) in 1784—1791

== See also ==
- David II (disambiguation)
