= Richard B. McNamara =

American judge

Justice, Merrimack Superior Court, New Hampshire
- In office October 2009 – July 4, 2020
- Appointed by: Governor John Lynch and Executive Council of the State of New Hampshire

Presiding Justice, Business and Commercial Dispute Docket
- In office October 2009 – July 4, 2020
- Succeeded by: David A. Anderson

Personal details
- Born: New Jersey
- Education: Boston College (A.B. 1972); Boston College Law School (J.D. 1975)

Richard B. McNamara is a retired American judge who served on the Superior Court of Merrimack County, New Hampshire, for eleven years, after being selected as the state's first business court judge. He was recruited out of law school to serve as a prosecutor in the New Hampshire Office of the Attorney General, where he handled murder cases very early in his career. He has authored leading New Hampshire law treatises on criminal and civil law topics. He was president of the New Hampshire Bar Association, and worked as a commercial litigator for 30 years at one law firm before his appointment as a judge to New Hampshire's specialized Business and Commercial Dispute Docket.

== Career as a lawyer and legal author ==
In 1975, New Hampshire Deputy Attorney General David Souter recruited McNamara out of law school to join the Office of the Attorney General, who was then Warren Rudman. Souter would go on to become an Associate Justice of the Supreme Court, and Rudman a two-term senator from New Hampshire.

While in the Attorney General's Office, McNamara tried murder cases to juries before he was thirty years old. In 1980, based on his experience in the department, McNamara authored a treatise on New Hampshire criminal law and criminal procedure, Criminal Practice and Procedure. This became the first book published as part of the New Hampshire Practice Series. As of 2023, McNamara's Criminal Practice and Procedure is in its seventh edition and consists of three separate volumes. This treatise has been relied upon in New Hampshire's federal courts and its Supreme Court. In 1982, McNamara authored Constitutional Limitations on Criminal Procedure.

After four years as a prosecutor for the state of New Hampshire, McNamara spent the next 30 years in private practice with the law firm Wiggin & Nourie in Manchester. Early on at Wiggin & Nourie, he worked for insured defendants and handled some criminal defense matters, but his prime focus eventually became commercial litigation. One of his notable commercial matters involved nationwide litigation representing small auto dealerships, over a ten-year period, that resulted in a settlement in excess of $300 million.

As a lawyer, he was president of the New Hampshire Bar Association for the 2006 to 2007 term, and chair of that Bar Association's Legislation Committee from 2007 to 2009. In 2006, he was also a member of the New Hampshire Supreme Court's Task Force on Public Access to Court Records, and served on the task force's drafting committee. While vice-president of the Bar Association, in 2005, he served a one-year term on the New Hampshire Supreme Court's Professional Conduct Committee, part of that court's attorney discipline system.

McNamara also has authored a two-volume law treatise for the New Hampshire Practice Series, Personal Injury: Tort and Insurance Practice, which is now in its fourth edition.

== Judicial service ==
In 2008, the New Hampshire legislature passed a law enabling New Hampshire's Supreme Court to create a specialized business court within the New Hampshire Superior Court system, the state's trial level courts of general jurisdiction. The new business court would be known as the Business and Commercial Dispute Docket (BCD). The statute limits the BCD's jurisdiction to disputes of a business or commercial nature. This law also provided that New Hampshire's "governor with the consent of the executive council may appoint the first presiding justice of the business and commercial dispute docket, who shall be qualified by reason of such person's knowledge and experience in business and commercial law matters." Following the enabling legislation, the Supreme Court did adopt a rule governing the BCD's operations.

Those creating this new court recognized that "finding the right judge will be crucial to the success of the business court." That person should have "extensive experience and understand[] complex financial and commercial matters...." Business court judge Allan van Gestel in neighboring Massachusetts was considered the model for the first business court judge. New Hampshire Chief Justice John T. Broderick Jr., who was integral to creating the BCD, tied the new court's chances for early success to the first appointed judge's recognition, knowledge, and credibility within the legal and business law communities.

In 2009, after a vetting process by a Judicial Selection Committee, McNamara was nominated by New Hampshire Governor John Lynch to serve on the Merrimack County Superior Court in Concord, as the first BCD judge. The nomination was confirmed by the New Hampshire Executive Council. McNamara was appointed in October 2009, and the BCD started operations in December 2009. McNamara went on to serve as the BCD's sole judge until his mandatory retirement eleven years later. He authored numerous written legal opinions during that time.

Among other notable decisions as a judge, McNamara has addressed: whether New Hampshire's Supreme Court would adopt the tort of corporate freeze-out, in the context of oppression of minority shareholders; the state's Right-to-Know law; the suspension of a public official by the state's attorney general; the disclosure of information presented to a grand jury; ex parte contact with witnesses; and whether to grant injunctive relief concerning drinking water standards until the governmental agency at issue had carried out a required analysis.

McNamara was involved in forming the business court, as well as serving on it, and he worked with all three branches of government and the business community in doing so. Years before becoming a judge, in 2001, McNamara had written a lengthy article on the role of New Hampshire's courts in relation to its other branches of government, The Separation of Powers Principle and the Role of the Courts in New Hampshire. McNamara also met with business court judges from Massachusetts and Rhode Island, and studied other states' business court best practices, to learn what ideas and practices might be incorporated into the BCD.

McNamara's docket as a judge also included criminal cases and other kinds of civil matters. He has described the most difficult aspect of being a judge as sentencing those found guilty, or pleading guilty, in criminal cases. It was part of his practice to take considerable time with defendants during guilty plea colloquies to make sure they understood their rights and had a sense of being treated fairly.

During his time as a judge, McNamara was a member of the New Hampshire Supreme Court's Advisory Committee on Rules.

After retirement, McNamara was appointed as a Superior Court Referee. Under New Hampshire law, retired superior court judges may be appointed as referees who can be assigned "to take testimony, receive and review evidence, and make recommendations for findings of fact and conclusions of law" in the superior court, though they cannot preside over jury trials or enter final orders in a case.

== Education ==
McNamara received his Artium Baccalaureus degree from Boston College in 1972, and his Juris Doctor degree from the Boston College Law School in 1975. In law school, he was editor-in-chief of the Uniform Commercial Code Reporter Digest.

== Positions and memberships ==
McNamara has held the following positions or memberships, among others;

- First judge selected, New Hampshire Superior Court Business and Commercial Dispute Docket (2009–2020)
- President, New Hampshire Bar Association (2006–2007)
- Member, New Hampshire Supreme Court Task Force on Public Access to Records
- Chair, New Hampshire Bar Association Legislation Committee (2007–2009)
- Member, New Hampshire Supreme Court Advisory Committee on Rules
- Member, New Hampshire Supreme Court Professional Conduct Committee
- Editor-in-chief, Uniform Commercial Code Reporter Digest, Boston College Law School
