= 1990 United States Senate election in New Hampshire =

- November 6, 1990
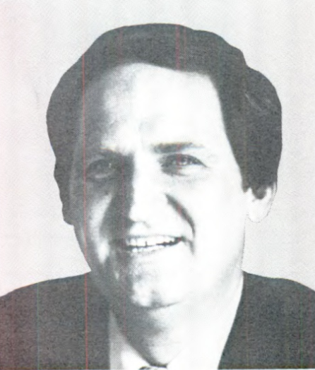

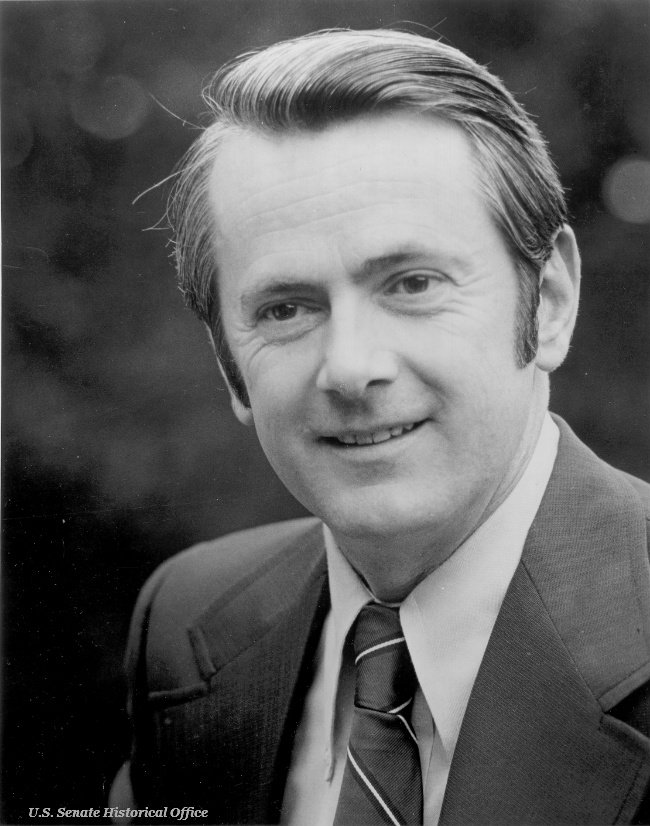
Nominee	Bob Smith	John A. Durkin
Party	Republican	Democratic
Popular vote	189,792	91,299
Percentage	65.13%	31.33%
- Smith: 40–50% 50–60% 60–70% 70–80% 80–90% >90% Durkin: 40–50% 50–60% >90%
U.S. senator before election
Gordon J. Humphrey
Republican
Elected U.S. Senator
Bob Smith
Republican

The 1990 United States Senate election in New Hampshire was held on November 6, 1990. Incumbent Republican U.S. Senator Gordon J. Humphrey decided to retire and not run for re-election to a third term. Republican Bob Smith won the open seat, easily defeating the Democratic nominee, former senator John A. Durkin.

== Republican primary ==
=== Candidates ===
- Tom Christo, attorney
- Theo deWinter, engineer
- Bob Smith, U.S. Representative from Wolfeboro
- Ewing Smith, candidate for Senate in 1980

=== Results ===
1990 Republican U.S. Senate primary
Party	Candidate	Votes	%
Republican	Bob Smith	56,215	65.00%
Republican	Tom Christo	25,286	29.24%
Republican	Theo deWinter	2,768	3.20%
Republican	Ewing Smith	2,009	2.32%
Democratic	John Rauh (write-in)	94	0.11%
Democratic	John A. Durkin (write-in)	66	0.08%
Democratic	James Donchess (write-in)	48	0.06%
Total votes		86,486	100.00%

== Democratic primary ==
=== Candidates ===
- James W. Donchess, Mayor of Nashua
- John A. Durkin, former U.S. Senator
- John Rauh, founder of Americans for Campaign Reform and former CEO of Griffon Corporation

=== Results ===
1990 Democratic U.S. Senate primary
Party	Candidate	Votes	%
Democratic	John A. Durkin	20,222	41.37%
Democratic	James W. Donchess	15,205	31.10%
Democratic	John Rauh	12,935	26.46%
Write-in	All others	523	1.07%
Total votes		48,885	100.00%

== General election ==
=== Candidates ===
- John A. Durkin, former U.S. Senator (Democratic)
- John G. Elsnau (Libertarian)
- Bob Smith, U.S. Representative from Wolfeboro (Republican)

=== Campaign ===
The 1990 New Hampshire Senate race garnered national news after John Durkin, previously a senator from New Hampshire in 1975–1980, made a remark that was perceived as a racial slur against the Japanese. Durkin told reporters interviewing him, "If you want a Jap in the United States Senate, then vote for Bob Smith". "Jap" is a term that was frequently used in WWII to describe the Japanese, and was, by 1990, considered racist terminology. The quote destroyed Durkin's campaign and he ended up losing to Smith by a more than 2-to-1 margin, a devastating blow for the ex-Senator.

=== Results ===
1990 U.S. Senate election in New Hampshire
Party	Candidate	Votes	%	±%
Republican	Bob Smith	189,792	65.13%	
Democratic	John A. Durkin	91,299	31.33%	
Libertarian	John G. Elsnau	9,102	3.34%	
Write-in		585	0.20%	
Majority		98,493	33.80%	
Turnout		291,393		
Republican hold		Swing		

== See also ==
- 1990 United States Senate elections
