= Berkshire National Fish Hatchery =

Fish hatchery in Massachusetts, United States

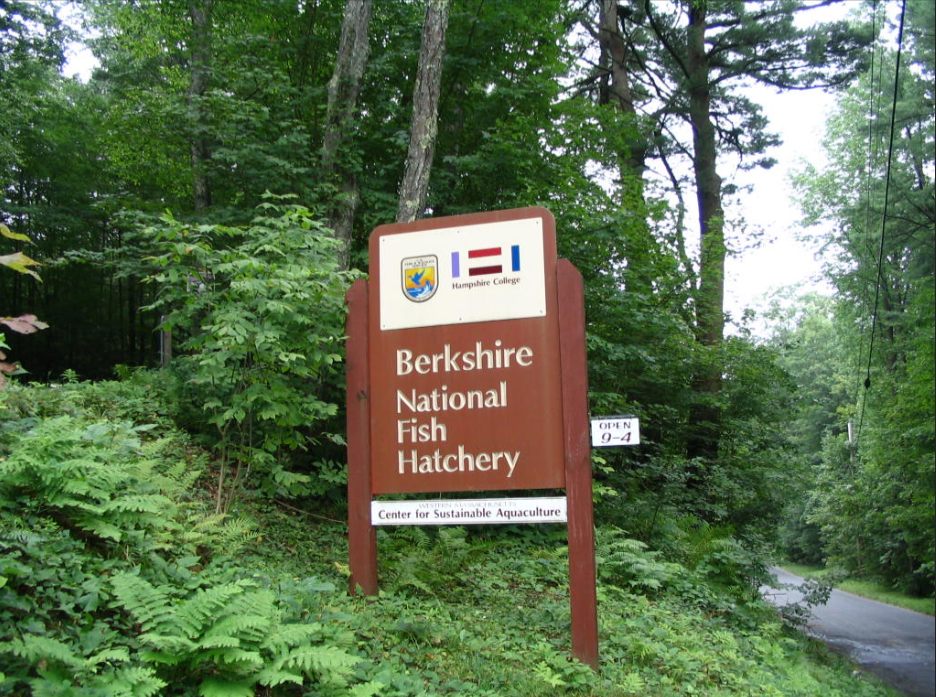
- The entrance sign on August 25, 2004.

- Location within Massachusetts Location within the United States
- Location: New Marlborough, Massachusetts, United States
- Coordinates: 42°09′51.69384″N 073°15′02.21558″W
- Area: 148 acres (60 ha)
- Established: 1919
- Governing body: United States Fish and Wildlife Service
- Website: www.fws.gov/fish-hatchery/berkshire

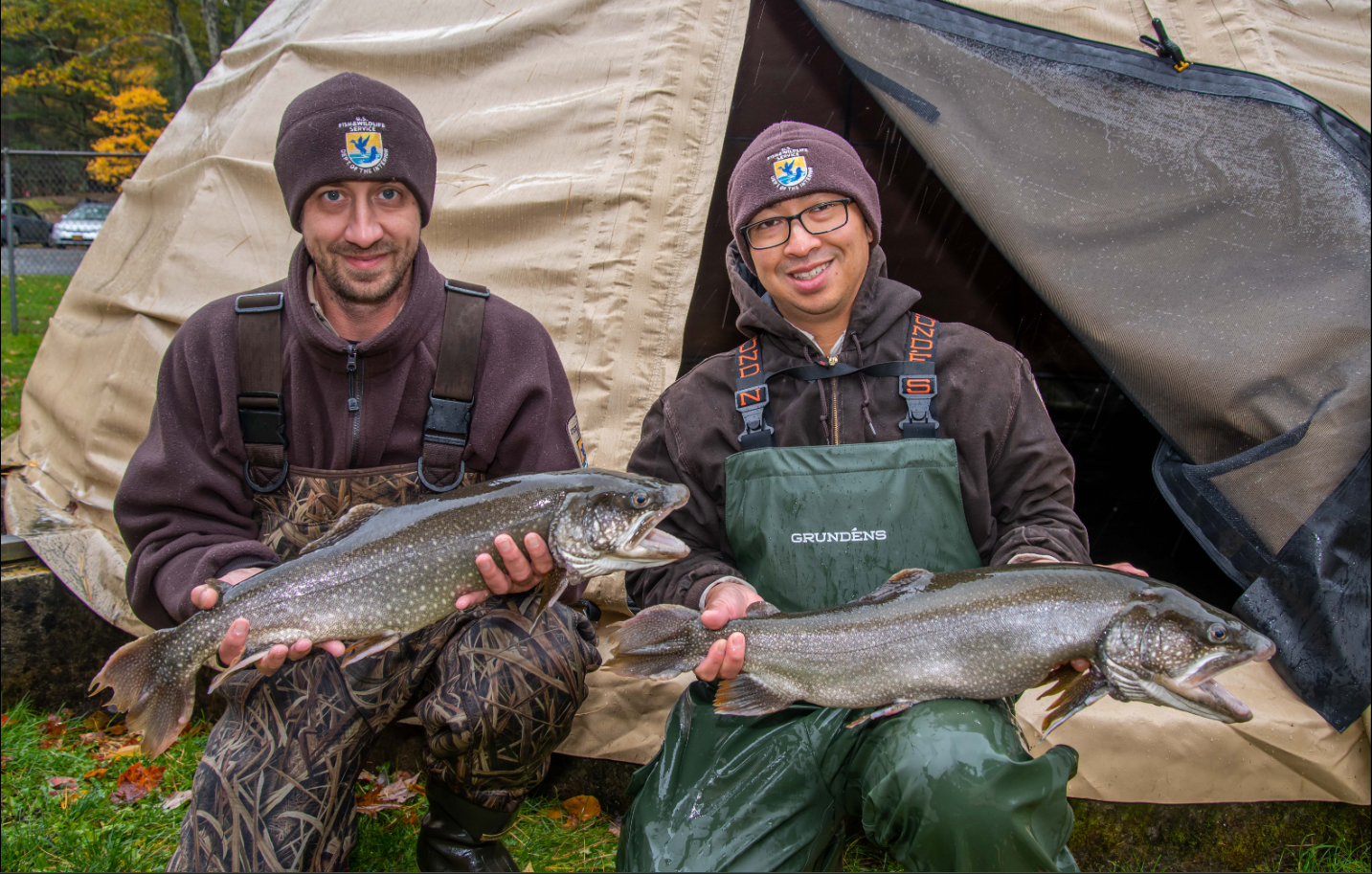
Hatchery employees showcase two adult brook trout (Salvelinus fontinalis).

The Berkshire National Fish Hatchery is a fish hatchery located in New Marlborough, Massachusetts, in the United States. It is managed by the United States Fish and Wildlife Service. Like other components of the National Fish Hatchery System, the hatchery's mission is to conserve, protect, and enhance fish, wildlife, plants, and their habitats, as well to cooperate with like-minded partners to further these goals. As of 2025, its specific purpose is to produce lake trout (Salvelinus namaycush) to stock Lake Erie and Lake Ontario as well as brook trout (Salvelinus fontinalis) for the stocking of local lakes and streams. It is the only fish hatchery in the Berkshires.

== History ==
The Berkshire National Fish Hatchery traces its history to 1875, when Dr. Samuel Camp and Jason Cooley of Great Barrington, Massachusetts, purchased an undeveloped 10.5-acre (4.2-hectare) parcel of land along the nearby Konkapot River to establish a fish hatchery supported by Camp's independent financial resources. Camp selected the site because of its proximity to a natural spring that supplied 48 °F (9 °C) water year-round through a 10-inch (25.4 cm) pipe, and he used the property to entertain friends as well as raise fish. In 1891, the Government of Massachusetts officially recognized the Berkshire Trout Hatchery Club, under whose management the hatchery became by the mid-1890s a reputable enterprise that supplied fish for streams and lakes throughout Massachusetts and in Connecticut and New York.

After Camp died in 1901, the site remained the property of his widow, Sarah J. Camp, until 1905, when she sold it to John S. Scully, a banker and philanthropist from Pittsburgh, Pennsylvania, for US$1.00. Scully managed the hatchery both as a commercial enterprise and for pleasure, rearing trout and spending summers there with his family, until his death in October 1914. In the spring of 1916 his widow, Mary E. Scully, presented the then-138-acre (56-hectare) property to the United States Government on the condition that it remain in use as a fish hatchery and as an experimental site for fish culture. The United States Department of Commerce's Bureau of Fisheries accepted the property, officially dedicated it with a memorial tablet in 1919, and subjected it to significant renovations to make it capable of the large-scale rearing of fish.

The hatchery remained in operation as the Bureau of Fisheries merged with other agencies in 1940 to form the United States Department of the Interior's Fish and Wildlife Service, which in turn underwent a major reorganization in 1956 to become the United States Fish and Wildlife Service (USFWS). During its history, the hatchery raised brook trout (Salvelinus fontinalis), brown trout (Salmo trutta), rainbow trout (Oncorhynchus mykiss), and, to a lesser extent, smallmouth bass (Micropterus dolomieu). During the mid-twentieth century, the hatchery distributed an average of 75,000 fish of legal size for recreational fishing yearly to the waters of applicants in Massachusetts, Connecticut, eastern New York, and Vermont, replenishing the populations of native species that had declined due to overfishing and disruption of the natural environment.

After deciding that smaller hatcheries like the Berkshire facility were less economical to operate than larger ones and determining that water resources at the site were insufficient to expand the hatchery to a more efficient size, the U.S. Government began to discuss shutting the hatchery down in 1965. The Massachusetts State Division of Fisheries and Game Board took over the operation of the facility that year to keep it open. In 1969 the U.S. Department of the Interior officially announced that it would close and abandon the Berkshire hatchery, but in July 1969 the Berkshire chapter of the Izaak Walton League, a conservation organization, took over operation of the hatchery, marking the first time the operation of a U.S. Government-owned facility was transferred to a private enterprise, although the hatchery and its site remained U.S. government property. The Izaak Walton League announced its commitment to raising and distributing disease-free trout at the hatchery and to establishing a conservation education center for western Massachusetts on the site. The league acquired 40,000 brook and rainbow trout from the Nashua National Fish Hatchery in Nashua, New Hampshire, in the hope of making the Berkshire hatchery self-sustaining. Despite USFWS skepticism that it could succeed, the fully volunteer-based hatchery operation produced 200,000 trout in its first year, as well as 100,000 Coho salmon (Oncorhynchus kisutch) fingerlings for use in joint project of the U.S. and Massachusetts governments to restock the North River in Plymouth County, Massachusetts.

In 1971, the USFWS's Bureau of Sports Fisheries and Wildlife announced that it would reacquire the hatchery to meet a "crucial need" for raising Atlantic salmon (Salmo salar) for the Connecticut River Salmon Restoration Program, a US$40 million effort by the U.S. Government, the Government of Massachusetts, the Government of Connecticut, the government of New Hampshire, and the Government of Vermont to restore the species to the Connecticut River, from which it largely had disappeared by the early 19th century due to overfishing, pollution, habitat degradation, and dam construction. By August 1971, the hatchery was back under the full control of the USFWS, with a goal of hatching approximately one million Atlantic salmon eggs by the end of 1971 and three million in 1972. In the mid-1970s, the first hatchery-bred salmon were captured when they returned to the river from the Atlantic Ocean; transferred to the Berkshire hatchery, these salmon were spawned there, providing stock for the breeding of a strain of salmon native to the Connecticut River system for the first time. By the early 1980s, nearly 300 salmon returning to the Connecticut River were captured for breeding at the hatchery. The hatchery subsequently played a principal role in the Connecticut River Salmon Restoration Program during the late 20th century.

Despite this success, the administration of President Ronald Reagan in 1982 proposed cutting funding of the Berkshire hatchery. The facility nonetheless managed to operate until 1994, when the USFWS formally closed it due to budgetary constraints and placed it under the supervision of a caretaker. It languished in this status until 1998, when the Western Massachusetts Center for Sustainable Aquaculture (WMCSA) at Hampshire College in Amherst, Massachusetts, proposed use of the facility for educational purposes and to assist the USFWS Fisheries Program, thus paving the way for the hatchery to reopen. In 1999, a group of local individuals formed the Berkshire Hatchery Foundation and with the assistance of the WMCSA began renovation of the neglected facility, which required major repairs. After the hatchery's concrete pools were refurbished and the hatchery building retrofitted with new equipment, the first fish arrived at the hatchery in the spring of 2000. The Gould Farm, located just north of the hatchery's property and the oldest community-based psychiatric rehabilitation organization in the United States, offered additional assistance and entered into a partnership with the hatchery in 2000 to aid in maintaining the facility in exchange for the use of one of the Quarter buildings to house staff.

In August 2006, the Berkshire Hatchery Foundation signed a memorandum of understanding with the USFWS to operate the Berkshire National Fish Hatchery, making it the only U.S. Government fish hatchery run completely by volunteers. The hatchery continued to participate in the Connecticut River Restoration Program until the program was suspended in 2014. The hatchery subsequently shifted its focus to the production of brook trout and lake trout.

== Management ==
As of 2025, the hatchery is operated under the supervision of the USFWS and the Friends of the Berkshire National Fish Hatchery (formerly the Berkshire Hatchery Foundation). It partners with the New York State Department of Environmental Conservation, Great Lakes Fishery Commission, and Great Lakes Restoration Initiative in its Great Lakes work. For stocking native brook trout in local waterways and staging outreach events for visitors, it has assistance from the Friends of the Berkshire National Fish Hatchery.

== Activities ==
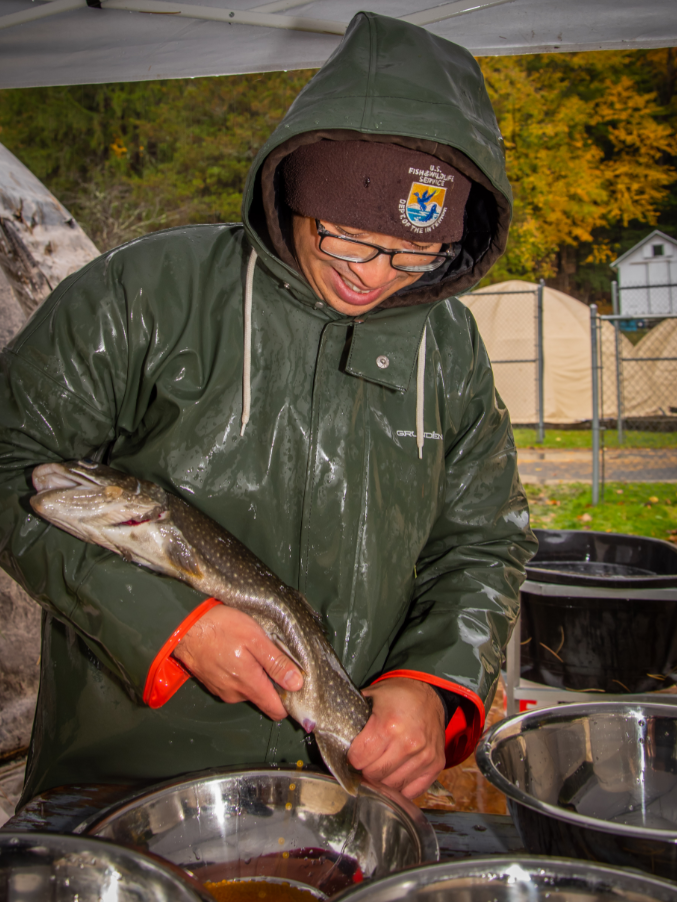
An employee spawns a lake trout (Salvelinus namaycush) at the hatchery.

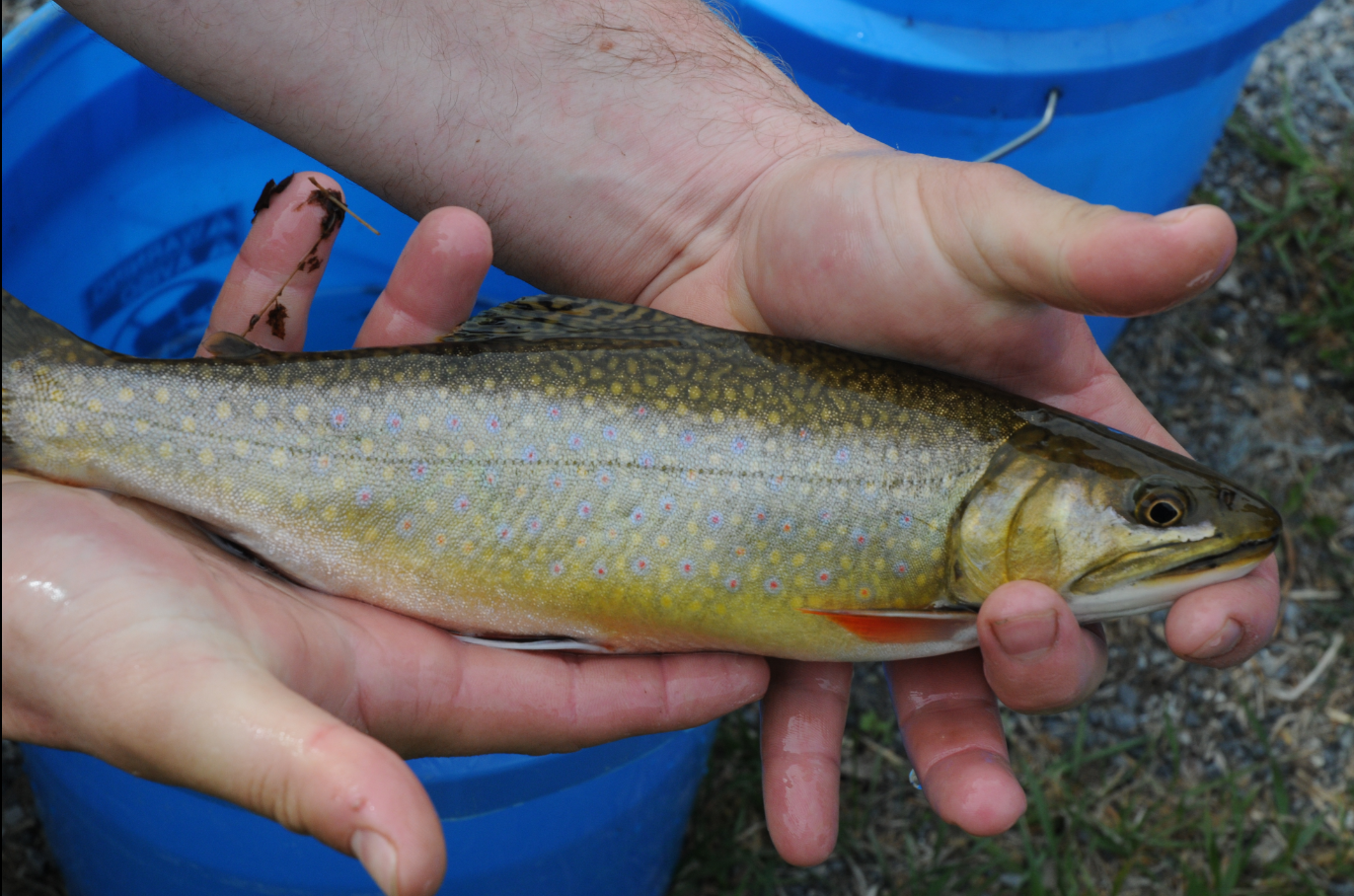
A brook trout (Salvelinus fontinalis) at the hatchery on May 31, 2023.

The Berkshire National Fish Hatchery is part of the USFWS's Fish and Aquatic Conservation Program, which works throughout the United States to restore habitats, prevent and control invasive species, assist Native American tribes and other partners in managing their fish and wildlife resources, advance fisheries science and other aquatic sciences and technologies, foster outdoor recreational opportunities, educate the public on the economic and ecological benefits of aquatic species and their habitats, and address challenges such as climate change.

As of 2025 the Berkshire National Fish Hatchery focuses on restoring Seneca strain lake trout (Salvelinus namaycush) populations in Lake Erie and Lake Ontario, both by raising lake trout until they reach a length of 7 inches (18 cm) and are ready for stocking in the lakes and by supplying multiple strains of lake trout eggs to other facilities of the National Fish Hatchery System as part of the National Broodstock Program. It also provides native brook trout to support recreational fishing opportunities for the public in local lakes and streams as well as waters throughout the Berkshires.

In addition to the raising of fish, the hatchery has a mission of enhancing efforts to expand aquaculture knowledge. It also holds public fishing events for children and military veterans.

== Facilities ==
The Berkshire National Fish Hatchery's facilities consist of six primary buildings, 10 circular concrete rearing pools, a raceway, three fish ponds, an "Outreach Pond," a shop, and a shed. A well field with a catch basin and a well house channel the natural springs that flow through the property. Each minute, the water system feeds 200 US gallons (757 L; 167 imp gal) of clean, oxygen-rich water ideal for raising trout to the hatchery facilities from the aquifer beneath the site.

== Recreation ==
The Berkshire National Fish Hatchery is located in the southwest corner of a 148-acre (60-hectare) site about 0.5-mile (0.8 km) north of the village of Hartsville, Massachusetts. The property lies partly in the northwestern portion of the township of New Marlborough and partly in the township of Monterey and is characterized by steep hills, little level ground, and dense, mature forests. The Konkapot River flows through the western side of the property.

The hatchery is open to the public on weekdays. Visitors have access to an information kiosk and are welcome to roam the property to view the facilities and learn about hatchery operations, the species raised there, fish breeding, the stocking of lakes and streams, and the National Fish Hatchery System. The hatchery building contains a small educational exhibition, and visitors walking the grounds may peek into "fish igloos" and view a memorial monument at the hatchery.

Recreational fishing is permitted in the Konkapot River, where visitors can expect to catch brook, brown, and rainbow trout. Visitors also may fish in the Outreach Pond; surrounded by a dense forest and one of four fish ponds at the hatchery, this pond is stocked heavily with brook trout and supported by hatchery staff members who assist anglers, making fishing in the pond easy even for children and adult fishing novices.

The hatchery grounds include a network of short hiking trails that pass through the area's forests. The 0.29-mile (0.47 km) Red Trail and the 0.39-mile (0.63 km) Upper Trail are moderately strenuous and climb about 200 feet (61 m) to views of a geologic kettle. The 0.21-mile (0.34 km) Kettle Trail, the 0.21-mile (0.34 km) Nature Trail, and the 0.13-mile (0.21 km) Shelby Loop or Shelby Trail offer easy walks through dense forests at lower elevations surrounding the Outreach Pond and offer visitors opportunities for birdwatching and other wildlife observation. A sixth trail, the 0.06-mile (0.1 km) Fishing Trail, also lies on the property. During the winter, visitors also can use the trails for snowshoeing and tracking animal footprints.

== See also ==
- National Fish Hatchery System
- List of National Fish Hatcheries in the United States
