= King David (disambiguation) =

David was the second king of the United Kingdom of Israel and Judah.

King David may also refer to:

== People ==
=== Kings ===
- David I (disambiguation)
- David II (disambiguation)
- David III of Tao
- David IV of Georgia (1073–1125)
- David V of Georgia (died 1155)
- David VI of Georgia (1225–1293)
- David VII of Georgia (1215–1270)
- David VIII of Georgia (1273–1311)
- David IX of Georgia (died 1360)
- David X of Kartli (1482–1526)

=== Others ===
- Capleton (born 1967), Jamaican reggae artist also known as King David
- Kalākaua (1836–1891), born David Laʻamea Kamanakapuʻu Māhinulani Nālaʻiaʻehuokalani Lumialani Kalākaua, the penultimate Hawaiian monarch
- David Barksdale (1947–1974), Chicago gang leader

== Other uses ==
- King David (film), 1985 biographical film starring Richard Gere
- King David (musical), 1997 musical created by Tim Rice and Alan Menken
- Le roi David, composition by Arthur Honegger
- The King David Hotel in Jerusalem
- Nickname for David Hartley, Cragg Vale coiner

== See also ==
- David King (disambiguation)
- King David School (disambiguation)
