= Thomas K. Christo =

American lawyer (1948–2008)

Thomas K. Christo (February 12, 1948 – February 9, 2008) was an American lawyer and Republican political operative from Hampton Falls, New Hampshire.

== Early life and education ==
Christo was born in 1948 in Southbridge, Massachusetts to Dorothy (Lapery) Christo and Christi Christo. He pursued a career in law.

== Career ==
Christo was involved in the development of computer law, with his most famous case, IBM Corp. v. Catamore Enterprises, Inc., establishing the legal distinction between hardware and software.

Christo was active in Republican politics, running for the United States Senate in the 1990 United States Senate election in New Hampshire. He served as the finance chairman for the New Hampshire Republican Party and was on President George H. Bush's Economic Advisory Council. Additionally, he served as the New Hampshire state finance chairman for Rudy Giuliani's 2008 presidential campaign.

== Personal life and death ==
Christo was married to Ellen V. Christo for 11 years. He was a member of St. George's Albanian Orthodox Cathedral in Boston.

Christo died on February 9, 2008, at Massachusetts General Hospital as a result of a brain aneurysm. His funeral service was held at Stratham Community Church in Stratham, New Hampshire.
