= David D. King (jurist) =

American judge

Hon. David D. King

New Hampshire Circuit Court Administrative Judge
- In office 2017-2018 – July 1, 2024
- Nominated by: Chris Sununu
- Preceded by: Hon. Edwin W. Kelly
- Succeeded by: Hon. Ellen V. Christo

New Hampshire Circuit Court Deputy Administrative Judge
- In office July 2011 – 2017-2018
- Preceded by: None
- Succeeded by: Hon. Susan W. Ashley

Personal details
- Born: 1959 (age 66–67)

David D. King was the former Administrative Judge of the New Hampshire Circuit Court. He retired from the position of Administrative Judge on July 1, 2024 and continues to serve as a Senior Active Status Judge.

== Early life and education ==
King is a 1981 graduate of Plymouth State College and received his J.D. from the Franklin Pierce Law Center (now UNH School of Law) in 1984.

== Legal career ==
King was a member of the New Hampshire House of Representatives and in 1984 was a delegate to the state's 17th Constitutional Convention. In 1985, he was hired by attorney Philip Waystack, and later became a partner in the firm of Waystack & King in Colebrook, New Hampshire. In 1990, he was appointed as the presiding judge in the Coos County Probate Court. In 2007, he left Waystack & King to become a full-time judge. He then served as the deputy administrative judge of the New Hampshire Circuit Court since it began operations in July 2011. After the departure of former administrative judge Edwin W. Kelly, he became the administrative judge of the New Hampshire Circuit Court.

== Awards and community service ==
In 2021, King received the Innovator of the Year Award from the National Council of Juvenile and Family Court Judges (NCJFCJ).

In 2024, King received the Justice William A. Grimes Award for Judicial Professionalism from the New Hampshire Bar Association.

== Notable cases ==
In 2019, Judge King ruled that the New Hampshire Circuit Court - Probate division lack primary jurisdiction over the estate of John C. Chakalos. The original lawsuit was filed by Nathan Carman’s aunts, who argued that Carman should be barred by New Hampshire’s “slayer” statute for inheriting any portion of Chakalos’s multimillion dollar estate. Nathan Carman was accused of killing his grandfather, John C. Chakalos in 2013 and then killing his mother in 2016 in an attempt to inherit millions of dollars.
