= David I =

David I may refer to:

- David I, Caucasian Albanian Catholicos c. 399
- David I of Armenia, Catholicos of Armenia (728–741)
- David I Kuropalates of Georgia (died 881)
- David I Anhoghin, king of Lori (ruled 989–1048)
- David I of Scotland (died 1153)
- David I Strathbogie, Earl of Atholl (died 1270)
- David I of Imereti, King in 1259–1293
- Dawit I of Ethiopia (died 1413)
- David I of Kakheti, King of Kakheti (1601–1602)
