= Dave King (footballer, born 1962) =

English footballer

Personal information
- Full name: David Martin King
- Date of birth: 18 September 1962 (age 64)
- Place of birth: Colchester, Essex, England
- Height: 5 ft 9 in (1.75 m)
- Position: Midfielder

Youth career
- –1980: Derby County

Senior career*
Years	Team	Apps	(Gls)
1980–????	Derby County	0	(0)
- Napier City Rovers
- Gresley Rovers
1983	York City	1	(0)
- Gresley Rovers
Total		1	(0)
- * Club domestic league appearances and goals

David Martin King (born 18 September 1962) is an English former professional footballer who played as a midfielder in the Football League for York City, in non-League football for Gresley Rovers, in New Zealand for Napier City Rovers, and was on the books of Derby County without making a league appearance.
