= David II of Armenia =

David II of Armenia was Catholicos of All Armenians from 806 to 833.

He came from the village of Gagagh in the province of Maghaz.
