= New Hampshire Probate Court =

Probate court in the United States

New Hampshire Probate Court in the U.S. state of New Hampshire, is the court which has jurisdiction over trusts, wills, and estates, adoptions, termination of parental rights, name changes, guardianship of incapacitated persons, guardianship of minors, partition of property and involuntary admissions. Each of the ten counties has a probate court. Full-time judges assigned to Belknap, Hillsborough, Merrimack, Rockingham and Strafford counties, with the remaining counties having part-time judges.

== Jurisdiction ==
=== Exclusive jurisdiction ===
The Probate Court has exclusive jurisdiction over:

- The probate of wills.
- The granting of administration regarding the composition, administration, sale, settlement, and final distribution of estates of deceased persons and those presumed dead.
- The assignment of homestead and claims against the executor or administrator for those services related to the prior care and maintenance of the decedent and the administration of insolvent estates and appeals from said estates.
- The interpretation and construction of wills and the interpretation, construction, modification, and termination of trusts as that term is defined in [RSA 564-A:1, I].
- The appointment, removal, surcharge and administration of trustees of trusts.
- The appointment and removal of conservators, and of the guardians of minors, mentally incompetent persons and spendthrifts, and in relation to the duties imposed by law on such conservators and guardians, and the management and disposition of the estates of their wards.
- The adoption of children.
- The change of names of persons who reside in the county and who apply therefor.
- The termination of parental rights.
- Durable powers of attorney for health care under RSA 137-J.
- The interpretation and effect of living wills under RSA 137-H.
- Petitions for partition pursuant to RSA 547-C.
- Petitions to quiet title of real estate pursuant to RSA 547:11-c.
- Declaratory judgment actions pursuant to RSA 547:11-b.

=== Concurrent jurisdiction ===
The probate court has concurrent jurisdiction with the Superior Court over the following:

- Cases involving charitable uses and trusts, other than express trusts, as that term is defined in RSA 564-A:1, I.
- Durable powers of attorney under RSA 506:6 and 506:7.
- Waivers for marriage of minors pursuant to RSA 457:6–457:7.

== Organization ==
New Hampshire has eleven Probate Courts, with one in each county. Full-time judges assigned to Belknap, Hillsborough, Merrimack, Rockingham and Strafford County. Part-time judges are assigned to Carroll, Cheshire, Coos, Grafton and Sullivan County.

== See also ==
- List of New Hampshire state courts by town
