= New Hampshire Superior Court =

Coordinates: 42°56′4.0″N 72°16′46.5″W

The New Hampshire Superior Court is the statewide court of general jurisdiction which provides jury trials in civil and criminal cases. There are 11 locations of the Superior Court, one for each county and two in Hillsborough County.

== Jurisdiction ==
The Superior Court has jurisdiction in the following matters:

- Negligence, contracts, real property rights and other civil matters with a minimum claim of $1,500 in damages in which either party requests a trial by jury. The Superior Court has exclusive jurisdiction over cases in which the damage claims exceed $25,000.
- Divorce, child custody and support and domestic violence. The Superior Court and the District Court share jurisdiction over domestic violence cases.
- Felonies (major crimes such as drugs, burglary, theft and aggravated felonious sexual assault).
- Misdemeanor appeals from the District Court.
- The Superior Court also has exclusive jurisdiction over petitions for injunctive relief, in which parties seek a court order to block action, such as appeals from zoning and planning board decisions, disputes over title to real estate and petitions to enforce contracts.
- All other cases which are not the jurisdiction of the other courts.

The Superior Court has a specialized business and commercial court program, the Business and Commercial Dispute Docket (BCD). Parties must consent to the BCD's jurisdiction, and the BCD's specialized jurisdiction is limited further to listed case types of a business or commercial nature, with a more than $50,000 amount in controversy at issue. BCD cases are subject to a court annexed mediation program. The program's first judge, Richard B. McNamara, served this business court docket for 11 years.

In Grafton, Rockingham and Sullivan Counties, the Family Division has jurisdiction over divorce, custody/support and domestic violence cases.

== Organization ==
The Superior Court has one Chief Justice of the Superior Court and up to 28 associate justices. Currently, 26 justices sitting in 11 locations in the 10 counties. All counties have one courthouse except for Hillsborough County which has two. Each court is known by the county which it is located. For example: the superior court located in Rockingham County is known as the "Rockingham Superior Court." The two Hillsborough superior courts are known as "Hillsborough Superior Court North" (located in Manchester) and "Hillsborough Superior Court South" (located in Nashua).

The Superior Court is headed by the Chief Justice of the Superior Court which is responsible for the administration of the court. The chief justice also recommends marital masters to be nominated and appointed by the governor and council.

=== Appointment ===
Part II, Article 46 of the state constitution, states all judicial officers shall be nominated and appointed by the Governor and Executive Council. It also states that such nominations shall be made at least three days prior to such appointment and no such appointment shall take place unless a majority of the council agrees.

=== Length of tenure ===
All judicial officers hold their offices during "good behavior," according to Part II, Article 73 of the state constitution. Part II Article 78 of the state constitution requires Judges retire at the age of seventy years. Under RSA 491:1, the Chief Justice is appointed to a five-year term and is not prohibited from being reappointed to another term.

=== Salary ===
The salaries of the Superior Court justices and other state judges are set by RSA 491-A:1. The Chief Justice of the Superior Court makes $175,837 annually, and associate justices make $164,911 annually.

== History ==
In April 1901, the Superior Court was established by the General Court when two courts were organized to take the place of the Supreme Court as it then existed. The Supreme Court was given jurisdiction over "law terms," or questions of law heard on appeal. The Superior Court was given jurisdiction over trials. Having the two courts, allowed a trial court's ruling to be heard by a separate court of appeals of which the trial court judge was not a member.

== Lists ==
- State courts by cities, towns, and unincorporated places
