= New Hampshire Circuit Court Family Division =

New Hampshire Judicial Branch Family Division (simply Family Division) operates ten courts in three counties in the U.S. state of New Hampshire that deal with matters affecting families. The Family Division has courts in Grafton, Rockingham and Sullivan counties which have jurisdiction to hear cases involving cases divorce, parenting disputes, child support, domestic violence, guardianships, termination of parental rights, abuse and neglect cases, children in need of supervision, delinquencies, and some adoptions.

== Lists ==
- State courts by cities, towns, and unincorporated places
