= New Hampshire Circuit Court District Division =

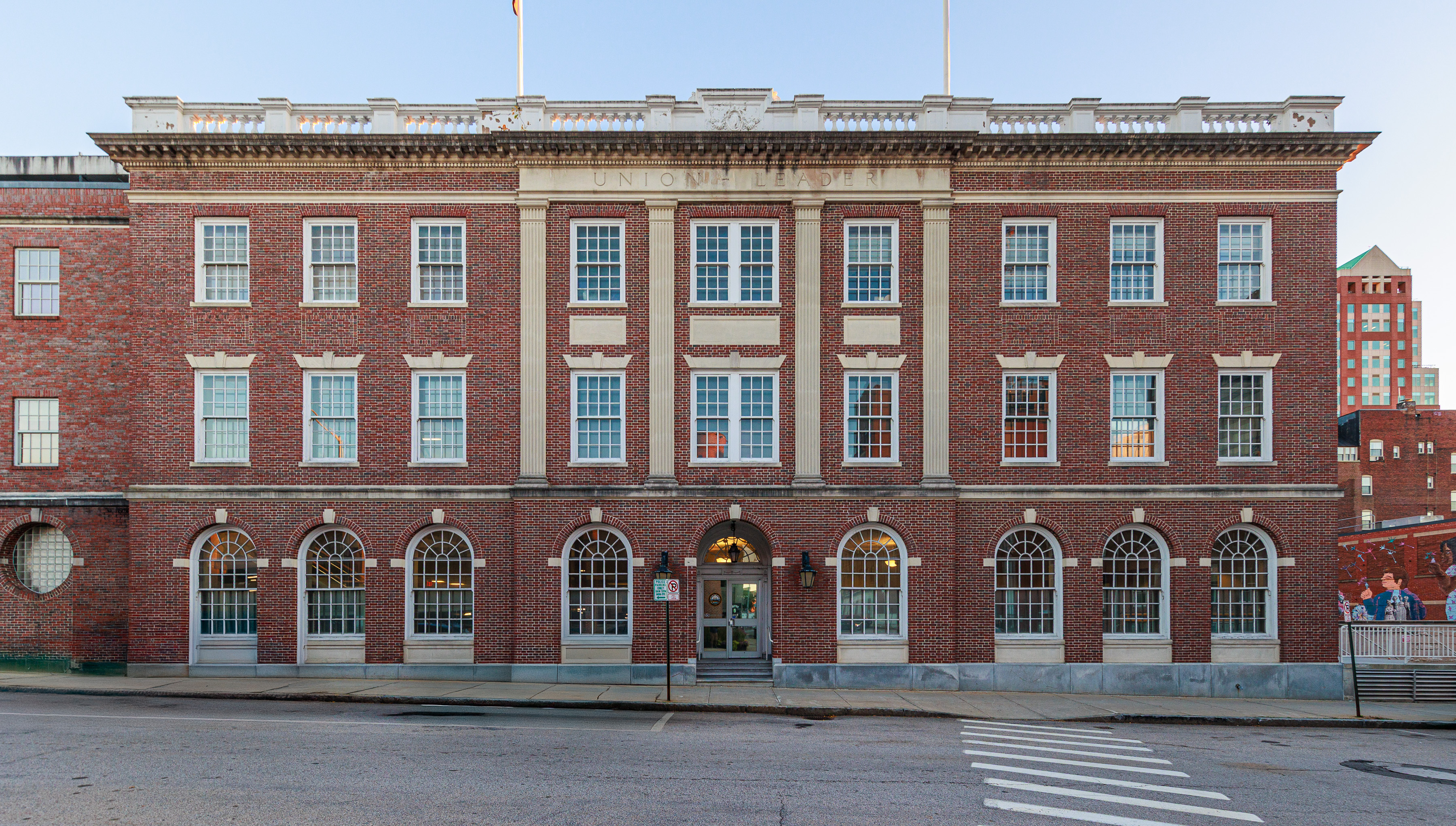
New Hampshire 9th Circuit, commonly known as the Manchester District Court, is located in the former Union Leader building on Amherst Street.

The New Hampshire Circuit Court District Division is the "community court" of the U.S. state of New Hampshire, made up of one circuit for each County and is located in 36 cities and towns. The District Division has jurisdiction over all juvenile matters, domestic violence cases, violation and misdemeanor level offenses, small claims, landlord-tenant issues and other civil cases. Upon the creation of the District Court in 1963, the state Municipal Courts were effectively abolished. On July 1, 2011, the New Hampshire Circuit Court was created and consolidated the District Courts with the Probate Court and Family Division.

== Jurisdiction ==
The District Division has jurisdiction in the following matters:

- Misdemeanor and criminal offenses
- Civil cases in which the damages claimed, excluding real estate titles, not exceeding $1,500
- The court shares jurisdiction with the Superior Court over civil actions for damages in which the damages claimed, excluding real estate titles, do not exceed $25,000 (this ceiling can be increased to $50,000 as permitted by the state Supreme Court).
- The court shares jurisdiction over domestic violence cases with the Superior Court.

== Organization ==
The District Division has 36 courts located in 34 districts. The locations of the court were devised by the legislature so that each District Court would be within 20 miles of the inhabitants of each district. The District Division has 19 full-time judges and 50 part-time judges.

=== Appointment ===
Part II, Article 46 of the state constitution, states all judicial officers shall be nominated and appointed by the Governor and Executive Council. It also states that such nominations shall be made at least three days prior to such appointment and no such appointment shall take place unless a majority of the council agrees.

=== Length of tenure ===
All judicial officers hold their offices during "good behavior," according to Part II, Article 73 of the state constitution. Part II Article 78 of the state constitution requires Judges retire at the age of seventy years.

=== Salary ===
The salaries of the District Division judges and other state judges are set by the General Court. In the District Court salaries are weighted based on the caseload of the court from the previous year. Associate judges also receive a weighted salary, but can make no more than 70% of a District Division judge.

== History ==
In 1963, district courts were created by the legislature to replace the existing municipal courts. RSA 502-A:35, effective July 1, 1964, abolished all Municipal Courts, unless cities and towns voted by ballot to "continue to maintain its existing municipal court so long as its present judge remains in office." The law required that once there was a vacancy on the Municipal Court judge, it could not be filled and that court would be abolished and its jurisdiction transferred to the appropriate District Court.

== See also ==
- List of New Hampshire state courts by town
