= New Hampshire Women's Bar Association =

Association of lawyers

- Formation: May 1998
- Type: Legal society
- Headquarters: Manchester, New Hampshire
- Location: United States
- President: Caroline Leonard
- Website: www.nhwba.org

The New Hampshire Women's Bar Association (NHWBA), founded in May of 1998, is a voluntary bar association for attorneys, judges, educators, government officials, and law students in the state of New Hampshire.

== History ==
Following a presentation titled "Why Have a Statewide Women's Bar Association in New Hampshire?", given by a member of the Women's Bar Association of Massachusetts, there was a consensus to incorporate New Hampshire's first statewide women's bar association. On October 1, 1998, the NHWBA held its inaugural fall reception in Concord, New Hampshire. In its first year, NHWBA gained over 200 members. An annual fall reception has been held in Concord every October since.

In celebration of its 20th anniversary, the NHWBA launched their SHERO campaign, honoring prominent and influential female attorneys and educators throughout the state.

== Activities ==
The NHWBA currently has five committees: Membership, Networking, Programming, Public Relations, and Public Service. In addition, the NHWBA sometimes publicly advocates for certain policy provisions that affect the legal profession and the interests of women and families. The NHWBA also hosts Continuing Legal Education classes, runs community service programs and food drives, and facilitates networking and mentoring programs.

== Women to Women Project ==
The New Hampshire Department of Corrections and the NHWBA worked together to create the "Women to Women Project" which matches New Hampshire attorneys with current inmates at the New Hampshire State Prison for Women. The program allows inmates to receive limited legal advice from licensed attorneys. The NHWBA Public Service Committee facilitates bi-monthly information sessions on different areas of the law for inmates at the prison.

== Awards ==
Every year, the NHWBA presents two awards at their fall reception. The first is the Marilla M. Ricker Achievement Award, honoring the first female lawyer from New Hampshire. The Ricker Award is presented to an attorney who has "achieved professional excellence, and paved the way to success for other women lawyers, or advanced opportunities for women in the legal profession, and/or performed exemplary public service on behalf of women." Past recipients include Representative Annie Kuster and former New Hampshire Supreme Court Justices Carol Ann Conboy and Linda Dalianis. The second award is the Winnie MacLaughlin Scholarship, which is presented annually to a second-year law student from the University of New Hampshire Franklin Pierce School of Law who exemplifies academic excellence and has completed community service focusing on advancing women in society.

== See also ==
- New Hampshire Bar Association
- List of first women lawyers and judges in New Hampshire
