= Gordon J. MacDonald =

American judge (born 1961)

Gordon MacDonald

37th Chief Justice of the New Hampshire Supreme Court
- In office March 4, 2021 – September 15, 2026
- Appointed by: Chris Sununu
- Preceded by: Gary Hicks
- Succeeded by: Patrick E. Donovan

30th Attorney General of New Hampshire
- In office April 13, 2017 – March 4, 2021; On leave: January 8, 2021 – March 4, 2021
- Governor: Chris Sununu
- Preceded by: Joseph Foster
- Succeeded by: Jane Young (acting)

Personal details
- Born: November 27, 1961 (age 64) Los Angeles, California, U.S.
- Party: Republican
- Education: Dartmouth College (BA); Cornell University (JD)

Gordon J. MacDonald (born November 27, 1961) is an American attorney who served as the chief justice of the New Hampshire Supreme Court from 2021 to 2026. He previously served as the 30th attorney general of New Hampshire from 2017 to 2021.

MacDonald began a medical leave of absence on July 24, 2026, and resigned on September 15, 2026.

== Early life, education, and career ==
MacDonald was born in 1961 in Los Angeles, California to Marcelline (Kuglen) MacDonald and Gordon J. F. MacDonald, a geophysicist and environmental scientist.

MacDonald attended public schools in Hanover, New Hampshire, graduating from Hanover High School. He earned a Bachelor of Arts in government, cum laude, from Dartmouth College in 1983.

From 1985 to 1990, MacDonald worked as legislative director for United States Senator Gordon J. Humphrey. In 1990, he became Humphrey’s Chief of Staff.

== Legal career ==
In 1994, MacDonald earned a juris doctor, magna cum laude, from Cornell Law School. At Cornell, he worked as an article editor for the Cornell Law Review and was a member of the Order of the Coif.

From 1994 to 1995, MacDonald clerked for judge Norman H. Stahl of the United States Court of Appeals for the First Circuit.

In 1995, MacDonald became an associate in the litigation department of Hale and Dorr LLP in Boston. In 1997, he became an associate at Nelson, Kinder, Mosseau & Gordon, PC in Manchester, New Hampshire. In 2001, he became an associate in the litigation department of Nixon Peabody, also in Manchester. In 2005, he became a partner in the same department of Nixon Peabody, holding that role until his appointment as attorney general.

From 2004 to 2017, MacDonald served on the New Hampshire Supreme Court Board of Bar Examiners, chairing the board from 2010 to 2017.

In 2017, MacDonald was nominated to be attorney general of New Hampshire by newly elected governor Chris Sununu. He was unanimously confirmed by the Executive Council of New Hampshire.

== New Hampshire Supreme Court ==
On June 4, 2019, Governor Sununu nominated MacDonald to be Chief Justice of the New Hampshire Supreme Court, replacing Robert J. Lynn who had reached the mandatory retirement at age 70. On July 10, 2019, the Democratic-controlled executive council rejected MacDonald’s nomination by a 3-2 party-line vote. Democratic Councilors accused him of being a partisan and radical conservative. MacDonald denied the accusations, pointing to the support for his nomination from prominent Democrats including former Chief Justice John T. Broderick.

On January 22, 2021, after Republicans flipped the council in the 2020 elections, Sununu renominated MacDonald, and his nomination was confirmed by a 4–1 party-line vote. He was sworn into office on March 4, 2021, succeeding acting Chief Justice Gary E. Hicks.

On July 24, 2026, MacDonald began a sudden medical leave of absence. MacDonald announced his resignation, effective immediately, on September 15, 2026.

Legal offices
Preceded by Joseph Foster	Attorney General of New Hampshire; 2017–2021	Succeeded by Jane Young; Acting
Preceded by Gary Hicks; Acting	Chief Justice of the New Hampshire Supreme Court; 2021–2026	Succeeded by Patrick E. Donovan; Acting
Incumbent
