= List of first women lawyers and judges in New Hampshire =

This is a list of the first women lawyer(s) and judge(s) in New Hampshire. It includes the year in which the women were admitted to practice law (in parentheses). Also included are women who achieved other distinctions such becoming the first in their state to graduate from law school or become a political figure.

== Firsts in New Hampshire's history ==
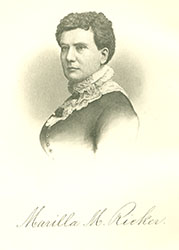
Marilla Ricker: First female lawyer in New Hampshire (1890)

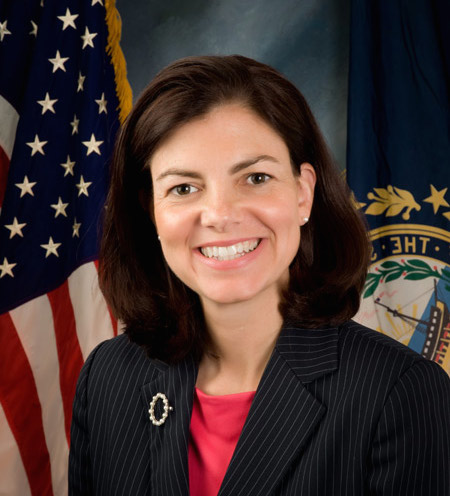
Kelly Ayotte: First female Attorney General of New Hampshire (2004)

=== Lawyers ===
- First female: Marilla Ricker (1890)
- First female litigator: Laura J. Kahn (1968)

=== State judges ===
- First female (municipal court): Idella Jenness in 1935
- First female: Jean K. Burling (1973) in 1979
- First female (superior court): Linda S. Dalianis (1970) in 1980
- First female (Supreme Court of New Hampshire): Linda S. Dalianis (1970) in 2000
- First female (Chief Justice; Supreme Court of New Hampshire): Linda S. Dalianis (1970) in 2010
- First Black female: Talesha Saint-Marc (2009) in 2023

=== Federal judges ===
- First female (U.S. District Court for the District of New Hampshire): Landya B. McCafferty (1991) in 2013
- First Black (female) (magistrate) (U.S. District Court for the District of New Hampshire): Talesha Saint-Marc (2009) in 2023
- Kimberly Bacher: First female to serve as the Chief Judge of the U.S. Bankruptcy Court for the District of New Hampshire (2024)

=== Attorney General of New Hampshire ===
- First female law clerk: Jennie Blanche Newhall (1920)
- First female: Kelly Ayotte (1993) from 2004-2009

=== Deputy Attorney General of New Hampshire ===
- First female: Deborah Jones Cooper in 1981

=== United States Attorney ===
- First female: Emily Gray Rice (1984) in 2016

=== Bar associations ===
- First female admitted (New Hampshire Bar Association): Agnes Winifred "Winnie" McLaughlin (1917)
- First female presidents (New Hampshire Bar Association): Patti Blanchette and Susan B. Carbon from 1992-1993 and 1993-1994 respectively
- First female president (New Hampshire Women's Bar Association): Maureen Raiche Manning in 1998

== First 100 women admitted to practice law in New Hampshire ==
1. Agnes Winifred McLaughlin
2. Jennie Blanche Newhall
3. Margaret Sheehan Blodgett
4. Charlotte Helen George
5. Sara T. Knox
6. Esther Gottesfeld Lublin
7. Miriam G. Rosenblum
8. Pauline Swain Merrill
9. Harriet E. Mansfield
10. Paula Ladday
11. Florence T. Cavanaugh
12. Nina N. Frankman
13. Marguerita M. Hurley
14. Evelyn C. Earley
15. Emily Marx
16. Beatrice F. Little
17. Beryle M. Aldrich
18. Mary Alice Fountain
19. Celia D.R. Novins
20. Evangeline V. Tallman
21. Doris Louise Bennett
22. Mary E. Perkins
23. Pauline B. Barnard
24. Mabelle Fellows Murphy
25. Leila L. Maynard
26. Ida V. C. Milligan
27. Ruth I. Moses
28. Margaret Quill Flynn
29. Lucille Kozlowski
30. Irma A. Matthews
31. Catharine B. Sage
32. Anne M. Howorth
33. Rachel Hallett Johnson
34. Caroline R. Grey
35. Constance M. Mehegan
36. Winnifred M. Moran
37. Constance J. Betley
38. Helen White
39. Judith Dunlop Ransmeier
40. Mary Susan Stein Leahy
41. Laura Jane Kahn
42. Martha Margaret Davis
43. Eleanor S. Krasnow
44. Susan B. Monson
45. Julia N. Nelson
46. Dorothy R. Sullivan
47. Jean K. Burling
48. Donna W. Economou
49. Alexandra T. Breed
50. Linda Stewart Dalianis
51. Claudia Cords Damon
52. Georgia C. Griffin
53. Barbara Sard
54. Bruce Earman Viles
55. Joyce Ann Wilder
56. Joan L. Carroll
57. Anne Swift Almy
58. Sharon Ann Coughlin
59. Anne M. Goggin
60. J. Campbell Harvey
61. Judith Miller Kasper
62. Patricia McKee
63. Ellen J. Musinsky
64. Brenda T. Piampiano
65. Janina Stodolski
66. Elizabeth B. Sullivan
67. Priscilla B. Fox
68. Micki B. Stiller
69. Mae C. Bradshaw
70. Anne Cagwin Hagstrom
71. Deborah J. Cooper
72. Lynne M. Dennis
73. Nancy E. Ebb
74. Abigail Elias
75. Alice S. Love
76. Stephanie T. Nute
77. Elaine R. Warshell
78. Catherine Ravinski
79. Carolyn W. Baldwin
80. Dorothy Bickford-Desmond
81. Charlotte Crane
82. Pamela D. Kelly
83. Janine Gawryl
84. Cathy J. Green
85. Jody D. Handy
86. Dona L. Heller
87. Carolyn H. Henneman
88. Constance G. Jackson
89. Barbara R. Keshen
90. Karin Kramer
91. Jane R. Lawrence
92. Ellen L. Arnold
93. Lizbeth Lyons
94. Elizabeth Marean Mueller
95. Marilyn Billings McNamara
96. Margaret B. Morin
97. Nancy V. Sisemoore
98. Susan Vercillo Duprey
99. Lanea A. Witkus
100. Nancy O. Dodge

== Firsts in local history ==
- Martha Crocker: First female lawyer in Cheshire County, New Hampshire

== See also ==
- List of first women lawyers and judges in the United States
- Timeline of women lawyers in the United States
- Women in law

== Other topics of interest ==
- List of first minority male lawyers and judges in the United States
- List of first minority male lawyers and judges in New Hampshire
