= Dalianis =

Dalianis or Daliani is a surname. Notable people with the surname include:

- Hatzimichalis Dalianis
- Mando Dalianis
- Linda Dalianis
- Aggeliki Daliani
