= David A. Brock =

American judge (born 1936)

David Allen Brock (born July 6, 1936) was a New Hampshire lawyer who served as the chief justice of the New Hampshire Supreme Court from 1986 to 2004.

== Biography ==
Born in Stoneham, Massachusetts, Brock graduated from Dartmouth College in 1958 and obtained his law degree from the University of Michigan Law School in 1963. In 1969, President Richard Nixon appointed Brock as United States Attorney for the District of New Hampshire. He thereafter served as a judge of the state superior court, and was named as a potential nominee to the state supreme court in 1978.

In 1986, he was appointed chief justice of the New Hampshire Supreme Court by Governor John H. Sununu. During his time as the chief justice, Brock's efforts to modernize and unify the courts were credited with providing a more efficient and effective judicial system in New Hampshire.

== Legacy ==
Brock's legacy is complicated and intertwined with many facets. In the year 2000, the New Hampshire House of Representatives took the step of impeaching him on four separate counts. These counts included maladministration, malpractice, and knowingly lying under oath. He was later acquitted by the Senate on a vote of seven to convict and fifteen for acquittal, with two-thirds of the twenty-four members needed for conviction.

Brock retired on December 31, 2004, after serving as the chief justice of the New Hampshire Supreme Court for 18 years.

== See also ==
- Impeachment in New Hampshire

Political offices
Preceded by Edward John Lampron	Justice of the New Hampshire Supreme Court; 1978–1986	Succeeded by W. Stephen Thayer III
Preceded by John W. King	Chief Justice of the New Hampshire Supreme Court; 1986–2004	Succeeded by John T. Broderick Jr.
