= William F. Batchelder =

American judge (1926–2019)

William Foster Batchelder (October 15, 1926 – May 7, 2019) was a justice of the New Hampshire Supreme Court from 1981 to 1995.

Born in Holderness, New Hampshire, Batchelder graduated from Plymouth Regional High School in 1944, having already enrolled at the University of New Hampshire and completed some classes there. He suspended his educational efforts to enlist in the United States Navy during World War II, entering service in October 1944.

After the war, Batchelder received a Bachelor's degree from the University of New Hampshire in 1949, and a law degree from Boston University School of Law in 1952. He then entered private practice. He was appointed to the New Hampshire Superior Court by Governor Walter Peterson in 1970, and then elevated to the state supreme court by Governor Hugh Gallen in 1981. Batchelder retired from the court in 1995, returning by designation from time to time to fill in for recused judges. He died peacefully at his home in Plymouth, New Hampshire on May 7, 2019.

Batchelder's eldest child, United States Navy Lieutenant Stephen H. Batchelder, died in an aircraft crash onboard the USS Nimitz in the Central Mediterranean on January 25, 1987.

== Legacy and honors ==
- The Daniel Webster/William Batchelder Inn of Court, a chartered member of the American Inns of Court, is named partly in Batchelder's honor.
- The William F. Batchelder Justice Fund, established by the New Hampshire Bar Association, supports legal assistance for low-income and disadvantaged people in New Hampshire.

Political offices
Preceded by John W. King	Justice of the New Hampshire Supreme Court; 1981–1995	Succeeded by John T. Broderick Jr.
