= United States v. Anderson (2024) =

2024 U.S. federal criminal case involving threats against presidential candidates

United States v. Anderson was a federal criminal case in the United States District Court for the District of New Hampshire in which Tyler P. Anderson, a 30-year-old resident of Dover, New Hampshire, was charged with three counts of transmitting interstate threats after sending violent text messages to the presidential campaigns of Vivek Ramaswamy, Nikki Haley, and Chris Christie during the 2024 Republican presidential primary season. The case ended without a verdict when Anderson was found dead in a Concord parking garage on June 26, 2024, during jury deliberations, in an apparent suicide.

== Background ==
During the 2024 Republican presidential primary, New Hampshire was an early primary state and received heavy campaign activity, including automated text message outreach from candidates' campaigns. Anderson, who had no prior criminal record, had received at least 30 unsolicited campaign text messages from three different presidential campaigns between July 2022 and December 2023. Anderson was receiving mental health treatment and was on prescribed medications at the time of the events.

== Threats ==
Between November 22 and December 8, 2023, Anderson sent threatening text messages in response to automated campaign messages from three Republican presidential campaigns:

On November 22, 2023, Anderson sent messages to Nikki Haley's campaign threatening to "impale" and "disembowel" the candidate.

On December 6, 2023, Anderson responded to a campaign message from Chris Christie's campaign — which promoted an event described as one where a candidate "isn't afraid to tell it like it is," consistent with Christie's "Tell it Like It Is Town Halls" — with messages threatening to shoot the candidate and carry out a "mass shooting" at a campaign event.

On December 8, 2023, Anderson received an automated text from Vivek Ramaswamy's campaign promoting a breakfast event at the Roundabout Diner in Portsmouth, New Hampshire, scheduled for December 11. Anderson replied with two messages: one stating he would shoot the candidate, and another threatening to kill all event attendees.

== Investigation and arrest ==
The Ramaswamy campaign reported the threats to the Portsmouth Police Department, which referred the matter to the Federal Bureau of Investigation. Investigators used Verizon Wireless records to trace the messages to Anderson's phone and obtained a search warrant for his residence in Dover. FBI agents seized Anderson's phone and firearms found in the home. The threatening texts were discovered in a deleted folder on his phone, along with additional threats sent to other campaigns.

Anderson was arrested on December 9, 2023, by the FBI, with assistance from the Dover and Portsmouth police departments. In Anderson's own account, he stated he was alone in his bedroom when at least six law enforcement officers entered his residence with guns drawn. He reported asking for a lawyer before his interrogation, but said agents did not respond to his request.

== Charges and proceedings ==
=== Initial charge ===
Anderson was initially charged on December 9, 2023, with one count of transmitting in interstate commerce a threat to injure the person of another, related to the Ramaswamy threats, which carries penalties of up to 5 years in federal prison, up to 3 years of supervised release, and a fine of up to $250,000. He made his initial appearance in federal court in Concord on December 11, 2023. The case was initially prosecuted by Assistant U.S. Attorneys Jarad Hodes and Matthew Hunter, under United States Attorney Jane E. Young of the District of New Hampshire.

=== Release conditions ===
On December 14, 2023, U.S. District Judge Samantha D. Elliott ordered Anderson released under conditions including: no contact with any presidential candidate or campaign, mandatory mental health treatment, continued use of prescribed medications, and removal of firearms from his home (the firearms belonged to a roommate). Both the prosecution and defense acknowledged that Anderson had no prior criminal record and had stated he had no actual intent to carry out the threats.

=== Grand jury indictment ===
On December 21, 2023, a grand jury returned a three-count indictment against Anderson, each count charging transmitting in interstate commerce a threat to injure the person of another, corresponding to the threats sent to the Haley, Christie, and Ramaswamy campaigns respectively. Each count carried a potential sentence of up to five years in federal prison, up to three years of supervised release, and a fine of up to $250,000. Assistant U.S. Attorney Charles L. Rombeau took over prosecution of the case.

Anderson pleaded not guilty to all three counts on December 28, 2023.

== Defense ==
Federal Public Defender Dorothy E. Graham represented Anderson and mounted a First Amendment defense, arguing that Anderson's messages did not constitute "true threats" and were protected speech.

Graham argued that because Anderson was responding to unsolicited, automated campaign messages, there was no certainty his replies would ever reach a human reader, undermining the mens rea required for a true threat. She characterized the language as "crude opposition" rather than genuine threats and filed a motion to dismiss the first count (the Haley charge) on these grounds. In her motion, Graham wrote that the messages indicated Anderson's desire for the campaigns to stop texting him, rather than any intent to carry out violence.

Graham also argued the prosecution had omitted qualifying language from the November 22 messages that would have provided important context.

== Trial and death ==
=== Trial ===
Anderson's trial began on June 24, 2024, in the U.S. District Court in Concord before Judge Samantha D. Elliott. On the evening of June 25, the jury foreperson informed the judge that the jury had reached a unanimous verdict on one count but was unable to reach consensus on the remaining charges. Deliberations were postponed on June 26.

=== Death ===
On the evening of June 26, 2024, the FBI issued a stop-and-hold request for Anderson after he failed to appear in court. Concord police located Anderson's vehicle — a Nissan Leaf — in the Concord Hospital Langley Park parking garage at approximately 8:30 p.m. Officers found Anderson in the vehicle and were unable to wake him. Upon observing what appeared to be a chemical agent inside the car, officers retreated and requested a hazmat team. Anderson's body was removed from the vehicle and he was pronounced dead at approximately 9:30 p.m.

Concord Police Deputy Chief John Thomas stated there were no signs of foul play and no weapons were found in the vehicle. The circumstances of Anderson's death — including the presence of harmful chemicals in a sealed vehicle — were consistent with suicide.

=== Case dismissal ===
On June 27, 2024, Assistant U.S. Attorneys Charles L. Rombeau and Matthew Vicinanzo filed a motion to dismiss the indictment, stating that "the government has learned that the defendant is deceased." The case was closed without a verdict being entered.

== Mental health ==
Anderson's mental health was a recurring element throughout the case. At the time of his arrest, both the prosecution and defense acknowledged he was receiving mental health treatment and was on prescribed medications. His release conditions specifically required continued treatment and medication compliance. Anderson had no prior criminal record, and both sides acknowledged he had expressed no genuine intent to carry out the threats. His death during trial, under circumstances indicative of suicide, raised questions about the psychological toll of the federal prosecution on a defendant with known mental health challenges.

== Significance ==
The case occurred during a period of heightened concern about threats against public officials in the United States. Attorney General Merrick Garland issued a statement in connection with Anderson's indictment, noting a rise in threats of violence against those seeking public office and stating that such threats undermine democratic processes. U.S. Attorney Jane Young stated there was "zero tolerance" for federal crimes committed in New Hampshire.

The defense's First Amendment arguments regarding unsolicited campaign text messages and the threshold for true threats in the context of automated political communications raised novel legal questions about the boundaries of protected speech in the digital campaign era.

== Key personnel ==
- Prosecution: Assistant U.S. Attorney Charles L. Rombeau (lead at trial), under U.S. Attorney Jane E. Young, District of New Hampshire. Assistant U.S. Attorneys Jarad Hodes and Matthew Hunter handled the initial complaint; Matthew Vicinanzo co-signed the dismissal motion.
- Defense: Federal Public Defender Dorothy E. Graham
- Judge: U.S. District Judge Samantha D. Elliott
- Lead investigative agency: Federal Bureau of Investigation, with assistance from the Dover and Portsmouth police departments

== See also ==
- True threat
- First Amendment to the United States Constitution
- 2024 Republican Party presidential primaries
