= Gary Hicks =

Gary Hicks may refer to:

- Gary E. Hicks (born 1953), American lawyer and judge in New Hampshire
- Gary Hicks (politician), member of the Tennessee House of Representatives
