= William D. McDill v. Environamics Corporation =

- Supreme Court of New Hampshire

Argued February 3, 2000 Decided February 3, 2000
- Full case name: William D. McDill v. Environamics Corporation
- Citation(s): Rockingham No. 97-894

Court membership
- Judge(s) sitting: Chief Justice David Brock, and Associate Justices W. Stephen Thayer III, Joseph P. Nadeau, Sherman D. Horton, and Linda Stewart Dalianis

William D. McDill v. Environamics Corporation, Rockingham No. 97-894 (2000), was a New Hampshire Supreme Court decision reversing a decision where a jury awarded $65,000 to plaintiff William D. McDill on his breach-of-contract claim against his former employer, Environamics Corporation. The Court's ruling is significant for its discussion of at-will versus "for‑cause" termination and the time limits of discovery, including the treatment of after-acquired evidence.

== Background ==
McDill was an employee at Environamics beginning July 12, 1993, through a written contract saying that he could only be terminated "for cause". In 1994 and 1995, McDill's daughter, Kelly, was employed at the company during her breaks from school. Company policy discouraged hiring relatives, but that policy wasn't in writing. McDill claims that he was never informed of the hiring policy.

On January 10, 1995, McDill covertly copied a facsimile from the office fax machine. It was a job application intended for his position. After seeing this, McDill believed the company planned to terminate him. The copying of the facsimile was undisclosed to Environamics until the trial.

Upon learning McDill's daughter had started working for the company again, the company's president ordered her termination, and then fired McDill on February 13, 1995, citing insubordination and conflict of interest for employing his daughter in defiance of his express orders.

At the original trial, McDill said that his dismissal violated his contract because hiring his daughter did not constitute "for cause". He really focused on the fact that there was no written policy prohibiting hiring relatives and that he had not been formally told this policy. He also said that copying the fax should not be a factor in the case, since the company was unaware of it when he was fired.

Environamics said that McDill showed insubordination and was a breach of their trust, and that those were valid grounds for dismissal. The company argued that McDill's hiring of his daughter against direct instructions was undermining authority, plus secretly copying confidential documents was also an act of dishonesty that would warrant termination. Environamics said that the jury should have heard the testimony about how the company president would have responded if he had known of the fax incident, and that the after-acquired evidence doctrine applied to eliminate McDill’s damages claim.

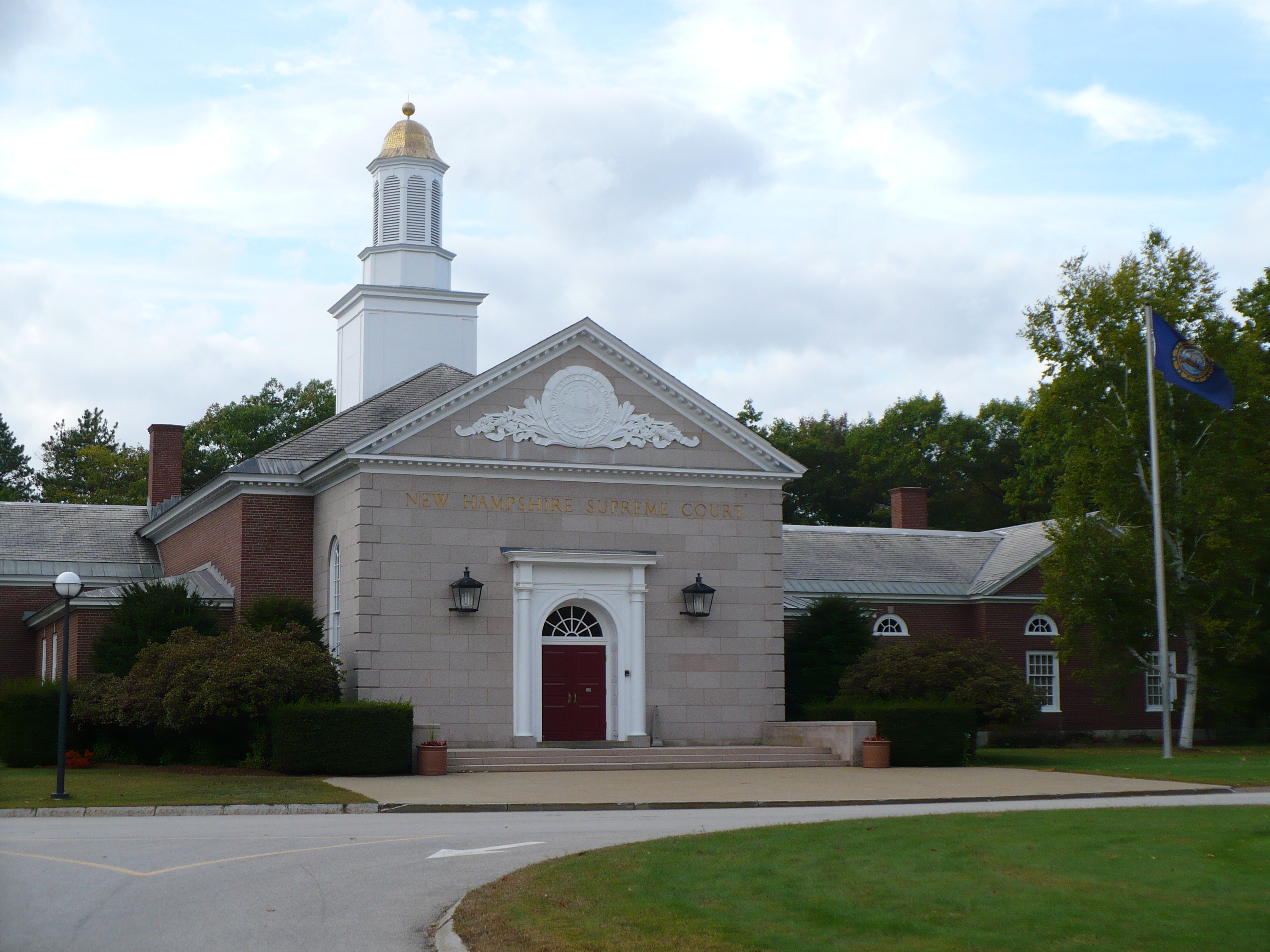
New Hampshire Supreme Court

== Court's analysis and rulings ==
The jury awarded McDill $65,000 for breach of contract, but on appeal, the New Hampshire Supreme Court, with a unanimous opinion authored by Justice Johnson, reversed the trial court's judgment in favor of McDill and ordered a new trial. The Court decided that copying the facsimile counted as a willful breach of trust and insubordination. They ruled that copying the facsimile was grounds that would have justified for-cause termination, which would work as after‑acquired evidence to show he wasn't wrongfully discharged from the company. Because of that, McDill was not entitled to the damages he was originally awarded.

The Court also talked about the scope of discovery and admissibility with after‑acquired evidence. McDill's misconduct was not discovered by Environamics until the trial. The Court ruled that after‑acquired evidence could bar recovery under contract law, even if it wasn't known before dismissal of the employee. The trial court also had made a mistake in excluding testimony from the president of the company about what his response would have been, and this error contributed to the decision to reverse the verdict.

The justices also talked about discovery issues, agreeing with the trial court that Environamics should have been more open about certain materials, like the job application for McDill's job, and that they should have been shared earlier in the trial. However, they found this was not more important than the legal significance of the undisclosed misconduct.

The Court issued no dissenting or concurring opinions, showing that it was a unified view among the justices. The ruling set a precedent in New Hampshire that after-acquired evidence can contribute to nullifying contractual job protections when the evidence reveals behavior that would have caused termination.

== Legal principles ==
A legal principle seen in this case is for-cause termination. Termination for cause is when an employee is dismissed for violating company policies, misconduct, or just general poor performance. This case shows that even with a contractual right to employment for cause, if there is serious misconduct occurring, even if the employee was unaware that it was misconduct, it can justify dismissal.

This case also addresses after‑acquired evidence. The Court recognized that if an employer discovers something that they were unaware of and is wrong, after firing an employee, it can remove or limit damages in breach‑of‑contract claims. In this case, the court ruled that copying a confidential document without permission, even if it was unknown at the time of termination, is sufficiently serious to justify firing for cause and denying damages.

Legal scholar Kerri Lynn Stone says that courts have inconsistently applied after-acquired evidence, oftentimes failing to balance employer interests with employee rights. In her article, she critiques decisions like McDill that allow post hoc justification for termination to defeat a valid contractual claim.

== Significance ==
The decision shows that New Hampshire applies after‑acquired evidence in breach‑of‑contract employment cases. This means that conduct that is unknown to an employer when they terminate an employee can prevent liability if that conduct would have justified termination under the contract. This influences discovery standards by reinforcing an employer's obligation to disclose information like job applicants and supporting materials, and clarifying how non‑produced evidence could be treated when in trial.
