= Wakefield Memorial High School =

Coordinates: 42°29′46.8″N 71°3′3.5″W

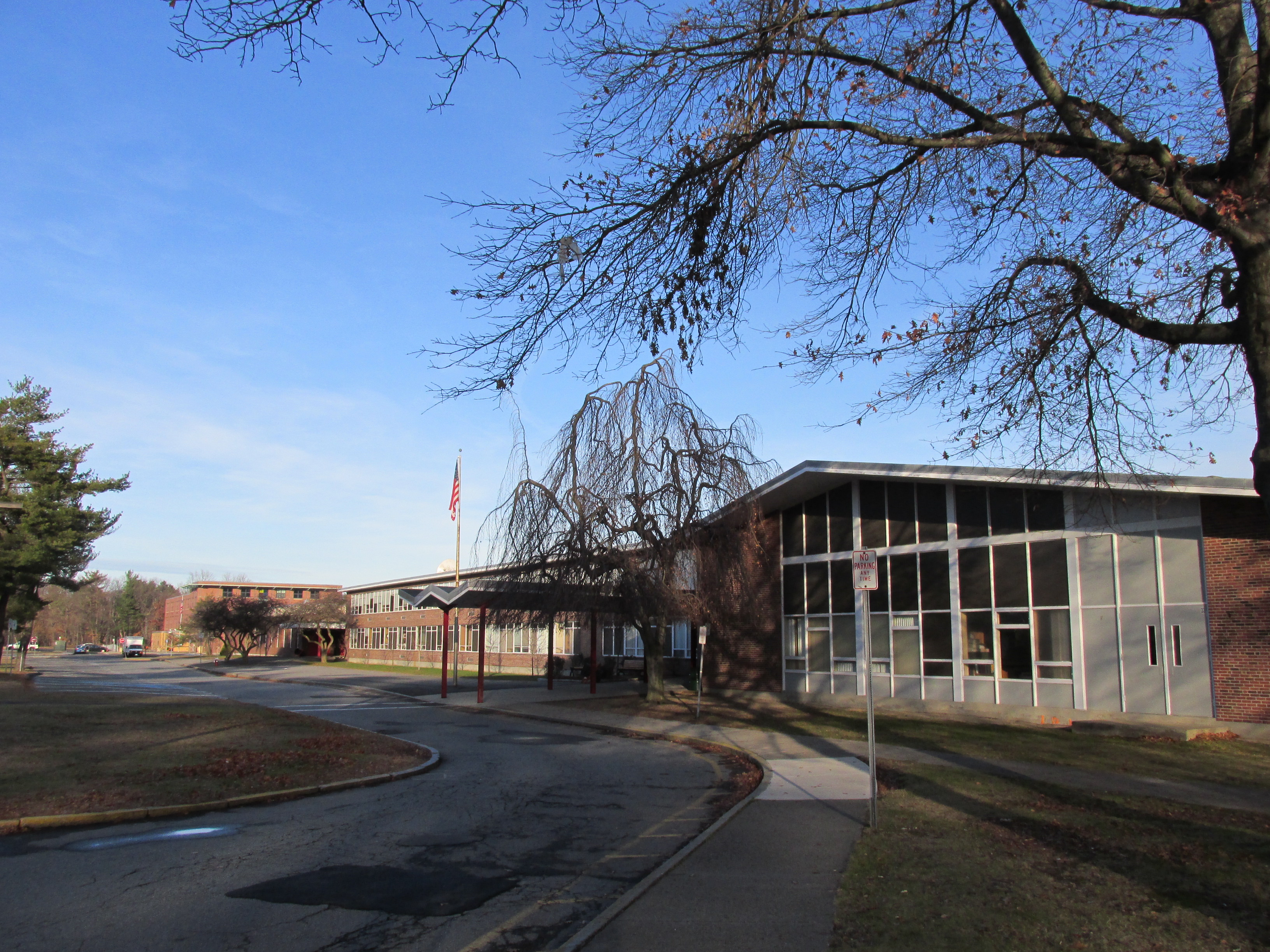
- Wakefield High School
- 60 Farm Street; Wakefield, Massachusetts; 01880; United States

Information
- Type: Public high school
- School district: Wakefield Public Schools
- Principal: Amy McLeod
- Staff: 81.1 (FTE)
- Grades: 9–12
- Enrollment: 854 (2024–2025)
- Student to teacher ratio: 10.1
- Colors: Red, white, and silver
- Rivals: Melrose High School
- Newspaper: Wakefield Express
- Website: www.wpsk12.org/schools/wakefield-memorial-high-school

Wakefield Memorial High School is a public school located in Wakefield, Massachusetts, United States.

As of the 2024–2025 school year, the school had an enrollment of 854 students and 81.3 classroom teachers (on an FTE basis), for a student-teacher ratio of 10.1:1

== Academics ==
The superintendent of Wakefield Public Schools is Douglas Lyons. Amy McLeod is the principal of WHS.

The 2008–2009 school year marked the first drastic scheduling change in over ten years as WMHS switched to a rotating, six-block daily schedule. Periods were condensed to 54 minutes in length. WMHS began offering Italian language classes for the 2008–2009 school year as well.

In 2008, WMHS was featured in Boston magazine for spending the least money per student of any public school in the state, landing it at number one in the "Most Bang for the Buck" category.

=== Advanced Placement course offerings ===
Sophomore, Junior, and Senior year: AP Music Theory, AP Computer Science Principles, AP Human Geography

Junior and Senior year: AP United States History, AP Modern World History, AP Statistics, AP Biology, AP Chemistry, AP Environmental Science, AP Computer Science, AP Music Theory, AP Language, AP Computer Science A, AP Physics 1

Senior year: AP Studio Art, AP United States Government and Politics, AP Literature, AP Calculus AB, AP Calculus BC, AP Spanish, AP French, AP Italian, AP Latin (Dual Enrollment), AP Physics C, AP Psychology, AP Government

== Athletics ==
Fall Sports: Football, Soccer, Cross Country, Swimming (Girls), Golf (Boys), Field Hockey (Girls), Volleyball (Girls), Dance, Cheerleading, Marching Band

Winter Sports: Indoor Track, Basketball, Hockey, Swimming (Northeast Vocational), Wrestling, Winter Percussion, Winterguard

Spring Sports: Outdoor Track, Baseball, Lacrosse, Boys' and Girls' Tennis, Softball

Under Head Coach Mike Boyages, the football team has achieved an overall record of 89–34–3 in his eleven years leading the team since 1997. The team has won the Middlesex League Championship seven times under Boyages, in 1997, 1999, 2000, 2001, making it to the Division II "Super Bowl" State Championships each of those years. In 1999, the team earned its first Super Bowl Championship, with a 13–7 win over Acton-Boxboro High School. The Warrior football team plays home games at Landrigan Field, named for alumnus Jim Landrigan, who went on to play in the NFL.

In 1997, both the boys' and girls' basketball teams from Wakefield High School won Division II state championships, and the boys' soccer team won the state title that same year, defeating East Longmeadow High School 1–0 to win the state championship.

The 2007–2008 girls' ice hockey team advanced to the state championship game for the first time in Wakefield history.

In the fall of 2008, the varsity dance team (under the direction of Candice Spencer and Stacey Gargano) took 3rd place in the MSSAA State Dance Tournament.

In the fall of 2009, the varsity dance team (under the direction of Candice Spencer) took 3rd place in the division of High School Varsity Dance and took 3rd place overall in the entire Dance Division at the New England Cheer and Dance Tournament. In the fall of 2009, the varsity dance team was honored with the team academic excellence award from the MSSAA.

The 2010–2011 boys' hockey team advanced to the Division One Championship at the TD Garden and was the 2010–2011 Division One North Hockey Champions.

Since 2024, the director of athletics for Wakefield Public Schools has been Mr. Michael Murphy.

== Performing arts ==
The Performing Arts Director for Wakefield Public Schools is Mr. Thomas Bankert.

The Warrior Marching Band competes in the MICCA and NESBA competitions circuits each year. Wakefield hosts its own MICCA competition every October at Landrigan Field with the Warrior Marching Band as the last band to perform. The band's 2008 show, "A Moonwalk Through Time," was a collection of Michael Jackson music and featured the musicians dancing the Thriller in the midst of the performance. The band came in first place in their division at NESBA Finals and won a gold medal for the first time since 2003. Its 2011 show, based on the music of Aerosmith, came in first with a platinum medal at NESBA Finals. Since then, the marching band has performed shows such as a tribute to Stevie Wonder, the music of Dave Matthews Band, Disney's Frozen, Double Agent, Immortal, Mirror Mirror, Flight, Route 66, Street Lights Big Dreams and Dreamland. In 2016, the Wakefield Warrior Marching band came in 2nd at NESBA finals, earning a 96.0, a platinum medal, and the Best Drum Major Award. The Wakefield Warrior Marching band also had a two 5 star sweep at both of their MICCA competitions. At MICCA finals, the band earned a perfect score, winning MICCA Finals. In 2018 their performance of their show Flight earned them 2nd place at the NESBA Finals. As of 2025, the Wakefield Warrior Marching band has maintained a 3-year regional championship victory streak with their shows Into the Storm, Mad Scientist, and Gatsby, an adaptation of the 2013 film.

The Drama Club, which is headed by English and theatre teacher William Karvouniaris, puts on three productions each year: a musical piece in the fall, a 40-minute piece in the winter (which they bring to the Massachusetts High School Drama Guild One-Act Festival), and a play in the spring. (This order changed as of 2017–2018 school year.) The spring 2017 musical Joseph and the Amazing Technicolor Dreamcoat earned a MET Musical Award for set design and props management. In 2018, The Drama Club's Fest Piece (Anatomy of Gray) moved into the semifinals of the METG Festival. In 2018, the fall musical production of Fiddler on the Roof received seven MET award nominations, winning two. In 2023 their production of Annie received nominations for Best Supporting Actress and Achievement in Costume Design.

WMHS has an active choral program, including three curricular choruses and two extracurricular a cappella groups called Voices of Steel and Mic Drop. Voices of Steel is an auditioned and competitive group.

In summer 2010, the Drama Club participated in the American High School Theatre Festival at the Fringe Festival in Edinburgh Festival Fringe, one of the largest performing arts festivals in the world. The Drama Club was accepted after a representative for AHSTF saw their February 2008 performance of Cymbeline at the Massachusetts High School Drama Guild One-Act Festival. At The Fringe, the club performed an original play by Emily Holmes, Pandora's Book.

Both the Chamber Singers and Warrior Marching Band have performed the National Anthem at Fenway Park.

In December of 2015, the Wakefield High School Winter Percussion ensemble would be offered as an extracurricular.

In March 2016, the Wakefield High School Winter Guard team won first place in their division at the 2016 NESBA winter guard finals. The team had an undefeated regular season as well.

On February 11, 2017, the school's all-girls a cappella group She Major placed third in the International Championship of High School A Cappella quarterfinals, winning them a spot in the semifinals.

== Visual Arts ==
The Wakefield High School Visual Arts program consists of 2-D, 3-D, digital and film and video courses. WPS Visual Arts can be found on Facebook as well as Instagram. Film & Video can be found on YouTube.

== Demographics ==
The racial makeup of Wakefield High School is: 80% White, 10% Hispanic, 4% Asian, 4% Black, and 2% American Indian/Multi-Race.

Wakefield High School participates in the METCO program, a grant program funded by the Commonwealth intended to reduce racial imbalance. Students from the cities, such as Boston are given the opportunity to attend Wakefield High School.

== Notable alumni ==
- John T. Broderick Jr., Chief Justice of the New Hampshire Supreme Court and speaker on mental health awareness (1965 graduate)
- Bruce Brown, Basketball player for the Toronto Raptors of the NBA; 2023 NBA champion with the Denver Nuggets
- Scott Brown, Massachusetts State Senator and US Senator
- Stephen Carriere (2007 Graduate), 2007 World Junior Champion in figure skating (men's singles)
- David Dellinger, Radical pacifist and member of the Chicago Seven
- Anthony Fabiano, 2015 Harvard graduate and NFL center
- Israel Horovitz, Playwright, Father of Adam "Ad-Rock" Horovitz
- Mark Kumpel, Member of the 1984 US Olympic Ice Hockey Team and former NHL player with the Winnipeg Jets, Quebec Nordiques, and the Detroit Red Wings
- Dave Lapham, Cincinnati Bengals radio broadcaster and formerly a player for the Bengals and USFL team the New Jersey Generals
- Marcia Pankratz, Member of the 1988 and 1996 Olympic field hockey team and former head coach of field hockey at the University of Michigan
- Mark Plansky, notable college basketball player for Villanova University in the 1980s
- Buffy Sainte-Marie, folk singer
