= Winnie McLaughlin =

American lawyer (1882–1964)

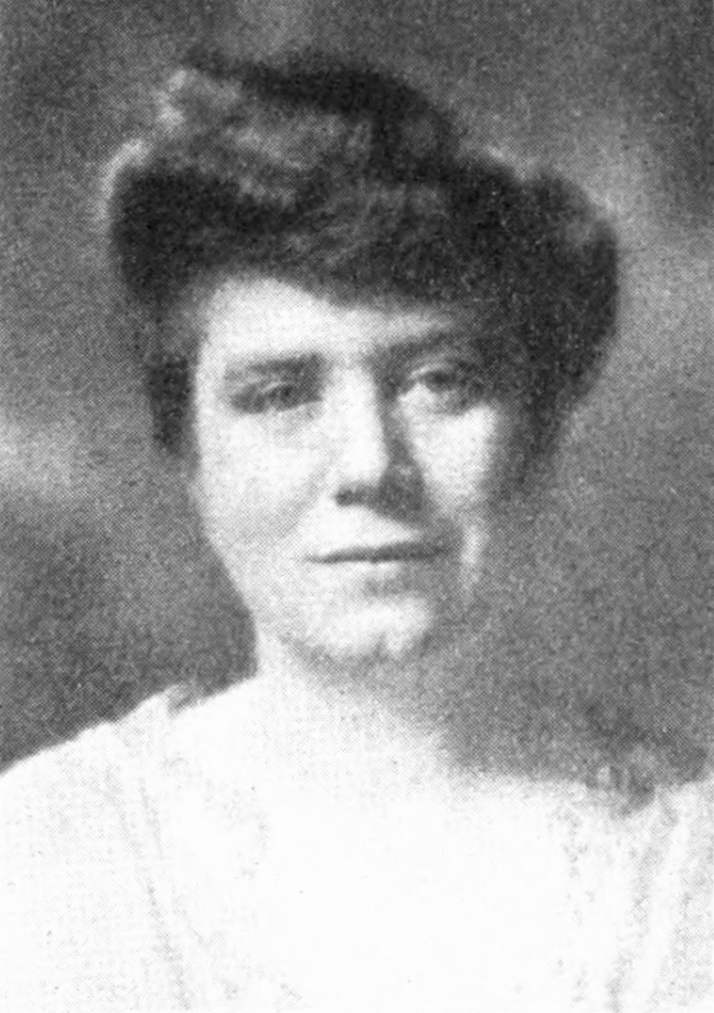
- Born: Agnes Winifred McLaughlin; April 15, 1882; Coös County, New Hampshire, US
- Died: October 29, 1964 (aged 82); Berlin, New Hampshire, US
- Occupation: Lawyer

Agnes Winifred McLaughlin (April 15, 1882 – October 29, 1964) was the first woman admitted to practice law in New Hampshire.

== Early life and work ==
McLaughlin was born in Coös County, New Hampshire, on April 15, 1882, and she was raised in Lancaster, New Hampshire.

== Becoming an attorney ==
McLaughlin petitioned the New Hampshire Supreme Court "that she may be allowed to take an examination with a view to [bar] admission". Her petition states she studied law under two different attorneys from 1911 until 1917 and at the University of Maine Law School. She became the first woman allowed to practice law in New Hampshire on June 30, 1917.

== Career and death ==
She later worked in a new estate planning division at the Equitable Life Insurance Company. She died on October 29, 1964.

== Legacy ==
The New Hampshire Women's Bar Association, in partnership with the University of New Hampshire Franklin Pierce School of Law, has created a scholarship given to a second year law student each year that is named in McLaughlin's honor.

== See also ==
- List of first women lawyers and judges in New Hampshire
