= William Johnson (New Hampshire judge) =

American judge and politician

Member of the New Hampshire Senate
- In office 1964–???

Chair of the New Hampshire Republican Party
- In office 1964–1966

Justice of the New Hampshire Supreme Court
- In office 1985–1999
- Succeeded by: Joseph P. Nadeau

Personal details
- Born: October 21, 1930 Excelsior, Minnesota, U.S.
- Died: May 30, 2009 (aged 78) Roanoke Rapids, North Carolina, U.S.
- Spouse: Nancy Johnson
- Education: Dartmouth College; Harvard Law School
- Occupation: Judge

William Reynold Johnson (October 21, 1930 – May 30, 2009) was an American judge and politician. He served as a member of the New Hampshire Senate and as a justice of the New Hampshire Supreme Court.

== Life and career ==
Johnson was born in Excelsior, Minnesota. He attended Dartmouth College and Harvard Law School. He served in the United States Army.

In 1964, Johnson was elected to the New Hampshire Senate. In the same year, he was chairperson of the New Hampshire Republican Party, serving until 1966.

In 1985, Johnson was appointed to serve as a justice of the New Hampshire Supreme Court, serving until 1999.

Johnson died in May 2009 in Roanoke Rapids, North Carolina, at the age of 78.
