= Patrick E. Donovan =

American judge (born 1964)

Patrick Donovan

Chief Justice of the New Hampshire Supreme Court
- Acting
- Assumed office September 15, 2026
- Preceded by: Gordon J. MacDonald

Associate Justice of the New Hampshire Supreme Court
- Incumbent
- Assumed office May 8, 2018
- Appointed by: Chris Sununu
- Preceded by: Robert Lynn

Personal details
- Born: Patrick Eugene Donovan; May 8, 1964 (age 62) Baltimore, Maryland, U.S.
- Party: Republican
- Spouse: Monique Deragon
- Children: 4
- Education: Dartmouth College (AB); Boston College (JD)

Patrick Eugene Donovan (born May 8, 1964) is an American lawyer who has served as an associate justice of the New Hampshire Supreme Court since 2018.

== Education ==
Donovan graduated from Salem High School in Salem, New Hampshire.

He received his Bachelor of Arts from Dartmouth College in 1986. He received his Juris Doctor from Boston College Law School in 1990, where he served as Articles Editor for the Boston College Environmental Law Review.

== Career ==
After graduating law school, Donovan clerked for Justice W. Stephen Thayer III of the New Hampshire Supreme Court. He went on to spend three years as an associate with Goodwin Procter in Boston, where he focused on environmental litigation, before accepting an appointment to the New Hampshire Department of Justice in 1994. Donovan served as an assistant and senior assistant attorney general for six years, litigating complex civil matters, homicide cases and state and federal court appeals. In 2000, he returned to private practice and opened his own firm in Salem, New Hampshire. While in private practice, Donovan served as Legal Counsel to the New Hampshire House of Representatives in the office of speaker Doug Scamman. In 2008, he became a sole practitioner at his law firm Patrick E. Donovan, PLLC.

=== New Hampshire Supreme Court ===
On March 21, 2018, Governor Chris Sununu nominated Donovan to serve on the New Hampshire Supreme Court. He was unanimously confirmed by the Executive Council, and was sworn into office on May 8, 2018.

== Personal life ==
Patrick was born in Baltimore, Maryland, then moved to Salem, New Hampshire, at age 12. He and his wife, Monique Donovan (formerly Deragon) have four children.

Legal offices
Preceded by Robert Lynn	Associate Justice of the New Hampshire Supreme Court; 2018–present	Incumbent
Preceded by Gordon J. MacDonald	Chief Justice of the New Hampshire Supreme Court; Acting; 2026–present	Incumbent
