= Joseph P. Nadeau =

American judge (born 1936)

Joseph P. Nadeau (born 1936) was a justice of the New Hampshire Supreme Court from 2000 to 2005.

Nadeau attended Phillips Exeter Academy, and received a B.A. from Dartmouth College and a J.D. from Boston University School of Law.

In January 2000, Governor Jeanne Shaheen nominated Nadeau to a seat on the state supreme court vacated by the retirement of Justice William Johnson.

Nadeau retired from the court in 2005 to take an opportunity to assist Iraqi judges in setting up a new judiciary system for the country, following the toppling of the government of Saddam Hussein in the Iraq War.

Political offices
Preceded by William Johnson	Justice of the New Hampshire Supreme Court; 2000–2005	Succeeded by Gary Hicks
