= Peter Burling =

Peter Burling may refer to:

- Peter Burling (politician) (born 1945), American politician
- Peter Burling (sailor) (born 1991), New Zealand sailor
