= Villa Augustina School =

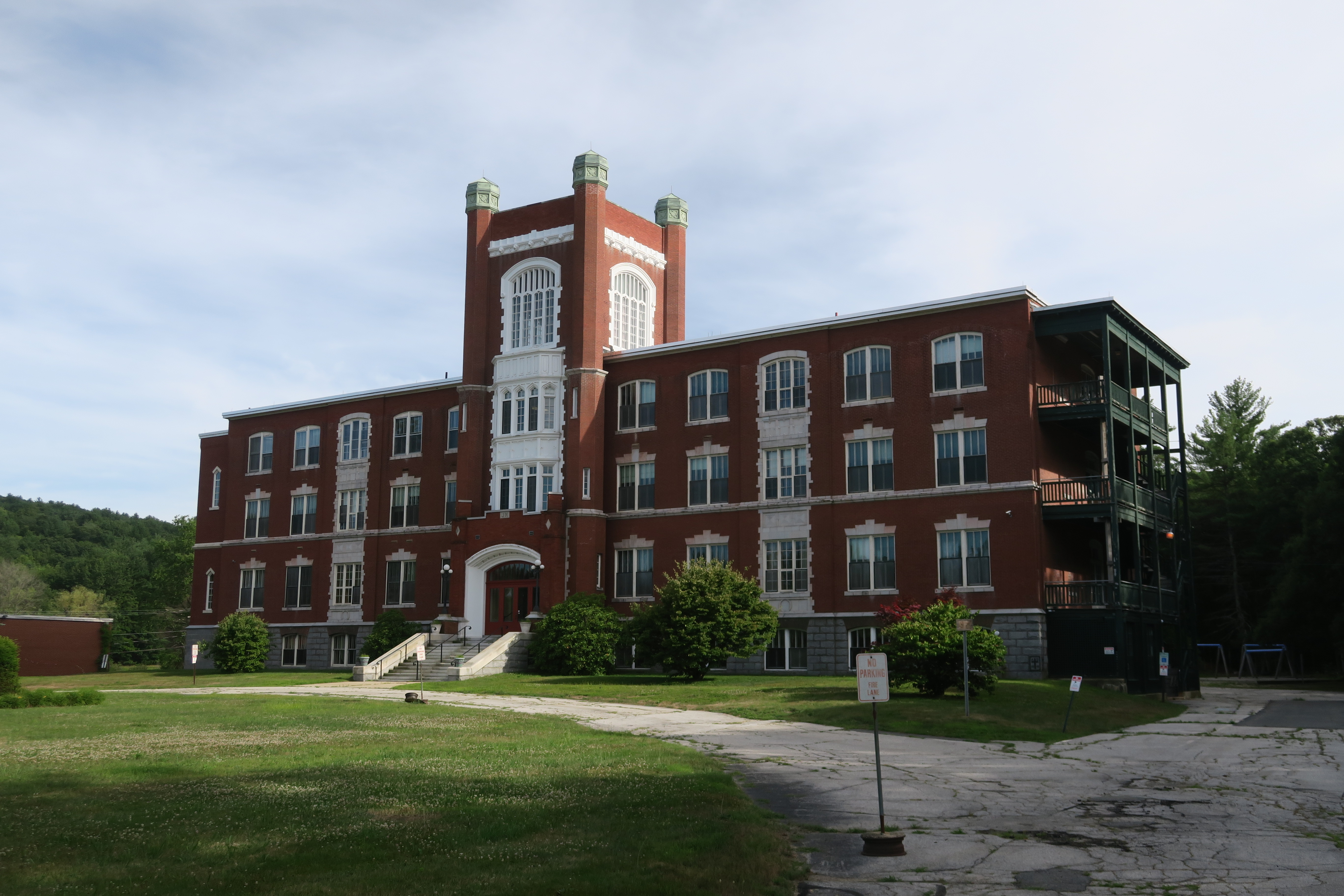

Location
- 208 South Mast Road; Goffstown, NH, USA
- Coordinates: 43°00′45″N 71°34′30″W

Information
- Type: Private, Coeducational
- Established: 1918
- Closed: 2014
- Principal: Beverly Broomhall
- Faculty: 26
- Grades: Pre-Kindergarten – 8
- Enrollment: 176 Students (2009)
- Campus: Suburban
- Colors: Blue and White
- Mascot: Saints
- Accreditation: New England Association of Schools and Colleges
- Affiliation: Roman Catholic Diocese of Manchester

The Villa Augustina School was a private Catholic school located in Goffstown, New Hampshire, United States. It served the town of Goffstown and the surrounding communities. In September 2009 the school had a total enrollment of 176 students. Villa Augustina School closed as of June 30, 2014. The building and 31 ares of property were bought by RdF Corp. of Hudson, New Hampshire in 2015 but the company does not appear to be making use of the building as of 2025.

== History ==
The Villa Augustina school was founded in 1918 by the Religious of Jesus and Mary as an all-girls Catholic high school. The school was a gift from Msgr. Augustin Chevalier, a pastor at Saint Augustin church in Manchester, New Hampshire, and after whom the school was named.

During the 1960s the school saw many changes. Rosary Hall, the building adjacent to the main building, was constructed in 1962. In this building is the cafeteria, gym, stage and classroom space. In 1968, the decision was made to close the high school portion of the school and expand the elementary and junior high. During this period of changes, boys were admitted to the school for the second time. (The first time was in the mid-1950s for only one year.) In addition, the school changed from a boarding school to a day school, and the kindergarten was established.

Pre-kindergarten was established in 1985, as well as morning and after care. A summer camp, Camp Thevenet, was established in the late 1980s as well. In 1989, the school board was established to allow the parents and community an opportunity to oversee operations and future development of the school.

In 2008 the Religious of Jesus and Mary announced that they could no longer support the school financially and would need to close it down. After six months of planning, the parents formed a cooperation, St. Claudine Villa Academy, and bought the school.

On June 16, 2014, the New Hampshire Union Leader reported that the Villa Augustina school would close effective June 30, 2014, due to the inability to attract enough students to cover the expenses associated with running the school. It was purchased the followed year by RdF Corp., a company that makes sensors, but as of 2025 no obvious use is being made of the building.

== Administration ==
The school's most recent principal was Beverly Broomhall.

== Notable alumni ==
- Linda S. Dalianis, Class of 1966, Chief Justice of the New Hampshire Supreme Court (2010–2018)
