= Jennie Blanche Newhall =

American attorney

Personal details
- Born: June 8, 1874 Concord, New Hampshire, U.S.
- Died: March 4, 1943
- Education: Concord High School; Hamilton College

Jennie Blanche Newhall (1874–1943) was an American attorney. She was the second woman admitted to practice law in the state of New Hampshire.

== Early life and education ==
Newhall was born in Concord, New Hampshire, on June 8, 1874. She graduated from Concord High School and took correspondence courses at Hamilton College's Law School. She also studied under New Hampshire attorneys and worked as a secretary for the New Hampshire Attorney General.

== Legal career ==
Attorney Newhall petitioned for bar admittance in 1919 and passed the New Hampshire bar examination in 1920. On June 30, 1920, Newhall was admitted to practice in the state of New Hampshire. She was the first woman law clerk in the New Hampshire Attorney General's Office and served in that role for more than 25 years. During this time, she argued many cases before the New Hampshire Supreme Court and became an expert in New Hampshire corporation law.

In 1927, Newhall applied to become a Justice of the Peace. Her application was sent to the New Hampshire Supreme Court to determine if a woman could hold this title. Newhall argued before the court pro se. The Court ruled that although there was not a constitutional bar to appointing women to this office, legislation first needed to be passed to allow it. In response, Newhall drafted the appropriate legislation and successfully lobbied for its passage in 1929. In February of that year, Newhall was the first woman to be appointed Justice of the Peace in New Hampshire, by Governor Charles W. Tobey and the New Hampshire Executive Council.

Newhall also served as the Vice President of the National Association of Women Lawyers.

== See also ==
- List of first women lawyers and judges in New Hampshire
