= Robert J. Lynn (New Hampshire judge) =

American judge

Bob Lynn
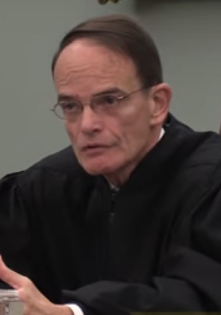

Member of the New Hampshire House of Representatives from the Rockingham 17th district Rockingham 7th(2020 - 2022)
- Incumbent
- Assumed office December 2, 2020

Chief Justice of the New Hampshire Supreme Court
- In office April 9, 2018 – August 23, 2019
- Appointed by: Chris Sununu
- Preceded by: Linda Dalianis
- Succeeded by: Gary Hicks

Associate Justice of the New Hampshire Supreme Court
- In office November 30, 2010 – April 9, 2018
- Appointed by: John Lynch
- Preceded by: John T. Broderick Jr.
- Succeeded by: Patrick E. Donovan

Personal details
- Born: August 26, 1949 (age 76) New Haven, Connecticut, U.S.
- Party: Republican
- Spouse: Dina Chaitowitz
- Education: University of New Haven (BA); University of Connecticut, Hartford (JD)

Robert J. Lynn (born August 26, 1949) served as the 36th Chief Justice of the New Hampshire Supreme Court. He was sworn in on April 9, 2018. Immediately prior he served as an associate justice of the New Hampshire Supreme Court, nominated by Governor John Lynch in 2010. From 1992 to 2010, he served as a justice on the New Hampshire Superior Court. He graduated from University of Connecticut School of Law in 1975. In 2020, Lynn was elected to the New Hampshire House of Representatives.

Legal offices
Preceded by Linda Dalianis	Chief Justice of the New Hampshire Supreme Court; 2018–2019	Succeeded by Gary Hicks; Acting
