= Jim Landrigan =

American football player (1923–1974)

No. 45
- Position: Tackle

Personal information
- Born: May 31, 1923; Everett, Massachusetts, U.S.
- Died: June 24, 1974 (aged 51); San Diego, California, U.S.
- Listed height: 6 ft 4 in (1.93 m)
- Listed weight: 235 lb (107 kg)

Career information
- High school: Wakefield (MA)
- College: Holy Cross; Dartmouth
- NFL draft: 1945: 19th round, 188th overall pick

Career history
- Baltimore Colts (1947)

Career AAFC statistics
- Games played: 5
- Stats at Pro Football Reference

James Montague Landrigan (May 31, 1923 – June 24, 1974) was an American football player who played at the tackle position.

A native of Everett, Massachusetts, he attended Wakefield High School and then played college football for Holy Cross in 1942 and at Dartmouth in 1943 as part of the V-12 Navy College Training Program. He was selected by the Pittsburgh Steelers in the 19th round (188th overall pick) of the 1945 NFL draft but did not play for the Steelers. He later played in the All-America Football Conference (AAFC) for the Baltimore Colts during the 1947 season. He appeared in a total of five AAFC games.

Landrigan was a career officer in the United States Marine Corps. He served in World War II, the Korean War, and the Vietnam War. He served in the Pacific during World War II and was awarded the Purple Heart and Silver Star. He retired from the Navy in 1973 with the rank of colonel.

Landrigan Field, home turf of the Wakefield Warriors of Wakefield Memorial High School, Wakefield, Massachusetts, is named for him.
