= Margaret Sheehan Blodgett =

American attorney

Personal details
- Born: October 13, 1897 Manchester, New Hampshire, U.S.
- Died: June 16, 1987 Centerville, Massachusetts, U.S.
- Education: Mount Saint Mary School; Trinity Washington University, B.A. Portia Law School

Margaret Sheehan Blodgett (October 13, 1897 – June 16, 1987) was an American attorney. She was the third woman to be admitted to the New Hampshire Bar Association.

== Early life and education ==
Blodgett was born in Manchester, New Hampshire, on October 13, 1897. She went to Mount Saint Mary School in Hooksett, New Hampshire, before earning her Bachelor of Arts from Trinity College in Washington, D.C. She studied law at Portia Law School (now New England Law Boston) and graduated in 1925.

== Legal career ==
Blodgett was honored as an "unsung heroine" by the New Hampshire Commission on the Status of Women in 1986.

== See also ==
- List of first women lawyers and judges in New Hampshire
