= Jane E. Young =

American lawyer

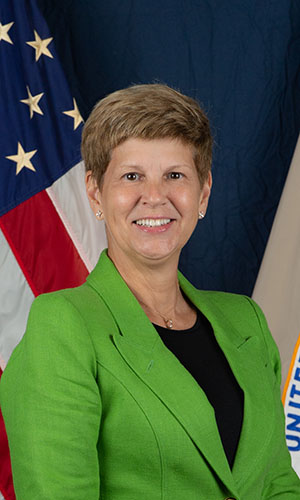

United States Attorney for the District of New Hampshire
- In office May 2, 2022 – January 17, 2025
- Appointed by: Joe Biden
- Preceded by: Scott W. Murray
- Succeeded by: Jay McCormack (acting)

Attorney General of New Hampshire
- Acting
- In office January 3, 2021 – April 2, 2021
- Preceded by: Gordon J. MacDonald
- Succeeded by: John Formella

Personal details
- Education: Saint Anselm College (BA); University of New Hampshire (JD)

Jane Ellen Young is an American lawyer who had served as the United States Attorney for the District of New Hampshire.

== Education ==
Young received her Bachelor of Arts from Saint Anselm College in 1986 and her Juris Doctor from the University of New Hampshire School of Law in 1989.

== Career ==
From 1990 to 1992, Young served as an assistant county attorney in the Hillsborough County Attorney's Office. She was with the New Hampshire Department of Justice from 1992 to 2022, holding various positions throughout her career. From 2006 to 2007, she served as chief of the drug unit, from 2007 to 2017, she served as chief of the criminal justice bureau and from 2017 to 2018, she served as director of the division of public protection. From 2018 to 2022, she served as the deputy attorney general.

Young became the deputy attorney general on July 2, 2018. On January 7, 2021, Young became acting attorney general of New Hampshire after Gordon J. MacDonald was nominated as chief justice of the New Hampshire Supreme Court.

=== U.S. attorney for the District of New Hampshire ===
On January 26, 2022, President Joe Biden announced his intent to nominate Young to be the United States Attorney for the District of New Hampshire. On January 31, 2022, her nomination was sent to the United States Senate. On March 10, 2022, her nomination was favorably reported out of the Senate Judiciary Committee. On April 27, 2022, her nomination was confirmed in the Senate by voice vote. She was sworn in on May 2, 2022.

On January 17, 2025, Young resigned.

Legal offices
Preceded by Scott W. Murray	United States Attorney for the District of New Hampshire; 2022–present	Incumbent
