= Tomson v. Ward =

Tomson v. Ward 1 N.H. 9 (1816) was the first New Hampshire Supreme Court decision recorded in the official New Hampshire reports.

== Ruling ==
In the case the New Hampshire Supreme Court ruled that "[a]n unrecorded deed of lands voluntarily given up, and cancelled by the parties to it, with intent to revest the estate in the grantor, as between them and as to all subsequent claimants under them, operates as a reconveyance, and revests the estate in the grantor."
