= Richard E. Galway =

New Hampshire Supreme Court justice

Associate Justice of the New Hampshire Supreme Court
- In office February 13, 2004 – February 1, 2009
- Appointed by: Craig Benson

Personal details
- Born: January 21, 1944 (age 82) Manchester, New Hampshire, U.S.

Richard Edward Galway Jr. (born January 21, 1944) is a former Associate Justice of the New Hampshire Supreme Court. He was sworn in on February 13, 2004. He retired as of February 1, 2009.

Galway attended Bishop Bradley High School in Manchester, New Hampshire. After graduating magna cum laude with a Bachelor of Arts degree in political science from the University of New Hampshire in 1966, Galway spent a year in England at the University of Leeds as a Fulbright Scholar, continuing his studies in political science. He then attended Boston University Law School, earning his J.D. in 1970. He was admitted to the New Hampshire Bar Association that year.

Prior to becoming a New Hampshire Supreme Court justice, Richard Galway was a trial lawyer at the Manchester law firm Devine Millimet for 25 years. He is considered a leading expert in workers' compensation law and has written two books and many articles on the subject. He became a New Hampshire Superior Court Associate Justice on February 3, 1995, and continued in that role until he was sworn into the NH Supreme Court.
