= List of first minority male lawyers and judges in New Hampshire =

This is a list of the first minority male lawyer(s) and judge(s) in New Hampshire. It includes the year in which the men were admitted to practice law (in parentheses). Also included are those who achieved other distinctions, such becoming the first in their state to graduate from law school or become a political figure.

== Firsts in New Hampshire's history ==
=== Lawyers ===
- First African American male: William Henry Johnson (1865)
- First African American male to appear before a New Hampshire court: Henry E. Quarles, Sr. (1920)
- First Brazilian American male: Bruno D'Britto (2021)

=== State judges ===
- First African American male (justice of the peace): Wentworth Cheswill in 1805
- First Jewish American male (probate court): Harry Lichman during the 1940s
- First Jewish American male (municipal court): Bernard Snierson during the 1940s
- First African American male: Ivorey Cobb in 1968
- First Jewish American male (superior court): Philip Hollman in 1987

=== Federal judges ===
- First Jewish American male (United States District Court for the District of New Hampshire): Norman H. Stahl in 1990

=== Attorney General of New Hampshire ===
- First Jewish American male: Warren Rudman in 1970

=== Political office ===
- First Jewish American male (congressional representative): Paul Hodes in 2007

=== New Hampshire Bar Association ===
- First Asian American male (president): Richard Uchida in 2005

== See also ==
- List of first minority male lawyers and judges in the United States

== Other topics of interest ==
- List of first women lawyers and judges in the United States
- List of first women lawyers and judges in New Hampshire
