= Anthony Fabiano =

American football player (born 1993)

Cleveland Browns
- Title: Scouting Assistant

Personal information
- Born: July 13, 1993 (age 33); Wakefield, Massachusetts
- Listed height: 6 ft 4 in (1.93 m)
- Listed weight: 303 lb (137 kg)

Career information
- High school: Wakefield Memorial
- College: Harvard
- NFL draft: 2016: undrafted

Career history

Playing
- Baltimore Ravens (2016)*; Cleveland Browns (2016); Washington Redskins (2017)*; New York Giants (2017)*; New England Patriots (2017)*; Indianapolis Colts (2017); Cleveland Browns (2018)*; Philadelphia Eagles (2018–2019)*; Tampa Bay Buccaneers (2019–2020)*; Green Bay Packers (2020)*; Cleveland Browns (2020)
- * Offseason or practice squad member only

Operations
- Cleveland Browns (2021–present) Scouting assistant

Career NFL statistics
- Games played: 9
- Games started: 2
- Stats at Pro Football Reference

Anthony Fabiano (born July 13, 1993) is a scouting assistant for the Cleveland Browns and former American football center. He played college football for the Harvard Crimson and was signed by the Baltimore Ravens as an undrafted free agent in 2016. He also played for the Cleveland Browns and Indianapolis Colts.

== Early life ==
During high school, he played defensive end and tight end at Wakefield High School and was team captain his senior year. He also led his team with nine sacks, 57 tackles, and had 23 catches for 267 receiving yards. He was a two-year starter on the football team. He also played basketball at Wakefield High.

During his junior year, he received an offer from Harvard after sending all the Ivy League schools game film. He also received an offer from Boston College but verbally committed to Harvard, solely based on academics, where he was elected a member of the Owl Club

== College career ==
Fabiano began attending Harvard in 2012 as a freshman and played in 10 games at left tackle that season. He followed it up, playing in five games the next season in 2013. In 2014, he started all ten games at right guard and began generating interest from NFL scouts for his athletic ability and versatility. For his senior season, he was named to Reese's Senior bowl watch list and was likely on track for an invitation to the senior bowl after playing in seven games. On October 30, 2015, he suffered a major injury when he hyper extended his toe, partially tore a toe tendon, and fractured bone in his foot in a game against Dartmouth virtually ending his season and collegiate career.

== Professional career ==
=== Pre-draft ===
Fabiano was scheduled to miss both the NFL Scouting Combine and Harvard's Pro Day due to a toe/foot injury he suffered in October. He used an ARP Wave Machine to accelerate the healing process and was able to begin training six weeks before Harvard's Pro Day. He was able to go through all the workouts and positional drills in front of scouts and representatives from 20 NFL teams. According to the Seattle Seahawks' SPARQ formula that evaluates a prospect's athletic ability, Fabiano was rated the most athletic offensive line prospect in the 2016 NFL draft.

Pre-draft measurables
| Height | Weight | 40-yard dash | 10-yard split | 20-yard split | 20-yard shuttle | Three-cone drill | Vertical jump | Broad jump | Bench press |
|---|---|---|---|---|---|---|---|---|---|
| 6 ft 3 1/2 in (1.92 m) | 303 lb (137 kg) | 5.04 s | 1.68 s | 2.78 s | 4.42 s | 7.41 s | 32 1/2 in (0.83 m) | 9 ft 0 in (2.74 m) | 25 reps |
All values from New Mexico's Pro Day

=== Baltimore Ravens ===
Fabiano signed with the Baltimore Ravens as an undrafted free agent on May 6, 2016. On August 29, 2016, he was released by the Ravens.

=== Cleveland Browns ===
On September 5, 2016, the Cleveland Browns signed Fabiano to their practice squad. He was promoted to the active roster on October 5. He was waived on October 10, and re-signed to the practice squad on October 12. On December 5, Fabiano was promoted to the active roster after injuries to John Greco, Joel Bitonio, and Austin Reiter. On September 2, 2017, Fabiano was waived by the Browns.

=== Washington Redskins ===
On September 4, 2017, Fabiano was signed to the Washington Redskins' practice squad. He was released on September 11, 2017.

=== New York Giants ===
On October 4, 2017, Fabiano was signed to the New York Giants' practice squad. He was released on October 10, 2017.

=== New England Patriots ===
On November 9, 2017, Fabiano was signed to the New England Patriots' practice squad, but was released two days later.

=== Indianapolis Colts ===
On November 28, 2017, Fabiano was signed to the Indianapolis Colts' practice squad. He was promoted to the active roster on December 2, 2017. He was waived by the Colts on May 14, 2018.

=== Cleveland Browns (second stint) ===
On May 15, 2018, Fabiano was claimed off waivers by the Cleveland Browns. He was waived on August 31, 2018.

=== Philadelphia Eagles ===
On November 20, 2018, Fabiano was signed to the Philadelphia Eagles practice squad.

Fabiano signed a reserve/future contract with the Eagles on January 14, 2019. He was waived during final roster cuts on August 30, 2019.

=== Tampa Bay Buccaneers ===
On October 16, 2019, Fabiano was signed to the Tampa Bay Buccaneers practice squad. He signed a reserve/future contract with the Buccaneers on December 30, 2019.

On September 5, 2020, Fabiano was waived by the Buccaneers.

=== Green Bay Packers ===
On December 8, 2020, Fabiano signed with the practice squad of the Green Bay Packers. On December 22, 2020, Fabiano was released.

=== Cleveland Browns (third stint) ===
On January 6, 2021, Fabiano was signed to the Cleveland Browns' active roster.

== Executive career ==
=== Cleveland Browns ===
On June 6, 2021, Fabiano was hired by the Browns as a scouting assistant.
