= Gary E. Hicks =

American judge (born 1953)

Gary Hicks

Chief Justice of the New Hampshire Supreme Court Acting
- In office August 23, 2019 – March 4, 2021
- Preceded by: Robert J. Lynn
- Succeeded by: Gordon J. MacDonald

Associate Justice of the New Hampshire Supreme Court
- In office January 31, 2006 – November 30, 2023
- Appointed by: John Lynch
- Preceded by: Joseph P. Nadeau
- Succeeded by: Melissa Beth Countway

Personal details
- Born: November 30, 1953 (age 71) Colebrook, New Hampshire, U.S.
- Education: Bucknell University (BA); Boston University (JD)

Gary Ellis Hicks (born November 30, 1953) is an American lawyer who served as an associate justice of the New Hampshire Supreme Court from 2006 to 2023. He was sworn in January 31, 2006.

Hicks obtained his degree in mathematics from Bucknell University in 1975. He is a 1978 graduate of Boston University School of Law.

Before being sworn in to the New Hampshire Supreme Court, Hicks worked for Wiggin & Nourie for 23 years. He reached mandatory retirement age on November 30, 2023.

He is the former chairman of the American Inns of Court Leadership Council, and the American Inns Nomination Committee. Hicks was presented with the 2021 Civil Justice Award by the New Hampshire Access to Justice Commission.

Legal offices
Preceded by Joseph P. Nadeau	Associate Justice of the New Hampshire Supreme Court; 2006–2023	Succeeded by Melissa Beth Countway
Preceded by Bob Lynn	Chief Justice of the New Hampshire Supreme Court; Acting; 2019–2021	Succeeded by Gordon MacDonald
