= Melissa Beth Countway =

American judge (born 1970 or 1971)

Melissa Countway

Associate Justice of the New Hampshire Supreme Court
- Incumbent
- Assumed office January 2, 2024
- Appointed by: Chris Sununu
- Preceded by: Gary Hicks

Personal details
- Born: 1970 or 1971 (age 54–55)
- Education: University of New Hampshire (BS, MEd); University of North Carolina, Chapel Hill (JD)

Melissa Beth Countway (born 1970 or 1971) is an American lawyer who is serving as an associate justice of the New Hampshire Supreme Court.

== Education ==
Countway earned a Bachelor of Science in 1993 and a Master of Education in 1994, both from the University of New Hampshire, and a Juris Doctor from the University of North Carolina at Chapel Hill School of Law in 2002, while serving on the North Carolina Law Review.

== Career ==
From 2002 to 2003, she was a law clerk for the New Hampshire Supreme Court. From 2003 to 2004, she was an associate with Orr & Reno, P.A. From 2006 to 2011, she was a managing member of Alton Law Offices, PLLC, and from 2010 to 2011 she was also a police prosecutor at the Alton Police Department. From 2011 to 2017, she was the Belknap County Attorney. From August 2017 to January 2024 she served as a judge on the New Hampshire Circuit Court.

=== New Hampshire Supreme Court ===
On November 8, 2023, Governor Chris Sununu nominated Countway to serve as an associate justice of the New Hampshire Supreme Court to the seat left vacant by the retirement of Justice Gary Hicks on November 30, 2023. On November 29, a hearing was held on her nomination. During her hearing, she assured the council she was not a judicial activist and declined to answer questions about reproductive rights. On December 20, 2023, her nomination was confirmed by the Executive Council of New Hampshire by a 4–1 vote. She was sworn in on January 2, 2024.

Legal offices
Preceded by Gary Hicks	Associate Justice of the New Hampshire Supreme Court; 2024–present	Incumbent
