= John T. Broderick Jr. =

American judge (born 1947)

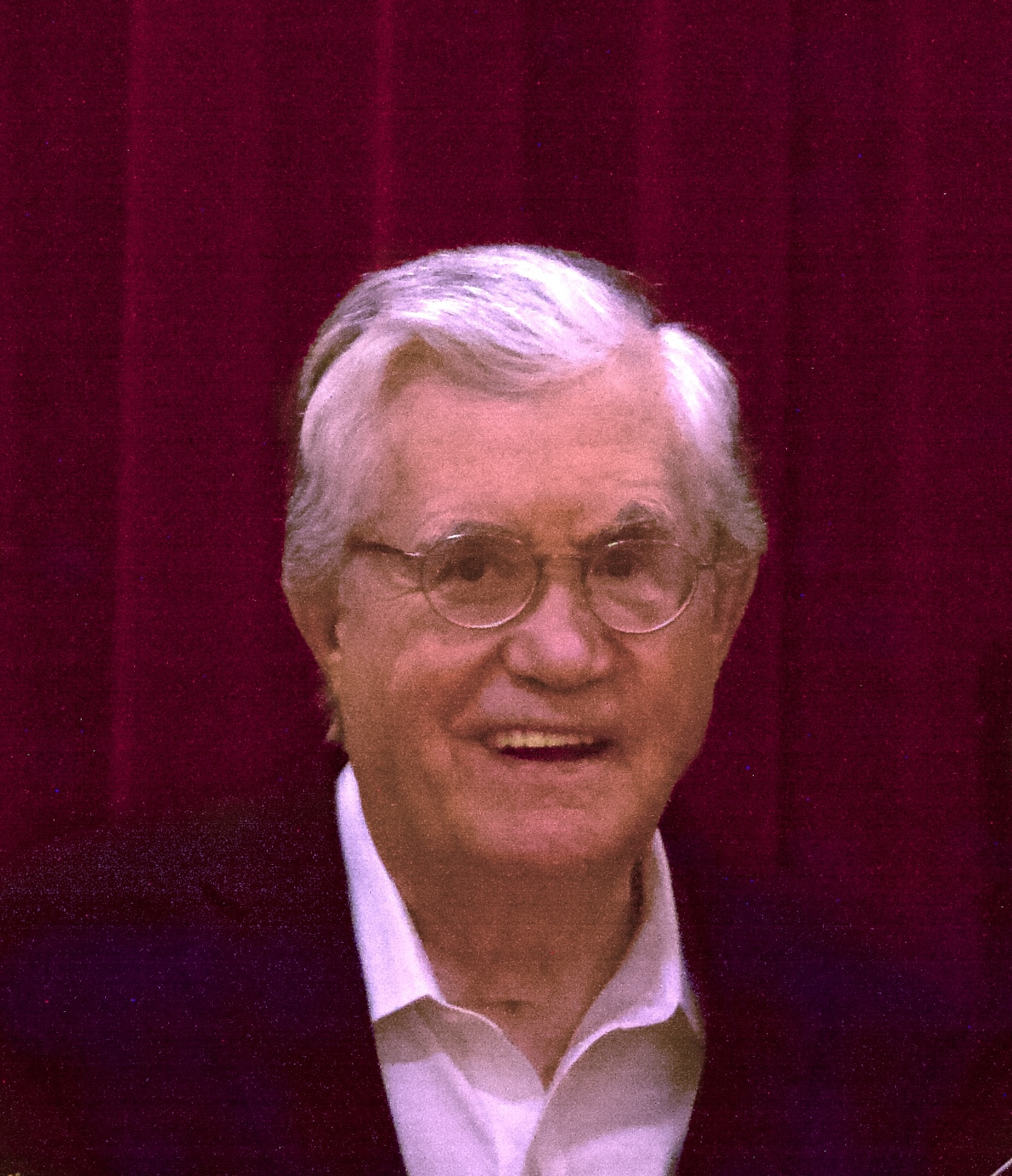
- Broderick in 2025

Chief Justice of the New Hampshire Supreme Court
- In office 2004–2010
- Preceded by: David A. Brock
- Succeeded by: Linda Dalianis

Associate Justice of the New Hampshire Supreme Court
- In office 1995–2004
- Preceded by: William F. Batchelder
- Succeeded by: Richard E. Galway

Personal details
- Born: 1947 (age 78–79)
- Education: College of the Holy Cross (BA); University of Virginia (JD)

John T. Broderick Jr. (born 1947) is an American lawyer who served as an associate justice of the New Hampshire Supreme Court from 1995 to 2004 and as its chief justice from 2004 to 2010.

Broderick has also been involved with a number of professional organizations over the years. From 1985 to 1990, he was a member of the Board of Directors of the New Hampshire Bar Association. In 1993, he became a member of the Board of Directors of the Legal Services Corporation, and the Board of Advisors of the Institute for the Advancement of the American Legal System (IAALS) from 2007 to 2015. He has also been a member of the American Law Institute since 2007.

== Early life and education ==
In 1965, Broderick graduated from Wakefield Memorial High School, in Wakefield, Massachusetts, where his father, John T. Broderick Sr., worked as an assistant headmaster. He then graduated from the College of the Holy Cross with a Bachelor of Arts, magna cum laude, and earned his Juris Doctor (J.D.) from the University of Virginia School of Law.

== Career ==
In 1972, Broderick began working for the Chair Litigation Department of the law firm Devine, Millimet, Stahl & Branch, which is today the Devine, Millimet & Branch, Professional Association. In 1989, he took a job at the Merrill & Broderick, Professional Association, which would later become the Broderick & Dean, Professional Association.

From 1990 to 1991 he served as president of the New Hampshire Bar Association.

Early in his career, Broderick was a litigator for the Democratic Party. He also served as co-chair for Bill Clinton's 1992 presidential campaign in New Hampshire. In 1995, he was appointed as an associate justice of the New Hampshire Supreme Court by long-time associate and then-Governor Steve Merrill.

In 2000, Broderick became an adjunct professor to the Tuck School of Business at Dartmouth College. He would continue in this role until 2010.

In 2001, following his involvement in an investigation of David A. Brock, Broderick was accused of involving himself in negotiations on behalf of Brock. The New Hampshire Senate later ruled that Broderick had not committed any ethics violations.

In 2004, Broderick was appointed Chief Justice of New Hampshire Supreme Court, elevated from Associate Justice, where he would serve until retirement in 2010.

From 2010 to 2015, Broderick was the dean of the Franklin Pierce School of Law at the University of New Hampshire. During this period, he started the Warren B. Rudman Center for Justice, Leadership & Public Service.

In 2016, after become chair of the mental-health non-profit organization Change Direction's New Hampshire division, he also became Senior Director of External Affairs for Dartmouth Health, a position he still holds as of September 2025.

The New Hampshire Youth Development Center (YDC) was a juvenile delinquency detention facility that was shut down after being replaced by the Sununu Youth Services Center in the 1990s. It later came out that the YDC had sexually abused several children. A Claims Administration and Settlement Fund Administration (CASFA) was set up to oversee paying settlements to YDC abuse victims. The New Hampshire Supreme Court appointed Broderick as its full-time administrator in 2022. In 2024, the maximum value of settlement payouts was raised.

In April 2025, the New Hampshire legislature began an audit of the CASFA, which Broderick was initially okay with. In June, governor of New Hampshire Kelly A. Ayotte approved a bill placing her in charge of hiring or firing the CASFA administrator. Lawyers representing YDC abuse victims immediately filed for a lawsuit against the state government over this, with the aim of keeping Broderick in charge, but it didn't work. James P. Gray, representing the New Hampshire Senate, asked Broderick to step down as the CASFA administrator, which Broderick refused to do. The New Hampshire Senate's Finance Committee later amended the structure of the CASFA later in June, removing the position of administrator entirely. He was allowed to continue working for the CASFA in a different position, but lacked the power to approve or deny settlement claims. As a result, Broderick stepped down in July, as he no longer had the authority to make decisions. Despite officially resigning, he later stated "I didn’t resign; they took my job away.". He was paid two years salary as compensation, despite previous assurances from the state government that he would remain in charge until the year 2032.

== Mental health awareness ==
John T. Broderick's son, John Christian Broderick was born circa 1972. Looking back, Broderick believes his son began developing mental health issues at age thirteen, but didn't recognize it at the time. His son began smoking in high school, despite maintaining high grades, and later developed alcoholism issues shortly after enrolling in college. In August 2000, his son moved back into his parents' condo in Manchester, New Hampshire, intending to work on a master's degree. Broderick and his wife, Patricia, tried to get their on to go to rehab, but it didn't work. In October, they told their son that he had eight months to move out. This resulted in a physical altercation between Broderick and his son. Broderick was charged with assault for this, though the charges were later dropped. They did eventually kick their son out for a brief period of time, but both later regretted the decision, believing it worsened the pre-existing mental health issues. Broderick later called this "the single worse decision of my lifetime".

In 2002, his son, still living with his parents, assaulted his father, in the middle of the night while he slept. His son was arrested the next day, charged with assault, and sentenced to seven and a half to fifteen years in prison. He was released after only three years. At psychiatrist from the New Hampshire Department of Corrections later diagnosed his son with severe depression and anxiety. Broderick and his wife blame themselves for the incident, not their son. In March 2019, Broderick said his son had recovered and moved on with his life, marrying and having a child.

Since then, Broderick began advocating for mental health awareness. In 2016, he became chair of the mental-health non-profit organization Change Direction's New Hampshire division. He also started the R.E.A.C.T. Awareness Campaign, (Note: R.E.A.C.T. stands for "Recognize signs of emotional suffering; Express concern and offer support; Act now and talk to someone you trust; Care enough to follow through and follow up; and Text signs") where he has since traveled around New England giving speeches to high school students to raise awareness of mental health issues. He has since been a guest speaker for TED, the National Alliance on Mental Illness, the American Foundation for Suicide Prevention, and more. This campaign is sponsored by Dartmouth Health, where he served as Senior Director of Public Affairs. In 2022, he called it "the most meaningful work I have ever done in my whole life". In 2019, the State of New Hampshire began distributing physical R.E.A.C.T. cards to law enforcement officers, to assist in identifying mental health disorders.

== Positions ==
Broderick was highly critical of the restructuring of the CASFA, and Ayotte, believing it was unfair for those looking to receive settlements, would inconvenience people, and cost the state more money, calling it "a shameful betrayal". After losing his job, he called it "immoral", saying that he wanted his job back.

Broderick has authored a number of opinion pieces in recent years, sharing his stances on various topics.

In a May 2021 opinion piece for the Portsmouth Herald, following the conclusion of the 2020 United States presidential election, he was highly critical of Donald Trump's refusal to accept electoral loss. The article repeatedly calls Trump's false claims of election interference "THE BIG LIE".

Broderick has stated in several instances that he supports abortion rights.

In a 2023 TED Talk, he attributed worsening mental health to increased socio-cultural stress, pressure to achieve, and constant interconnection through technology. He later expanded on this in an opinion piece for the New Hampshire Union Leader, stating his belief that young people are focusing too much on school grades and academic success, among other thing. He also states that as a child, he "benefited from the inefficient use of time".

In several opinion pieces for the New Hampshire Union Leader, Broderick has criticized recent political polarization in the United States, encouraging readers to keep disagreements peaceful. He describes himself by saying "I have been a lifelong Democrat but have voted for Republicans when I thought I should; when I thought they were the better candidate.". He was also somewhat critical if the assassination of Charlie Kirk in September 2025.

In a June 2024 opinion piece for the Concord Monitor and NH Business Review, Broderick stated he had lost respect for the Supreme Court of the United States. He expanded on this in an April 2025 opinion piece for The Portsmouth Herald, criticizing the increasing politicization of the Supreme Court. He advocated for returning to what he described as "fair and impartial justice", criticizing partisan-based appointments. The article also heavily called out Elon Musk's involvement in the federal government.

== Honors and Professional Recognition ==
- Fellow, American College of Trial Lawyers (1989)
- Best Lawyers in America, 1987 – 1995
- Perkins Bass Distinguished Visitor, Nelson A. Rockefeller Center for Public Policy and the Social Sciences, Dartmouth College (2015)
- Fellow, American Bar Foundation
- Lifetime Achievement Award, NH Business & Industry Association (2010)
- Fellow, New Hampshire Bar Association
- Honorary Fellow, New Hampshire Bar Association (2003)
- Justice William A. Grimes Award for Judicial Professionalism, New Hampshire Bar Association (2002 and 2010)
- L. Jonathan Ross Award for Outstanding Commitment to Legal Services for the Poor, New Hampshire Bar Association (2007)
- Wakefield Memorial High School Alumni Hall of Fame (2009)
- Guest of honor at the Third Annual Transparent Courthouse Award Dinner, (Note: The two prior recipients were Justice Sandra Day O’Connor and Chief Justice Christine M. Durham, Supreme Court of Utah.) Institute for the Advancement of the American Legal System, University of Denver (2009)
- Bill of Rights Award, American Civil Liberties Union of New Hampshire (2010)
- Distinguished Citizen Award, Daniel Webster Council of the Boy Scouts of New Hampshire (Note: now Scouting America New Hampshire) (2011)
- Frank Rowe Kenison Award, New Hampshire Bar Association (2011)
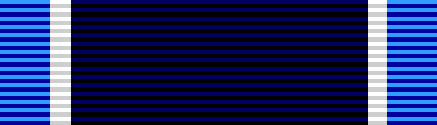
- President's Award for Distinguished Federal Civilian Service under Barack Obama (2011) (Note: presented by the New Hampshire Bar Association)
- Special President's Award, New Hampshire Bar Association (2015)
- Governor's Accessibility Award, State of New Hampshire's Commission on Disability (2016)
- Honorable Walter R Peterson Citizen Leader Award, Franklin Pierce University (2021)
- Warren E. Burger Society, National Center for State Courts (2023)

== Literature ==
- Backroads and Highways: My Journey to Discovery on Mental Health (2022), by John T. Broderick Jr.
