= The Sanatorium of the deported at Ikaria =

1999 book

- Author: Δημητρης Νταλιανης, Dimitris Dalianis, Born 1916 - Dead 2010
- Original title: 1948-1949 Το Σανατοριο εξοριστων Ικαριας, English title, 1948-1949 The Sanatorium of the deported at Ikaria
- Language: Greek
- Publisher: Ella Publisher, Larissa, and Alfeios Books, Athens, Greece, respectively
- Publication date: 2012
- Publication place: Greece
- Pages: 108
- ISBN: 978-960-6679-26-1

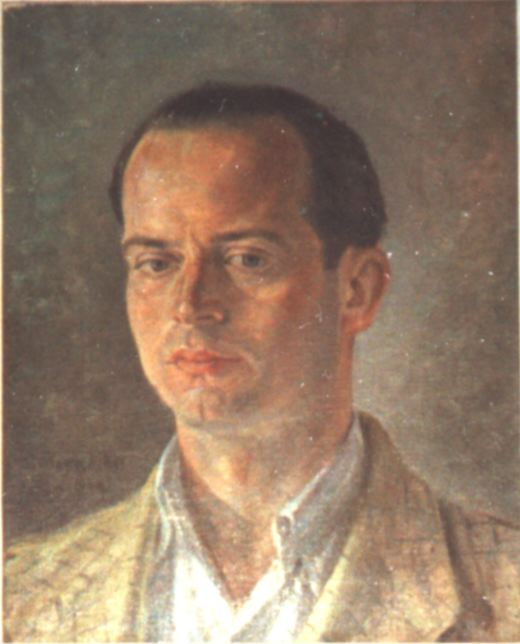
Portrait of Dimitri Dalianis, Ikaria 1948, painted by the artist Dimitri Megalidis, TB-sick exiled prisoner that also recovered.

The Sanatorium of the deported at Ikaria, original title in Greek 1948 to 1949 Το Σανατοριο εξοριστων Ικαριας, is a book written by the physician Dimitris Dalianis published in 1999 with a second edition in 2012. Both editions are in Greek from the publishers Ella Publisher, Larissa and Alfeios Books, Athens, Greece, respectively.

The book is about a sanatorium created by Greek political exile prisoners in Greece during the Greek Civil War, 1947–1949, on the island of Ikaria, in the Aegean Sea.

== Background ==
In October 1944 the Greek mainland was liberated from the Germans and Italians and the occupiers left Greece. (The Germans held out another year in the Greek islands). The Greeks who had fought against the occupying forces were organized in the resistance movement ELAS, which was a Communist-led, but where a wide spectrum of Greeks from different political colors were represented. There was another resistance movement, EDES, also that was a nationalist resistance movement. The British and the Russians supported the resistance movement. There were also Greeks who supported the occupiers, the so-called collaborators.

Partisans from the resistance movement had liberated most of Greece when the British occupied the major cities. The Greek government and the Greek army returned from Cairo, where they had gone into exile in the beginning of the war to escape the German forces. After their return, conflict started between the government backed by the British and ELAS and the Greek government in major cities in Greece on who would rule in Greece after the war. It was agreed that democratic elections would be held.

In Varkiza just outside Athens a meeting was held and the parties agreed that the resistance would hand in their weapons and free elections would be held, known as the Treaty of Varkiza, that was signed on 12 February 1945. Western forces worried that Stalin and the Soviet Union would gain influence in Greece. A civil war started with leftist partisans in the mountains against the British-aided government.

== Island of Ikaria ==
Ikaria is located 142 nautical miles east of Athens, close to the Turkish coast. The island is 225 km², with roughly 8000 inhabitants. One curiosity is that it belongs to one of the five so-called blue zones in the world where people are getting very old. One of three Ikaria islanders gets older than 90 years.. The island was named Ikaria from the mythological figure Icarus who along with his father, the inventor Daedalus made wings to fly with of feathers and pasted them together with wax. His father warned Icarus to fly too close to the sun because the wax will melt and Icarus will crash. The son did not listen to his father and crashed near the island and then the island became named Ikaria.

== The Book: The Sanatorium of the deported at Ikaria ==
Dimitris Dalianis (the author) was arrested in the spring of 1948, in Athens for illegal left winged activities together with several thousand other supporters of ELAS. Several of these were shipped off into exile to remote islands to be more easily controlled and to not join the partisans in the mountains who fought against the government. During the Greek civil war 1947-1949 it is estimated that over 10.000 political prisoners were exiled at the island of Ikaria.

Dimitris Dalianis was shipped in July 1948 from Pireus on a ship that contained 120-150 political prisoners who were to be deported to Ikaria. They were handcuffed in pairs for not escaping. The guards were armed with submachine guns. Suddenly a major storm starts and Dimitris Dalianis became very worried that the ship would be wrecked and they would all drown. He noted that the handcuffs he had was a little too large for his arm wrist and that if he pressed his hand through he might be free. He succeeded with great effort and great pain push himself free, his hand was bleeding and had a very sore hand. Suddenly a prisoner became ill and unconscious, someone called out - "A doctor, quick." Dimitris Dalianis ran over there and could successfully make the prisoner conscious again, finally the captain gave orders that all prisoners' handcuffs were opened, as there was a risk that the boat would be wrecked in the storm and he did not want the responsibility that they drowned handcuffed. After a day on the boat, they arrived at the port city Evdilos on the island of Ikaria. The prisoners were housed there for overnight accommodation. After a few days, he meets the person responsible for exiled prisoners. The commander, who was a young attorney said. - "Dr. Dimitris Dalianis I have an important mission for you, I heard you've been tuberculosis (TB) doctor at Sotiria hospital in Athens during the entire occupation, and have very good knowledge about the treatment of TB."

There are many tuberculosis sick exile prisoners in poor condition with high fever and coughing blood here on the island. They have been isolated in a deserted monastery named Panagia tou Monte (Παναγιά του Μουντέ).] We do not want them to infect other prisoners, the islanders or the guards. The commander was only interested in isolating the sick prisoners to not become infected themselves, not of therapy to make the sick prisoners healthy.

From Evdilos they went to the monastery first with a small boat and then by foot to the nearby village Raches and then with a mule to the monastery itself. The monastery was in a miserable condition, the roof leaked, there were no doors and windows, the sick, the prisoners lay directly on the floor and was in very poor condition. When they saw Dr. Dimitris Dalianis and found out that he would take care of them began their faces shine with hope. They knew that they had been left at the monastery to die, and now perhaps they could get treatment and have a chance to survive.

Dimitris Dalianis was ordered to check up the presence of all the prisoners twice a day. The authorities feared that the prisoners would escape and join the partisans on Ikaria or on the nearby island of Samos, where the civil war was still raging.

Dimitris Dalianis consulted the local doctor Dr. Tsantiri in the nearby village of Raches and quickly realized that they needed to get medical equipment and extra rations of food because tuberculosis patients, first of all, needed good nutrition to survive and be healthy. Dimitris Dalianis managed to arrange that the Red Cross send condensed milk and rice to the sick prisoners.

The commandant of the island told Dimitris Dalianis that he would take care of the sick prisoners himself. Dimitris Dalianis protested that he could not take care of 60 sick prisoners himself. He needed help from more staff. The commandant said he could not get it. To get more staff Dimitris Dalianis solved it clever by calling in sick healthy prisoners who he knew had medical knowledge, including several professional nurses and a medical student Vasilis Leoutsakos and some strong young prisoners who could help with all the heavy work at the sanatorium needed to be done as chopping wood, cooking, repairing the broken monastery, tight roof, repair windows and doors and woodwork furniture, including beds that were missing. Dimitris Dalianis knew it was very risky to take sick healthy prisoners, a doctor from Athens would quickly reveal him and he knew the consequences it could have. Torture, execution or at best in prison with even harsher regime.

=== Patient records ===
Dimitris Dalianis needed an archive to write up how the treatment is continued, one needed to write medical records but they had no paper to write on. Someone came up with the idea to use cigarette box paper. The journals began to be written in cigarette box paper. A few prisoners had their x-rays with them. The x-rays became part of the patient record.

=== Terror ===
Guards came by almost every day to count, torment and mistreat the sick prisoners. They used to ring the church bell so that the prisoners would gather and be counted but many were in such bad shape that they could not go themselves. Warders often attacked those who could walk and of course the staff who took care of the prisoners. One of the officers enjoyed torturing prisoners, especially those with higher education. In one occasion he started hitting Dr Dalianis with a club repeatedly, while shouting threats about executing him. Suddenly another officer says, "let me execute him", and takes him aside. He saved Dimitris Dalianis pretending to beat him and even firing one shot in the air. Dimitris survived but he was in very poor condition. Vasilis Leoutsakos, a medical student, writes in a chapter in the book that even after many years, when he hears church bells ringing, he gets the chills because the sound reminds him of the beatings by the guards.

=== Vasilis Leoutsakos, the medical student ===
Vasilis Leoutsakos, the medical student, writes a chapter in the book where he describes Dimitris Dalianis charisma and enthusiasm that all patients be lit up, thinking they will survive their TB under these bad conditions. Vasilis Leoutsakos learns a lot during this time and thanks to Dimitris Dalianis French medical books manages to complete his medical training in 16 months when he finally gets released. Later, he becomes a professor of surgery in Athens.

=== Treatment of TB at the sanatorium ===
In addition to the hygiene-dietetic treatment, which meant rest and nutritious food, one used pneumothorax as a treatment. Pneumothorax, also called atelectasis, collapse therapy or fumigation of a patient's lungs, is meant to allow air into the pleura. The tuberculosis bacteria need oxygen to survive. When one removes the oxygen the bacteria have difficulties to cope, the lung had a rest, and the patient was able to fight the TB. Dimitris Dalianis needed a pneumothorax machine but such was not to find on the entire island of Ikaria, Dimitris Dalianis managed to smuggle out a letter to his wife Mando Dalianis who was in Athens (and had not yet been imprisoned) to arrange that Dimitris Dalianis pneumothorax machine would be sent to the island. Unfortunately, Mando Dalianis did no get the unit sent to Ikaria. Dimitris Dalianis used then instead of a large syringe, partly to puncture the pleura of patients and also suck out pus from the pleura. As tube, he used the sounds hose from his stethoscope.

The situation in the sanatorium was very primitive. There was no furniture and the patients lay directly on the floor. But thanks to the treatment and slightly better food several patients became better. Fighting TB was also a question of psychology. But suddenly something very terrible happened, the syringe broke. Dimitris Dalianis became despondent, he had no other syringe except two very small syringes but they could not be used. The prisoners saw the despair on his face several patients became worse when they could not be emptied of each. Someone came in to use a reed (kalami, καλαμι, καλαμι, the Greek firm, heavy variety, almost like bamboo) cut into and assembled to create the vacuum and suck out pus. It worked with some difficulty and treatment of the patients were able to continue successfully. Patients fever disappeared, they stopped coughing blood and was feeling better. During dr. Dimitris Dalianis time as head of the sanitarium none of the patients died. Of the total of 120 patients treated at the sanatorium, only five patients died during treatment. These five deceased patients are buried next to the monastery, one of the deceased is unknown, where it says XΕΝΟΣ, ΞΕΝΟΣ unknown or stranger in Greek.

Dimitris Dalianis and his staff did not sleep in the sanitarium because of the risk of infection, but in a detached storage room with two small rooms some distance away. Patients lay together in various convent cells in the monastery, depending at what stage of TBC they had. Those who had some advanced TB was in the same convent cell and those with more severe TBC was in another convent cell, and so on.

The monastery was located in a beautiful place, but not far from the village Raches. A forest near the monastery was harvested for wood to repair the monastery's roof, windows, and doors—and also to make primitive beds. In the beginning, the prisoners lay directly on the floor, but then made the beds. They made the base of twigs of various thickness and the mattresses of ferns. They had no sheets, and so used blankets, bags, and quilts. Near the monastery was also a river where they washed and washed clothes. Dimitris Dalianis and his colleagues had to organize cooking, baking of bread, transportation of food, everything had to be done on site because it was too far to transport the ready food on the mule.

Vasilis Leuotsakos describes in his chapter, he marvelled, and was very moved by that some patients with only one functioning lung helping chop and carry wood. All that could were trying to help.

=== Heating the sanatorium ===
In the winter it was very cold, they had managed to seal the roof, repair the windows and the doors. Several of the prisoners were carpenters, masons and were skilled craftsmen. They had been given a saw and some tools by the villagers in the adjacent village Raches. The villagers helped as much as they could even though it was dangerous to do so and the patient-prisoners helped with what they could. They had no heating. Someone got the idea to use the cans that were left over from the canned milk. Normally the cans were warmed up directly on a fire to get warm milk. But the heat from the fire made the cans joints made of tin melting, this made it possible to bang out the cans into flat pieces that were 15–20 cm high, then bowed to the edges so that it could engage in the next piece, a large scissors was also used to cut the metal pieces, and then they got what looked like a bucket that was open at the top. The stove and the seams were sealed with clay. On the open hole at the top, one put an aluminium plate that you could heat a soup or some herbal tea. The stove was keeping the heat perfectly in winter.

=== Musical instruments ===
Also described in the book is the manufacturing of various musical instruments, a guitar, balalaika and mandolin. The playing on this instruments along with songs kept the spirits up in exile prisoners.

=== Aftermath ===
Dimitri Dalianis was honoured in 1964 with the Greek Red Cross Medal for his efforts in the Greek resistance movement during the occupation of Greece during World War II and in 1983 by The Medical Association of Athens.
