= Jean K. Burling =

American attorney

Justice of the New Hampshire Superior Court
- In office 1973–2008

Personal details
- Citizenship: American
- Spouse: Peter Burling (politician)
- Children: Jonathan Burling
- Occupation: Judge, attorney
- Known for: First female judge in New Hampshire

Jean K. Burling is an American attorney and former judge. She was the first woman to be a judge in the state of New Hampshire. She served as a justice of the New Hampshire Superior Court for several decades, including on the Grafton County bench, before retiring in 2008.

== Early life and education ==
Born in Gardner, Massachusetts, Burling earned her bachelor's degree from Wellesley College. She then received a juris doctor from Boston University School of Law in 1973. Burling was the 47th woman admitted to practice law in New Hampshire.

== Legal career ==
From 1974 to 1979, Burling operated under her own law practice in Plainfield, New Hampshire. The same year, she became New Hampshire's first female judge. She served as a superior court justice on the New Hampshire Superior Court of Grafton County. Citing health reasons, she retired on January 1, 2008.

== Philanthropy ==
Burling is a co-founder of the court-supervised program, Drug Court in Grafton County. The program was intended to support offenders in breaking the cycle of addiction. She was also named a member of the Sullivan County Battered Women's Resource Group.

== Personal life ==
Together with her husband, Peter, Burling has a son, Jonathan and lives in Cornish, New Hampshire.

== See also ==
- List of first women lawyers and judges in New Hampshire
