= Peter Burling (politician) =

American politician

Peter Hoe Burling

Member of the New Hampshire Senate

Member of the U.S. House of Representatives from 's 5th district
- In office 2004–2008
- Preceded by: Clifton Below
- Succeeded by: Matthew Houde

Member of the New Hampshire House of Representatives
- In office 1988–2004

Personal details
- Born: February 5, 1945 (age 81) Washington, D.C., U.S.
- Party: Democratic
- Spouse: Jean K. Burling
- Education: Harvard University (BA, JD)
- Profession: Attorney
- Known for: Longtime New Hampshire legislator, Democratic Party activist

Peter Burling is a Democratic former member of the New Hampshire Senate, representing the 5th District since 2006. He was a member of the New Hampshire House of Representatives between 1988 and 2004 and served in the New Hampshire Senate representing the 5th District from 2004 to 2008. During his legislative career, Burling was involved in state policy on education, environmental issues, and governmental reform.

== Career ==
Burling began his tenure in the New Hampshire House of Representatives in 1988, holding office across multiple non-consecutive terms until 2004. From 2004 to 2008, he served in the New Hampshire Senate, representing the 5th District.

During his term, Burling was involved in legislative work on education policy, environmental protection, and state governance reform. He also participated in Democratic Party organizational activities at the state and national level, including serving as a member of the Democratic National Committee.

In May 2008, Burling announced that he would not seek re-election in the State Senate and would instead retire at the end of his term. be running for Senate. However, he will serve as a member of the Democratic National Committee, as he was recently elected to a four-year term.

== Personal life ==
Burling is married to retired Justice of the New Hampshire Superior Court, Jean K. Burling. Together, they have a son, Jonathan.

New Hampshire House of Representatives
Preceded by Sara M. Townsend	Member of the New Hampshire House of Representatives from the 1st Sullivan district 1988–1994; Served alongside: Merle W. Schotanus (1988–1992)	Succeeded by Sandra Stettenheim
Preceded by Sandra Stettenheim	Member of the New Hampshire House of Representatives from the 1st Sullivan district 1996–2002	Succeeded by Charlotte H. Quimby; Stephen G. Prichard (2004)
Preceded by Himself (2002)	Member of the New Hampshire House of Representatives from the 19th Sullivan district 2002–2004; Served alongside: Constance A. Jones	Succeeded by district abolished
New Hampshire Senate
Preceded by Clifton Below	Member of the New Hampshire Senate from the 5th district 2004–2008	Succeeded by Matthew Houde
