= Mando Dalianis =

Greek physician

Mando Adamandia Dalianis-Karambatzaki (Μαντώ Νταλιάνη-Καραμπατζάκη; 1920–1996) was a Greek physician, psychiatrist and researcher.

== Biography ==
=== Early years ===
Mando Dalianis was born in Asia Minor in the Ottoman Empire in the village Palladari (Παλλαδάρι), outside of the city Prussa, today's Bursa, in what today is western Turkey. She fled as a two-year-old child during the Minor Asia Catastrophe in 1922 with her parents to Thessaloniki and Greece, where she grew up. She was a very diligent student both in elementary school and in high school. Mando wanted to study medicine and applied to the School of Medicine in Athens, which was the only place in Greece that had medicine at that time. Dalianis was admitted to the school in 1938, but due to that her mother became sick and she had to take care of her and also due to the German occupation of 1941–1944 her studies were delayed and she finalized her studies in medicine in 1947 and became a physician. In September 1945, she married Dimitris Dalianis (Δημήτρης Νταλιάνης), also a physician, whom she had met during her medical studies at Sotiria Hospital in Athens.

=== Prison ===
After the Second World War and during the following the Greek Civil War in 1946-1949 she was accused for illegal left wing activities and was arrested and on April 13, 1949 put in the Averoff prison (Φυλακές Αβέρωφ, demolished in 1971) in Athens. The Averoff prison was a women's prison where women were allowed to bring their children if they were below two years old. Since Mando was a medical doctor she was assigned to take care of the women's and also the children's health at the prison. She was released after 21 months without any charges.

=== Work as a psychiatrist and research ===
In 1955 Mando moved with her family to England and in 1960 to Sweden. She worked as a child psychiatrist at PBU (Psykiatriska Barn- och Ungdomsvården), (Psychiatric Child and Youth Clinics) in Södertälje and then in Märsta, Sweden and finally in 1980 with democracy starting in Greece she could trace down her inmates and their families and interview them about their life as parents that were imprisoned. Mando A. Dalianis interviewed over 143 mothers and their families, spouses, children, grandchildren, all together almost 1,000 persons. In 1994 she defended her dissertation with the title Children in Turmoil during the Greek civil war 1946-49: today's adults : a longitudinal study on children confined with their mothers in prison at Karolinska Institute, Stockholm, Sweden. Soon after in 1996 Mando died and the book with the title After the War Was Over: Reconstructing the Family, Nation, and State in Greece edited by Mark Mazower was published that contains a summary of Mando Dalianis dissertation in a historical perspective.

Dalianis's dissertation was translated to Greek in 2009 with the Greek title Παιδιά στη Δίνη του Ελληνικού Εμφυλίου Πολέμου 1946-1949, Σημερινοί Ενήλικες. and presented at a ceremony at Benaki Museum on February 16, 2010. All the interviews are now digitized and available for research at the Historical archives of the Benaki Museum after proper application for research and ethical permission.

== Sources ==
- Children in Turmoil during the Greek civil war 1946-49: today's adults : a longitudinal study on children confined with their mothers in prison, A. Mando Dalianis-Karambatzakis, Karolinska Institute, Stockholm, ISBN 91-628-1281-5, 1994
- After the War Was Over: Reconstructing the Family, Nation, and State in Greece, 1943-1960 Edited by Mark Mazower, Princeton University Press, 2000
- Video: Τις δυσκολίες που βρήκε η Μ. Νταλιάνη για να μπορέσει να συναντήσει τις συγκρατούμενές της από τις φυλακές Αβέρωφ περιγράφει ο σύζυγός της, Δ. Νταλιάνης., 2010
- SVT Sveriges Television (Sweden's Television) Mosaik, 1996 on YouTube
