= Impeachment in New Hampshire =

In New Hampshire, impeachment is an expressed Constitutional power of the House of Representatives to bring formal charges against a state officer for "bribery, corruption, malpractice or maladministration, in office." Upon the impeachment of a state officer, the Senate acts as "a court, with full power and authority to hear, try, and determine, all impeachments made by the house of representatives." Upon conviction, the Senate can impose a punishment that "does not extend further than removal from office, disqualification to hold or enjoy any place of honor, trust, or profit, under this state."

Unlike at the Federal level where an impeachment conviction requires 2/3 of the United States Senators present to vote in the affirmative, the New Hampshire Constitution does not mention the burden of proof needed to impeach or convict an official, thus each house is left to decide the standard it will use.

== Impeachment law ==
=== Impeachment in the House ===
The New Hampshire House of Representatives has the sole authority to investigate and then determine whether or not to impeach a state official. The grounds for impeachment are found in Part II, Articles 17 and 38 of the New Hampshire Constitution.

Part II. Article 17. [House to Impeach Before the Senate.] states:

The house of representatives shall be the grand inquest of the state; and all impeachments made by them, shall be heard and tried by the senate.

Part II. Article 38. [Senate to Try Impeachments; Mode of Proceeding.] states in part:

The senate shall be a court, with full power and authority to hear, try, and determine, all impeachments made by the house of representatives against any officer or officers of the state, for bribery, corruption, malpractice or maladministration, in office; ...

The House may conduct its investigation in any manner it chooses. At the conclusion of its investigation the House votes on the "articles of impeachment" specifying the grounds on which the official's impeachment is based. The House determines the level of evidence required to impeach and the number of votes necessary to pass the "articles of impeachment." Upon the passage of the articles of impeachment the Senate then acts as a court to conduct an impeachment trial.

=== Trial in the Senate ===
Part II. Article 38. sets out the mode for the Senate to hold an impeachment trial.

==== Pretrial ====
For the purposes of judging the articles of impeachment, the Senate is a court and has the authority to "issue summons, or compulsory process, for convening witnesses before them." Prior to the impeachment trial, the members of the senate are required to be "sworn truly and impartially to try and determine the charge in question, according to evidence." The standard of the evidence required to convict nor a percentage of the members voting is stated in the Constitution nor in the Senate Rules.

The article also requires that every officer impeached "shall be served with an attested copy of the impeachment, and order of the senate thereon with such citation as the senate may direct, setting forth the time and place of their sitting to try the impeachment." This service is required to be made by "the sheriff, or such other sworn officer as the senate may appoint, at least fourteen days previous to the time of trial." After the "citation being duly served and returned" the Senate may proceed in the hearing of the impeachment.

==== Trial ====
At trial, the Senate is required to give the impeached person "full liberty of producing witnesses and proofs, and of making his defense, by himself and counsel." Should the impeached person refuse or neglect to appear, the Senate may hear the proofs in support of the impeachment and is permitted to render its decision the same as if the person had appeared and made their case during the trial. The Senate on its own determines whether there is sufficient evidence to convict and the required affirmative vote for conviction.

== Impeachments ==
In the history of the state, only two officials have been impeached, both judges. In 1790, Justice Woodbury Langdon was impeached for neglecting his duties, but resigned after the trial was delayed. In 2000, Chief Justice David A. Brock was impeached by the House on four counts of maladministration or malpractice, and knowingly lying under oath. Brock was later acquitted by the Senate on a vote of seven to convict and fifteen for acquittal, with two-thirds of the twenty-four members needed for conviction.

== See also ==
- Impeachment by state and territorial governments of the United States
- Impeachment in the United States
