= Linda Dalianis =

American judge

Chief Justice of the New Hampshire Supreme Court
- In office December 15, 2010 – April 9, 2018
- Appointed by: John Lynch
- Preceded by: John T. Broderick Jr.
- Succeeded by: Robert Lynn

Personal details
- Born: October 1, 1948 (age 76)
- Education: Northeastern University (BA); Suffolk University (JD)

Linda Stewart Dalianis (born October 1, 1948) is the former Chief Justice of the New Hampshire Supreme Court and the first woman to serve on that court.

== Background ==
Linda Stewart Dalianis is a 1974 graduate of Suffolk University Law School in Boston where she received her Juris Doctor degree. Prior to attending Suffolk Law, she graduated from Villa Augustina School in 1966 and Northeastern University in 1970. After graduation from Suffolk, Dalianis worked in private practice in Nashua until 1979 when she became marital master of the Superior Court. Dalianis became the first woman appointed to the New Hampshire Superior Court in 1980, the first female chief justice of the Superior Court in 2000 and then the first female Supreme Court justice also in 2000. In December 2010 Dalianis was elevated to chief justice.

In November 2017, Dalianis announced she would retire from the court effective April 1, 2018, due to the mandatory retirement age of 70 years under the New Hampshire Constitution.

== See also ==
- List of female state supreme court justices
- List of first women lawyers and judges in New Hampshire

Legal offices
Preceded by John T. Broderick Jr.	Chief Justice of the New Hampshire Supreme Court; 2010–2018	Succeeded by Robert Lynn
