= W. Stephen Thayer III =

American judge (born 1946)

Justice of the New Hampshire Supreme Court
- In office 1986–2000

Personal details
- Born: January 13, 1946 (age 80)
- Party: Republican
- Spouse: Lisa Dean
- Education: Belmont Abbey College
- Occupation: United States Attorney

Walter Stephen Thayer III (born January 13, 1946) was a justice of the New Hampshire Supreme Court from 1986 to 2000.

He was the United States Attorney for the District of New Hampshire from 1981 to 1984. He is a member of the Republican Party and participated in several conservative organizations.

In 2000, he resigned from the New Hampshire Supreme Court amid a controversy involving claims that he attempted to influence a decision of the court regarding his bitterly contested divorce from his wife Judith, former chairwoman of the New Hampshire State Board of Education.

Thayer said his resignation was involuntary because he was left with no other alternative. He said he resigned because the media had damaged his credibility through stories about his failure to disclose a $50,000 loan from a Manchester lawyer on a bank loan application. "How much was I supposed to put up with? I can't sit on the bench and be expected to fulfill my constitutional duties when I was being dragged through the mud on federal felony bank charges," he said.

In 2003, he was appointed by the Bush administration to participate in an effort to establish more comprehensive screening process for airline passengers.
