= Marilla Ricker =

American lawyer (1840–1920)

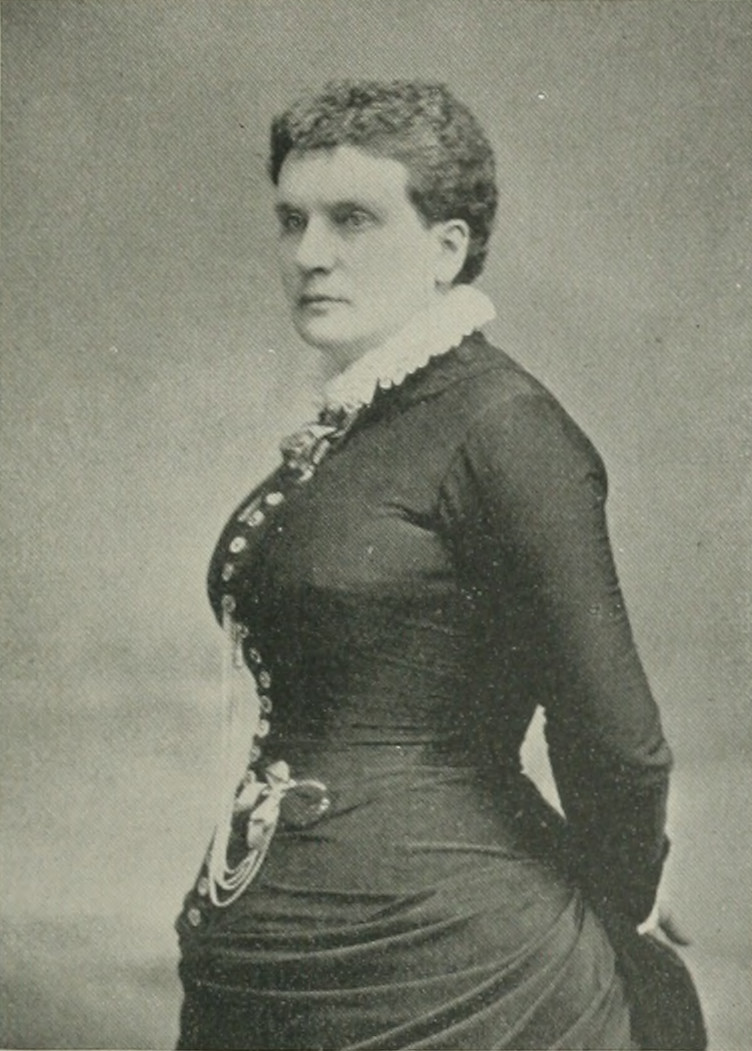
- Portrait photo from A Woman of the Century
- Born: Marilla Marks Young; March 18, 1840; New Durham, New Hampshire
- Died: November 12, 1920 (aged 80); Dover, New Hampshire
- Education: Colby Academy
- Occupations: Lawyer, politician
- Spouse: John Ricker (m. 1863; died 1868)

Marilla Marks Ricker (née Young; March 18, 1840 – November 12, 1920) was an American suffragist, philanthropist, lawyer, and freethinker. She was the first female lawyer from New Hampshire, United States, and she paved the way for women to be accepted into the bar in New Hampshire. She was also the first woman to run for governor in that state, and the first woman to apply for a federal foreign ambassadorship post. She made significant and lasting contributions to the issues of women's rights and irreligion through her actions and her writings.

== Early life ==
Marilla Marks Young was born on March 18, 1840, in New Durham, New Hampshire. Her mother, Hannah D. (Stevens) Young, was a devoted Free Will Baptist, and her father, Jonathan Young, was a freethinker. Jonathan taught her to think independently and to be curious, taking her to town meetings and courtrooms. She was educated at Colby Academy in New London, New Hampshire.

During Sundays in the summer, Marilla would accompany her father to the family farm to perform practical activities. This demonstrated an explicit rejection of the values of her mother's church concerning the Sabbath. At the age of ten, she later wrote, Marilla attended a "fiery" Baptist sermon about hell, after which she averred she would never attend such a church again: "Do you wonder that I, a child of ten years, said to my father, who was a freethinker, infidel, atheist, or whatever else you please to call him: 'I hate my mother's church. I will not go there again.'"

During the Civil War, Marilla offered her services as a nurse for the Union Army, but she was turned down due to her lack of medical training. Her only brother's death during the fighting, she later recalled, was her "first real sorrow". Indeed, "it did more towards checking her exuberant spirit than all else, in fact she says the world has always seemed a little different ever since." As she could not tend to the wounded soldiers, Ricker devoted as much time and money as she could to sending clothes and other goods to aid the war effort.

== Adult life ==
By the time of the war – and indeed since the age of sixteen – she had become a teacher in local schools in the towns of Lee and Dover. She refused to read from the Bible during class, preferring instead the literary works of Emerson. The school committee approached Ricker and informed her that she was required to read from the Bible in class. Ricker refused to hide her freethought beliefs, and left the teaching profession.

In 1863, Marilla Young married John Ricker, a man 33 years her senior. She became a widow, however, five years later. The inheritance left to her by John made her financially independent. Unfortunately, very little is known about John Ricker. It seems likely that he was a freethinker and a supporter of women's rights, as she later wrote: "Give me then the man who is not a Christian, and who has no religion, for if the man who loves his wife and children, who gives to them the strength of his arm, the thought of his brain, the warmth of his head, has not religion, the world is better off without it, for these are the highest and holiest things which man can do."

In 1872, Ricker travelled to Germany and remained in Europe until 1876. The reasons for this excursion are unknown. Biographers disagree on what she accomplished on her travels, suggesting that she either engaged with European freethought movements or simply wanted to learn new cultures and languages. All Ricker tells us is that she "became conversant with the outside doings of the Roman Catholic Church."

Upon her return to Washington, D.C., she decided to study law (read law). In a remarkably short time, she gained prominence as a competent and compassionate member of the profession. Ricker worked on the famous Star Route trial with Robert Ingersoll – perhaps the United States' most well-known agnostic. Ricker's legal career was also bound up with her freethought. In a losing cause, Ricker attempted to remove Washington's old Sunday law requiring shops to close in observance of the Sabbath.

During her career as a lawyer, Ricker became a strong advocate of prisoners' rights, and later received the nickname "the prisoner's friend". In 1879, she sought a hearing to protest the conditions in state prisons. The Boston Globe praised her charity, noting that she "spent her entire income, beyond the actual necessary expenses of her personal maintenance, in these noble efforts." She made especial efforts to represent accused individuals who could not afford legal help, very often charging no fees to her clients.

When Ricker applied, in 1910, to run for governor of New Hampshire, and when she applied, in 1897, for the position of ambassador to Colombia, she had no realistic hopes of being granted these posts. Rather, she was attempting to bring public attention to the fact that women were systematically excluded from positions for which they were equally qualified as men. "Whether I secure the appointment or not," she said of her ambassadorship application, "I have established a precedent in asking for it." She justified her application in explicitly egalitarian terms: "there is no gender in brain, and it is time to do away with the silly notion that there is."

She died in Dover, New Hampshire, on November 12, 1920.

== Ideologies: Women's rights and freethought ==
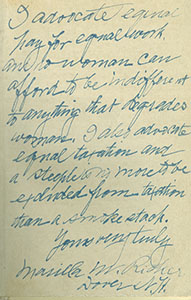
Inscription by Marilla Ricker in a copy of The Four Gospels. The inscription reads: "I advocate equal pay for equal work, and no woman can afford to be indifferent to anything that degrades women. I also advocate equal taxation and a steeple is no more to be excluded from taxation than a smoke stack."

In 1869, the year after her husband's death, Ricker attended the first National Woman Suffrage Association convention, organized by Elizabeth Cady Stanton and Susan B. Anthony. This marked a new period of active suffragist work in her life.

Explicitly asserting her belief in the equality of all peoples, Ricker acted upon these beliefs by attempting to vote in her hometown of Dover, New Hampshire, in 1870 – the first woman to do so. She continued to hand in her ballot for consecutive decades until the end of her life. Ultimately, she was willing to "tackle anything" for woman suffrage, "from a buzz saw to a bishop." Religion was, for Ricker, the ideological source of gender inequality in American society. "Let come what will come," she wrote, "no man, be he priest, minister or judge, shall sit upon the throne of my mind, and decide for me what is right, true, or good."

Freethinking suffragists believed that the interference of religion in the effort to obtain the vote for women would delay or even prevent the movement from achieving its goal. Thus, Ricker wrote, "I wish the ministers would keep out of the woman suffrage movement. They do more harm than good. Why, things have come to this pass, that at every meeting of women in behalf of suffrage some minister opens the meeting with prayer; in the middle of discussion there is another prayer; and then at the close of deliberations you hear a third prayer. No wonder the men laugh and call the meetings of woman suffragists' prayer meetings."

Annie Laurie Gaylor has argued in her collection of writings by female freethinkers that "the women's movement has not acknowledged the debt it owes to the unorthodox, freethinking women in its ranks. Their non-religious views often have been suppressed, as if shameful, when in fact repudiation of patriarchal religion is an essential step in freeing women." Indeed, "the status of women and the history of the women's rights movement cannot be understood except in the context of women's fight to be free from religion ... if there was one cause which had a logical and consistent affinity with freethought, it was feminism."

== Freethought author ==
During the 1910s, Ricker remained in New Hampshire and, perhaps due to failing health, concentrated on publishing articles and books elucidating her freethought beliefs. Much of her writing focused upon the detrimental influence of the church on society. Not only did the churches own more than "13 billions" of property, on which they were too "dishonest" to pay taxes, they also were responsible for pervasive inequality and the fact that "human freedom is but half won."

Ultimately, her publications extolled the goals toward which she had been working for her entire life: "I am a freethought missionary, and I am doing my 'level best' to drive superstition, alias Christianity, from the minds of mankind."

Ricker often wrote the same phrase in the front of her books, especially those that she donated to libraries: "A steeple is no more to be excluded from taxation than a smoke stack." Her books included I'm Not Afraid, Are You?, The Four Gospels, and I Don't Know, Do You?

== See also ==
- List of first women lawyers and judges in Michigan
