= New Hampshire Supreme Court =

Highest court in the U.S. state of New Hampshire

- State Seal of New Hampshire
- Interactive map of New Hampshire Supreme Court
- 43.211667°N 71.521111°W
- Established: 1841
- Jurisdiction: New Hampshire
- Location: Concord, New Hampshire
- Coordinates: 43.211667°N 71.521111°W
- Composition method: Appointment by the Governor with the advice and consent of the Executive Council of New Hampshire
- Authorised by: New Hampshire Constitution
- Appeals to: Supreme Court of the United States
- Judge term length: until age 70
- Number of positions: 5
- Website: Official website

Chief Justice
- Currently: Vacant

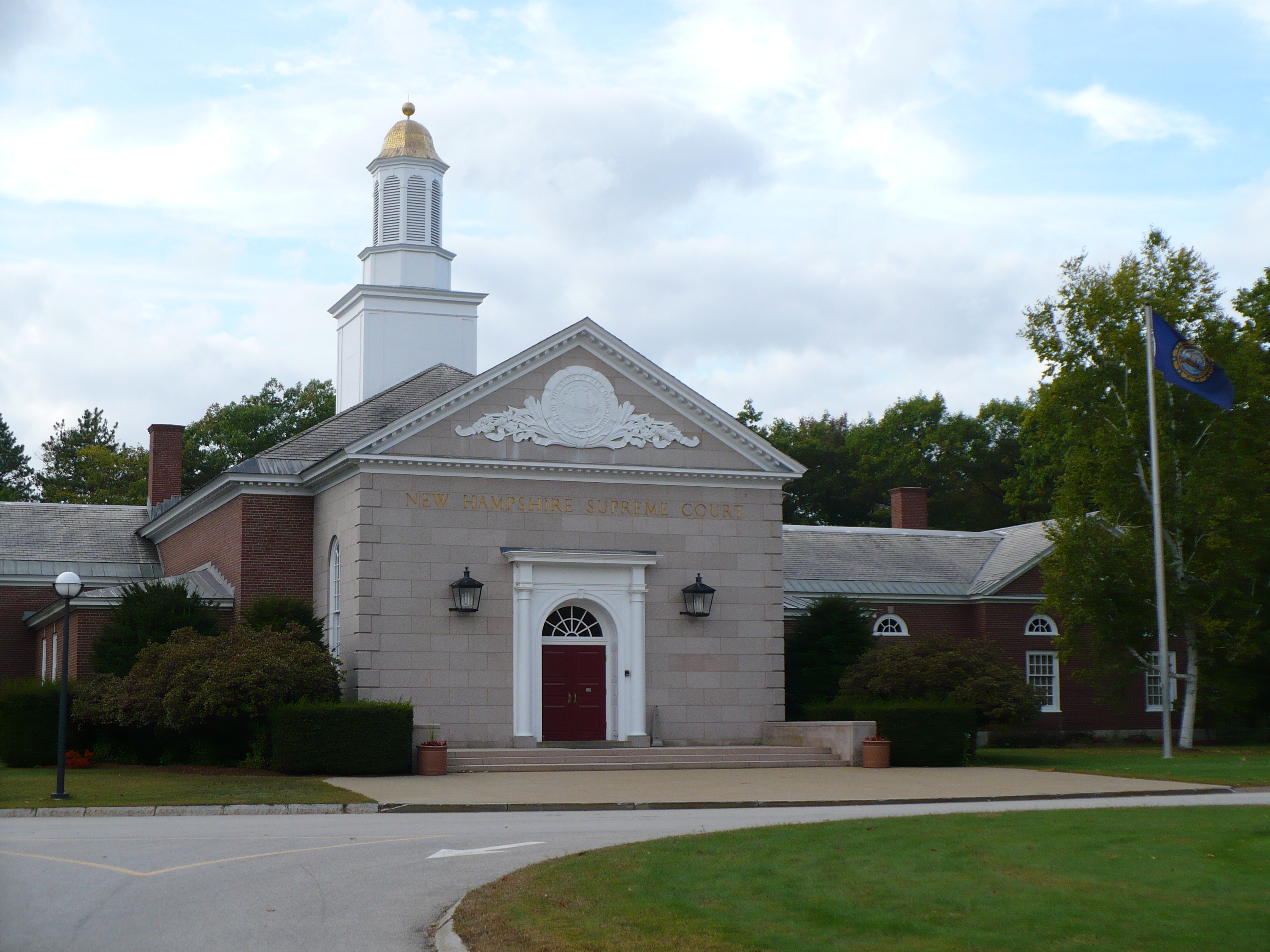
NH Supreme Court

The New Hampshire Supreme Court is the supreme court of the U.S. state of New Hampshire and sole appellate court of the state. The Supreme Court is seated in the state capital, Concord. The Court is composed of a Chief Justice and four Associate Justices appointed by the Governor and Executive Council to serve during "good behavior" until retirement or the age of seventy. The senior member of the Court is able to specially assign lower-court judges, as well as retired justices, to fill vacancies on the Court.

The Supreme Court is the administrative authority over the state's judicial system. The Court has both mandatory and discretionary appellate jurisdiction. In 2000, the Court created a "Three Judges Expedited" or 3JX panel to issue decisions in cases of less precedential value, with its decision only binding on the present case. In 2004, the court began accepting all appeals from the trial courts for the first time in 25 years.

From 1776 to 1876, the then four-member court was known as the "Superior Court of Judicature", until the name was changed by an act of the New Hampshire General Court. In 1901, the number of justices was increased from four to five. Two Supreme Court justices have been the only two state officials to be impeached in New Hampshire: Justice Woodbury Langdon resigned prior to his trial in 1790, and Chief Justice David Brock was acquitted by the New Hampshire Senate in 2000.

Retired Associate Justice David Souter of the Supreme Court of the United States served on the New Hampshire Supreme Court from 1983 to 1990.

== History ==
The Colony of New Hampshire adopted the temporary 1776 Constitution. The newly formed legislature abolished the existing executive courts made up of the governor and council, and established the "Superior Court of Judicature" as the appellate court with four justices. The Court follows the common law and since Tomson v. Ward (1816) has published official law reports of its precedential opinions. In 1876, an act was passed creating the "Supreme Court" as New Hampshire's highest court.

In 1901, the legislature established two courts to take the place of the existing Supreme Court. Jurisdiction over "law terms" during which court decisions were appealed, was given to the Supreme Court, which was made up of a chief justice and four associate justices. Matters formerly handled at "trial terms" were given to the Superior Court. The advantage was a separate appeals court, of which the trial judge was not a member.

In 1966, the state constitution was amended to establish the Supreme Court and Superior Court as constitutional courts, which means that they could only be changed or abolished by a constitutional amendment, not by the legislature.

In 1971, the General Court established by statute a "Unified Court System," making the Chief Justice of the Supreme Court responsible for the efficient operation of all the courts in New Hampshire. The law stated the Supreme Court Chief Justice will have the advice and consent of the Chief Justice of the Superior Court. It also required both to seek cooperation from others interested in the administration of justice including other justices and judges, court clerks, the court accreditation committee, the state and local bar associations, and the judicial council. The 24-member Judicial Council is an ongoing, independent forum for consideration and discussion of issues involving the administration of justice.

In 1978, New Hampshire voters approved the addition of Part II, Article 73-a, a constitution amendment to the constitution making the Chief Justice the administrative head of the court and giving the Judicial Branch greater control over itself.

In 1983, the General Courts consolidated funding for all the state courts into the state's biennial budget. This abolished the prior practice of the superior and probate courts funded by the counties and the district courts by the cities and towns in which they were located. The Office of Administrative Services, now known as the Administrative Office of the Courts, was established. The office consolidated functions such as personnel, accounting, technology and budgeting into one central office for the Judicial Branch.

In May 2000, the Supreme Court announced the creation of a new Judicial Conduct Commission (JCC) that would be totally independent of the court system and have its own staff, office space, and funding. The Judicial Conduct Commission took the place of the prior Judicial Conduct Committee, which the court had created in 1977. In 2004, RSA Chapter 494-A came into effect codified the JCC as being completely independent of the New Hampshire court system and other branches of government. The legislature effectively left the rules the JCC intact, except where they contradicted the RSA Chapter 494-A. The Supreme Court took an appeal, Petition of the Judicial Conduct Commission (2004), from the JCC that RSA chapter 494-A was unconstitutional because it purported to authorize the JCC to impose disciplinary action on judges. The court ruled that the legislature had violated the separation of powers doctrine (Part I, Article 37) by encroaching on the power of the Supreme Court to regulate the conduct of the judiciary, by giving such power to the commission.

== Jurisdiction ==
NH Supreme Court Cases: FY 2003, 2004
Caseload Summary	2003	2004
Pending and reinstated cases*	389	346
New filings	842	898
Total	1,231	1,244
Dispositions	893	721
Pending cases*	338	523
Cases accepted	347	645
Disposition of Cases	2003	2004
Written Opinion	186	151
Declined	317	99
Summary Affirmance	99	28
Withdrawn	58	69
Orders After Argument	115	198
Denied/Dismissed	65	126
Others	53	50
* At year's end

The court hears a variety of cases, most of which are either mandatory or discretionary appeals from the lower courts. In January 2004, the court began accepting all appeals from the trial court for the first time in 25 years. Below, fiscal year caseload statistics are shown for the Family Divisions, District Courts, Probate Courts and the Superior Courts in the 2003 and 2004 fiscal years show this change.

=== Mandatory appeals ===
The Supreme Court has jurisdiction to review appeals from the State trial courts and from many State administrative agencies. For many years, the Court did not accept every appeal from the lower courts. In 2003, the court only accepted 40 percent of the appeals. In January 2004, the Supreme Court instituted mandatory appeals on the final decisions on the merits from the Family Division and the District, Probate and Superior Courts, under Supreme Court Rule 7. In mandatory appeals, the parties generally are given the opportunity to submit a transcript of the lower court proceedings and to file written briefs. After the briefs are filed, the Supreme Court decides if the case will be decided after oral argument or on the briefs alone. The court will then issue a final decision in the form of a brief order, an order with some explanation, or a full written opinion.

=== Discretionary appeals and original jurisdiction ===
Conditions which make the aforementioned appeals discretionary are: a post-conviction review proceeding; a proceeding involving the collateral challenge to a conviction or sentence; a sentence modification or suspension proceeding; an imposition of sentence proceeding; a parole revocation proceeding; or a probation revocation proceeding. On September 7, 2005, the Supreme Court adopted a temporary addition to the exceptions to mandatory appeals, adding appeals from a final decision on the merits issued in a landlord/tenant action or in a possessory action, both under RSA Chapter 540. Administrative appeals, interlocutory appeals and interlocutory transfers, and certain limited appeals from the decisions of the trial courts are also discretionary appeals. The court also has original jurisdiction to issue writs of certiorari, prohibition, habeas corpus and other writs, which the court has discretion to decide which cases to hear. If a discretionary appeal is accepted, it typically follows the same process as a mandatory appeal.

=== Three Judges Expedited (3JX) ===
In December 2000, the Supreme Court instituted a Three Judges Expedited (3JX) summary procedure to reduce cases requiring oral argument. The 3JX panel consists of three justices who hear shortened arguments of cases containing less precedential value. A unanimous judgement of all three justices is necessary for the panel to issue an Order binding only the present case, it contains no precedential value. A split decision of the 3JX panel will cause a case to be rescheduled for oral argument in front of all five justices.

== Organization ==
The court is made up of a chief justice and four associate justices. Currently the members of the court are Senior Associate Justice Patrick E. Donovan, Associate Justice Melissa Beth Countway, Associate Justice Bryan K. Gould, and Associate Justice Daniel Will. As of September 15, 2026, the role of chief justice is vacant pending nomination and confirmation of a successor to Gordon J. MacDonald.

=== Appointment ===
Part II, Article 46 of the state constitution, states all judicial officers (among the other constitutional officers) shall be nominated and appointed by the Governor and Executive Council. It also states that such nominations shall be made at least three days prior to such appointment and no such appointment shall take place unless a majority of the council agrees.

=== Length of tenure ===
Part II, Article 73 of the state constitution states all judicial officers shall hold their offices during good behavior, unless the constitution states otherwise. Part II, Article 78 limits judges of any court from holding court once that judge has reached the age of seventy years.

=== Assigning replacement justices ===
According to RSA 490:3, when a justice of the Supreme Court has retired, is disqualified, or is unable to sit on a case, the chief justice or senior associate justice of the supreme court may assign a justice of the supreme court who has retired from regular active service. If a retired supreme court justice is unavailable, a justice of the superior court who has retired from regular active service shall be continuously assigned to fill a vacancy. The selection of a retired supreme or superior court justice shall be on a random basis. However, if neither a retired supreme or superior court justice is available, then the selection of a replacement justice shall be made on a random basis from a pool of full-time justices of the superior court, then from a pool of full-time justices of the district and probate courts.

Justices assigned to sit temporarily on the Supreme Court have all the authority of a Supreme Court justice to hear arguments, render decisions and file opinions. However, no justice shall be assigned to sit on the Supreme Court in the determination of any cause or matter upon which the justice has previously sat or for which such justice is not otherwise disqualified nor without the justice's own consent.

== Current justices ==
Name	Born	Start	Mandatory retirement	Appointer	Law school
Patrick E. Donovan, Acting Chief Justice	May 8, 1964 (age 62)	May 8, 2018	May 8, 2034	Chris Sununu (R)	Boston College
Melissa Beth Countway	1970 or 1971 (age 54–55)	January 2, 2024	2040/2041	Chris Sununu (R)	UNC
Bryan Gould	1958 or 1959 (age 67–68)	September 18, 2025	December 2, 2028	Kelly Ayotte (R)	Utah
Daniel Will	1966 or 1967 (age 59–60)	March 4, 2026	2036/2037	Kelly Ayotte (R)	Boston College
Vacant		September 15, 2026			

=== Vacancy and pending nomination ===
Vacator	Reason	Vacancy Date	Appointee	Announcement Date
Gordon MacDonald	Resignation	September 15, 2026	Pending	TBD

== Impeachment of justices ==
The state constitution provides two methods for removing judicial officers, based on who is bringing such action:

- Part II, Article 73 also states that the Governor with consent of the Executive Council may remove any commissioned officer for reasonable cause upon the address of both houses of the legislature; that the cause for removal shall be stated fully and substantially in the address and shall not be a cause which is a sufficient ground for impeachment; and provided further that no officer shall be so removed unless he shall have had an opportunity to be heard in his defense by a joint committee of both houses of the legislature.
- Part II, Article 17 states, "The house of representatives shall be the grand inquest of the state; and all impeachments made by them, shall be heard and tried by the senate." Part II, Article 38 provides the grounds for impeachment as bribery, corruption, malpractice or maladministration. The article also provides the framework and requirements for how the Senate will conduct such an impeachment trial.

=== Justice Woodbury Langdon in 1790 ===
In 1790, the first impeachment trial of a Supreme Court justice was commenced against Judge Woodbury Langdon from Portsmouth, a brother of Governor John Langdon. The House of Representatives voted 35–29 to impeach him for neglecting his duties; finding that he had failed to attend sessions of the Supreme Court in outlying counties and that charging the legislature had failed to provide an honorable salaries for judges and interfered in court decisions. The removal trial in the Senate was postponed, but never took place as Langdon resigned from the court.

=== Chief Justice David A. Brock in 2000 ===
On March 31, 2000, State Attorney General Philip T. McLaughlin issued a report entitled "In re: W. Stephen Thayer, III and Related Matters," which brought to light information raising concerns about the conduct of justices of the Supreme Court. The key to the investigation was an unsigned memo, attributed to Supreme Court Clerk Howard Zibel, which was delivered to the Attorney General by Brock's personal lawyer. The Zibel memo detailed ethical violations by members of the Supreme Court witnessed by the author; which surrounded the conduct of Justice W. Steven T. Thayer III in the Feld's Case and the appeal of Thayer v. Thayer (his own divorce) and resulted in the criminal investigation of Thayer, which resulted in Thayer resigning to avoid prosecution.

On April 9, 2000, the House voted 343 to 7 to approve HR 50 authorizing and directing the House Judiciary Committee "to investigate whether cause exists for the impeachment of David A. Brock, chief justice, and/or any other justice of the New Hampshire Supreme Court" and to report to the House "such resolutions, articles of impeachment, or other recommendations that it deems proper."

The committee conducted its investigation and it proposed the House adopt HR 51, "A RESOLUTION recommending impeachment of supreme court chief justice David A. Brock," which is authored. The committee found by clear and convincing evidence that there were constitutional grounds for impeachment and subsequent removal if Brock was found to have committed all or any of the four articles of impeachment. The four articles charged Brock with:

1. Maladministration or malpractice in connection with the case of Home Gas Corp. v. Strafford Fuels, Inc. and Edward C. Dupont;
2. Maladministration or malpractice in connection with the case of Thayer v. Thayer by engaging in ex-parte communications;
3. Knowingly testifying falsely under oath to the house judiciary committee with the intention of hindering the HR 50 investigation;
4. Maladministration by permitting and overseeing a practice whereby recused and disqualified justices were enabled to comment on and influence opinions in the cases from which they were recused and disqualified.

The committee sent two resolutions to the House, HR 52 and HR 53 respectively, recommending that no article of impeachment be brought against Supreme Court justice Sherman D. Horton, Jr. or justice John T. Broderick, Jr. On July 12, 2000, the House debated the articles of impeachment against Brock. Representatives voted by simple majority, 253 to 95, to impeach Brock on all four charges and sent the case to the Senate for trial. The House voted to accept the committee's recommendation that Horton (187 to 134) and Broderick (176 to 144) not face impeachment.

The state constitution does not provide for the level of evidence required to determine whether such conduct is impeachable, or the number of votes required to convict, unlike the U.S. Constitution. The Senate conducted a three-week trial and ultimately acquitted Brock of all charges, finding the charges were not serious enough to warrant impeachment or that the evidence presented at trial was not persuasive. The Senate chose to require a two-thirds vote to convict, but let each senator to decide for themselves if the evidence rose to the level of finding Brock was "guilty" of the articles of impeachment. Fifteen senators were needed for a conviction, only seven voted to convict and fifteen voted to acquit.

== Committees of the court ==
The court has four committees that advise it on the administration of the judicial branch: The Advisory Committee on Rules, the Advisory Committee on Judicial Ethics, the Judicial Conduct Committee and Attorney Discipline System.

- The Advisory Committee on Rules, made up of 14 members from the court system and public, receives and considers suggestions for changes to the rules governing the court's system.
- The Advisory Committee on Judicial Ethics provides advisory opinions on appropriate rules of court and statutes relating to the ethical and professional conduct of judges, and such advice would be evidence of good faith if they were to be disciplined.
- The Committee on Judicial Conduct was created by the court to inquire into and investigate alleged misconduct on the part of any judge, master, referee, court stenographer or reporter, or court clerk or deputy clerk, including registers of probate and any persons performing the duties of a clerk or register. The committee consists of three judges, a clerk of court, two lawyers, and five lay persons. The committee may issue a warning, dispose of a grievance against a judge by informal agreement or adjustment, or recommend that the court impose formal discipline.
- A new Attorney Discipline System went into effect on January 1, 2004, and was designed to improve the effort to protect client rights and guarantee lawyers a full and fair evaluation of complaints against them. The system is composed of the Attorney Discipline Office, a Complaint Screening Committee, Hearings Committee and Professional Conduct Committee.

== Notable cases ==
=== Attorney General ===
- Bokowsky v. State & a., 111 N.H. 57 (1971) – The New Hampshire Attorney General has authority to enter a nolle prosequi in prosecutions initiated by public officials or by private persons.

=== Civil rights ===
- In the Matter of Molly Blaisdell and Robert Blaisdell, No. 2020-0211 (2021) – The state's definition of adultery, which includes only intercourse between a married person and another person of the opposite sex, must be expanded to include same-sex intercourse in light of the legal and societal shift surrounding same-sex marriage.

=== Educational funding ===
- Claremont School Dist. v. Governor, 138 N.H. 183 (1993) (Claremont I) – the state has a constitutional obligation to provide and pay for an adequate education for all New Hampshire children.
- Claremont School Dist. v. Governor, 142 N.H. 462 (1997) (Claremont II) – adequate education is a fundamental right, then-current system of funding education unconstitutional, state's definition of an adequate education unconstitutional.
- Claremont School Dist. v. Governor, 142 N.H. 737 (1998) (Claremont III) – motion to vacate the Claremont II decision because of Justice Batchelder's age.
- Claremont School Dist. v. Governor, 143 N.H. 154 (1998) (Claremont IV) – court denies state's request for a two-year extension to comply with Claremont II's order to develop a constitutional method of funding education.
- Opinion of the Justices, 142 N.H. 892 (1998) – tax abatement provisions of Governor Shaheen's ABC plan unconstitutional
- Opinion of the Justices, 143 N.H. 429 (1999) – tax plan referendum unconstitutional
- Claremont School Dist. v. Governor, 144 N.H. 210 (1999) (Claremont V) – phase-in of statewide property tax unconstitutional
- Claremont School Dist. v. Governor, 144 N.H. 590 (1999) (Claremont VI) – award of attorney's fees
- Opinion of the Justices, 145 N.H. 474 (2000) – Fred King plan to fund part of educational adequacy unconstitutional
- Claremont School Dist. v. Governor, 147 N.H. 499 (2002) (Claremont VII) – state's constitutional obligation includes standards of accountability and current state standards unconstitutional

=== Judicial review ===
- Merrill v. Sherburne, 1 N.H. 204 (1819) – the Supreme Court of Judicature ruled the General Court's practice of passing bills to give people new trials in certain cases unconstitutional; the practice was common during the American Revolution, but was only done on a case-by-case basis post-Revolution.

=== Online publication ===
- The Mortgage Specialists, Inc. v. Implode-Explode Heavy Industries, Inc., 160 N.H. 227 (2010) – The court found that Internet news outlets should be treated as traditional print media and receive the same legal privileges granted to journalists.

=== Reasonable doubt ===
- State v. Wentworth, 118 N.H. 832 (1978) – prescribed a model charge for trial judges to instruct a jury on the issue of reasonable doubt, which was upheld by the U.S. Court of Appeals for the First Circuit in Tsoumas v. State of New Hampshire, 611 F.2d 412 (1980).
- State v. Aubert, 120 N.H. 634 (1980) – the court reversed a conviction which used an alternate reasonable doubt instruction, the court indicated that trial judges should not depart from the Wentworth instruction.

=== U.S. Supreme Court cases ===
- Chaplinsky v. State of New Hampshire, 315 U.S. 568 (1942) – the U.S. Supreme Court created the "fighting words" exception to the First Amendment to the United States Constitution.
- Sweezy v. New Hampshire, 354 U.S. 234 (1957) – citing the Due Process Clause of the Fourteenth Amendment, the U.S. Supreme Court reversed the affirmation of a contempt finding against a "subversive person" who refused to answer questions about his activities to the Attorney General and subsequently refused in the State Superior Court.

== Notable justices ==
There have been five governors and six Attorneys General of New Hampshire and two Associate Justices of the US Supreme Court who have served as either an Associate Justice or Chief Justice.

- Josiah Bartlett, delegate to the Continental Congress for New Hampshire, a signer of the Declaration of Independence, 4th Governor of New Hampshire
- Meshech Weare, 1st President of New Hampshire
- John Dudley, Speaker of the New Hampshire House of Representatives from 1782 to 1783
- Jeremiah Smith, 6th Governor of New Hampshire
- William King Atkinson, Attorney General of New Hampshire from 1807 to 1812
- Samuel Bell, 8th Governor of New Hampshire from 1819 to 1823, US Senator from 1823 to 1835
- Levi Woodbury, Associate Justice of the US Supreme Court in 1845 remained there until his death in 1851, Secretary of the Treasury from 1834 to 1841, Secretary of the Navy from 1831 to 1841, 9th Governor of New Hampshire from 1823 to 1825 and Speaker of the New Hampshire Assembly in 1825, US Senator from 1825 to 1831 and 1841 to 1845
- Francis Wayland Johnston, Attorney General of New Hampshire from 1932 to 1935
- Frank R. Kenison, Attorney General of New Hampshire from 1940 to 1942
- Stephen Morse Wheeler, Attorney General of New Hampshire from 1942 to 1944
- John W. King, 71st Governor of New Hampshire from 1963 to 1969
- David Souter, Associate Justice of the US Supreme Court from 1990 to 2009, Attorney General of New Hampshire from 1976 to 1978
- Peter Woodbury, Judge, Chief Judge and Senior Judge of the United States Court of Appeals for the First Circuit (1941-1970)
- Gordon J. MacDonald, Attorney General of New Hampshire from 2017 to 2021

== See also ==
- List of New Hampshire state courts by town
- List of justices of the New Hampshire Supreme Court

== Notes ==
See
