= Branch (surname) =

Branch is a surname that may refer to:

- Brian Branch (born 2001), American football player
- Bruce Branch (American football) (born 1978), American football player
- Bruce Branch III (born 2008), American basketball player
- Christopher Branch (circa 1600–1682), early American colonist
- Cliff Branch (1948–2019), American football player
- David Branch (fighter) (born 1981), American mixed martial arts fighter
- David Branch (ice hockey) (1948–2026), Canadian ice hockey administrator
- Ethel Branch, American attorney and politician
- Emmett Forest Branch (1874–1932), governor of the U.S. state of Indiana
- Frank Branch (1944–2018), Canadian politician
- Graham Branch (born 1972), English footballer
- John Branch Jr. (1782–1863), U.S. Senator, Secretary of the Navy, governor of North Carolina, and territorial governor of Florida
- Lawrence O'Bryan Branch (1820–1862), Confederate General and Representative from North Carolina
- Michael Branch (academic) (1940–2019), British linguist
- Michael Branch (footballer) (born 1978), English footballer
- Mike Branch (born 1965), American politician
- Michelle Branch (born 1983), American singer, songwriter and guitarist
- Oliver Ernesto Branch (1847–1916), American politician
- Oliver Winslow Branch (1879–1956), associate justice of the New Hampshire Supreme Court
- Pamela Branch (1920–1967), British crime novelist
- Samuel Branch (1861–1932), Anglican priest
- Thomas H. Branch (1856–1924), American Seventh-day Adventist missionary
- Vanessa Branch (born 1973), British actress and model
- William B. Branch (1927–2019), American playwright
- William Roy Branch (1946–2018), British herpetologist
- Winston Branch (born 1947), British artist, originally from Saint Lucia
- Zachariah Branch (born 2004), American football player

== See also ==
- Justice Branch (disambiguation)
- Branch (disambiguation)
- Branche, a surname
