= Branch (disambiguation) =

A branch is a part of a woody plant.

Branch or branches may also refer to:

== Places ==
=== Australia ===
- The Branch River, New South Wales

=== Canada ===
- Branch, Newfoundland and Labrador, a town

=== France ===
- Branches, Yonne, a commune

=== New Zealand ===
- Branch River (Taylor River tributary)
- Branch River (Wairau River tributary)

=== United States ===
- Branch, Arkansas, a city
- Branch, Louisiana, an unincorporated community and census-designated place
- Branch, Michigan, an unincorporated community
- Branch, Missouri, an unincorporated community
- Branch, Texas, an unincorporated community
- Branch, Wisconsin, an unincorporated community
- Branch, Branch County, Michigan, a former village and first seat of the county
- Branch County, Michigan
- Branch Township (disambiguation)
- Fort Branch, North Carolina, a Confederate fort in the American Civil War
- Branch River (New Hampshire)
- The Branch, also known as Branch River, New Hampshire
- Branch River (Rhode Island)
- Branch River (Wisconsin)

== People ==
- Branch (surname), a list of people with the name
- Branch (given name), a list of people with the name
- Branch McCracken (1908–1970), American college basketball player and coach nicknamed "Branch"

== Arts and entertainment ==
- Branch Connally, a main character in the Longmire television series
- Branch, a troll in the 2016 film Trolls
- Arthur Branch, a fictional district attorney in the Law & Order franchise
- Branches (novel), a 2000 novel-in-verse by American author Mitch Cullin
- The Branches, a 2010 EP by The Dear Hunter

== Companies and organizations ==
- Branch office, business organization that, unlike a subsidiary, does not constitute a separate legal entity even if physically separated from the organization's main office
- Branch (banking), a retail location
- Branch, a local union, in the trade union movement
- Military branch, a component of the armed forces, such as the army, navy, or air force

== Mathematics ==
- Branches of mathematics, subdisciplines within mathematics
- Branch (algebraic geometry), a smooth arc of a real algebraic curve
- Branch (graph theory), a path of degree-two vertices ending in vertices of degree unequal to two
  - Branch-decomposition, a hierarchical clustering of the edges of a graph, and branchwidth, a graph parameter defined from these decompositions
- Branch (mathematical analysis), a single value of a multi-valued complex function
  - Branch point, of a multi-valued function, a point where all neighborhoods are multi-valued
  - Branched covering, a generalization of multi-valued functions in topology and algebraic geometry
- Branch (set theory), a maximal totally ordered subset of a tree-ordered set

== Religion ==
- Branch (LDS Church), the smaller of two types of local congregation in The Church of Jesus Christ of Latter-day Saints
- Branch, in Jesus and messianic prophecy, a prophetic name attributed by Christians to Jesus

== Other uses ==
- Branch (academia), an academic sub-discipline
- Branch (bridle), a crooked piece of iron in a bit shank
- Branch (computer science), a point in a computer program where program-flow may change depending on a condition
- Branch (hieroglyph), a member of the trees and plants hieroglyphs
- Branches, the major sub-families of a language family
- USS Branch, various US Navy ships
- Branch, a sometimes-used taxonomic rank

== See also ==
- Branching (disambiguation)
- Branch line, a relatively minor railway line
- Branč
- Branche, a surname
- East Branch (disambiguation)
- North Branch (disambiguation)
- South Branch (disambiguation)
- West Branch (disambiguation)
- Long Branch (disambiguation)
