= South Branch Township, Michigan =

South Branch Township may refer to:

- South Branch Township, Crawford County, Michigan
- South Branch Township, Wexford County, Michigan

== See also ==
- South Branch, Michigan, an unincorporated community in Goodar Township, Ogemaw County, Michigan
- South Branch Township (disambiguation)
