= West Branch Township, Michigan =

West Branch Township may refer to the following places in the U.S. state of Michigan:

- West Branch Township, Dickinson County, Michigan
- West Branch Township, Marquette County, Michigan
- West Branch Township, Missaukee County, Michigan
- West Branch Township, Ogemaw County, Michigan

== See also ==
- West Branch, Michigan, a city in Ogemaw County
- West Branch Township (disambiguation)
