= West Branch =

West Branch may refer to:

== Communities ==
- West Branch, Iowa, city in Cedar and Johnson counties
- West Branch, Michigan, city in Ogemaw County
- West Branch, New Brunswick, in the Local Service District of Weldford Parish
- West Branch River John, in Pictou County, Nova Scotia
- West Branch Township (disambiguation)

== Streams ==
- West Branch Brandywine Creek, tributary of Brandywine Creek in Pennsylvania
- West Branch Carrabassett River, tributary of the Carrabassett River in Maine
- West Branch Chillisquaque Creek, tributary of Chillisquaque Creek in Pennsylvania
- West Branch Dead Diamond River, tributary of the Dead Diamond River in New Hampshire
- West Branch Delaware River, tributary of the Delaware River in New York and Pennsylvania
- West Branch Dyberry Creek, tributary of Dyberry Creek in Pennsylvania
- West Branch Eastern River, tributary of the Eastern River in Maine
- West Branch Ellis River tributary of the Ellis River in Maine
- West Branch Feather River, tributary of Lake Oroville in California
- West Branch Handsome Brook, tributary of Handsome Brook in New York
- West Branch Laramie River, tributary of the Laramie River in Colorado
- West Branch Little Black River (Quebec–Maine), a tributary of the Little Black River in Quebec, Canada, and northern Maine, USA
- West Branch Little Dead Diamond River, tributary of the Little Dead Diamond River in New Hampshire
- West Branch Little Magalloway River, tributary of the Little Magalloway River in Maine and New Hampshire
- West Branch Machias River, tributary of the Machias River in Maine
- West Branch Mad River, tributary of the Mad River in New Hampshire
- West Branch Magalloway River, tributary of the Magalloway River in Maine and New Hampshire
- West Branch Mattawamkeag River, tributary of the Mattawamkeag River in Maine
- West Branch Mohawk River (New Hampshire), tributary of the Mohawk River in New Hampshire
- West Branch Moose River (Maine), tributary of the South Branch Moose River in Maine
- West Branch Narraguagus River (Cherryfield, Maine), tributary of the Narraguagus River in Maine
- West Branch Narraguagus River (Hancock County, Maine), tributary of the Narraguagus River in Maine
- West Branch (New Hampshire), tributary of Ossipee Lake
- West Branch Nezinscot River, tributary of the Nezinscot River in Maine
- West Branch Otego Creek, tributary of Otego Creek in New York
- West Branch Oyster River, tributary of the Oyster River in Maine
- West Branch Peabody River, tributary of the Peabody River in New Hampshire
- West Branch Penobscot River, tributary of the Penobscot River in Maine
- West Branch Pine Creek, tributary of Pine Creek in Pennsylvania
- West Branch Piscataquis River, tributary of the Piscataquis River in Maine
- West Branch Pleasant River (Piscataquis River), tributary of the Piscataquis River in Maine
- West Branch Schuylkill River, tributary of the Schuylkill River in Pennsylvania
- West Branch Sheepscot River, tributary of the Sheepscot River in Maine
- West Branch Souhegan River, tributary of the Souhegan River in New Hampshire
- West Branch Sugar River, tributary of the Sugar River in Wisconsin
- West Branch Susquehanna River, tributary of the Susquehanna River
- West Branch Swift River (Maine), tributary of the Swift River in Maine
- West Branch Tenmile River, tributary of the Tenmile River in Maine
- West Branch Trout Creek, tributary of Trout Creek in New York
- West Branch Unadilla River, tributary of Unadilla River in New York
- West Branch Union River, tributary of the Union River in Maine
- West Branch Upper Ammonoosuc River, tributary of the Upper Ammonoosuc River in New Hampshire
- West Branch Wading River, tributary of the Wading River in New Jersey
- West Branch Warner River, tributary of the Warner River in New Hampshire
- West Branch (Cayuga Inlet), a tributary of Cayuga Inlet in New York

== Other ==
- West Branch (journal), literary journal based at Bucknell University
- West Branch Area School District, in Clearfield County, Pennsylvania
  - West Branch Area Junior/Senior High School, part of the above school district
- West Branch Commercial Historic District, in Ohio
- West Branch High School, in Beloit, Ohio
- West Branch Reservoir, in Putnam County, New York
- West Branch State Park, in Ohio
- West Branch Susquehanna Valley, in Pennsylvania

== See also ==
- Branch (disambiguation)
- East Branch (disambiguation)
- North Branch (disambiguation)
- South Branch (disambiguation)
- West Long Branch, New Jersey
