= North Branch Township =

North Branch Township may refer to the following places in the United States:

- North Branch Township, Michigan
- North Branch Township, Isanti County, Minnesota
- North Branch Township, Pennsylvania

== See also ==
- Branch Township (disambiguation)
- South Branch Township (disambiguation)
- West Branch Township (disambiguation)
- North Branch (disambiguation)
