= East Branch =

East Branch may refer to:

- East Branch Delaware River, Delaware County, New York
- East Branch Handsome Brook, Delaware County, New York
- East Branch Township, Marion County, Kansas
- East Branch (Newtown Creek), estuary between the boroughs of Brooklyn and Queens, in New York City

== See also ==
- Branch (disambiguation)
- West Branch (disambiguation)
- North Branch (disambiguation)
- South Branch (disambiguation)
