= Branch Township =

Branch Township may refer to:

- Branch Township, Michigan
- Branch Township, Pennsylvania

== See also ==
- North Branch Township (disambiguation)
- South Branch Township (disambiguation)
- West Branch Township (disambiguation)
