= North Branch =

North Branch may refer to:

== Australia ==
- North Branch, Queensland (Southern Downs Region), a locality
- North Branch, Queensland (Toowoomba Region), a locality

== United States ==
=== Inhabited places ===
- North Branch, Kansas
- North Branch, Maryland
- North Branch, Michigan
- North Branch, Minnesota
- North Branch, New Jersey
  - North Branch (NJT station), a New Jersey Transit railroad station
- North Branch, New York
- North Branch, Wisconsin, an unincorporated community

=== Other U.S. topics ===
- North Branch (New York)
- North Branch River, a river in New Hampshire
- North Branch Basket Creek, a creek in New York
- North Branch Trail, a bicycle trail in Cook County, Illinois

== Canada ==
- North Branch, Newfoundland and Labrador
- North Branch, Glengarry County, Ontario
- North Branch, Rainy River District, Ontario
- North Branch Formation, a geologic formation in Yukon

== See also ==
- Branch (disambiguation)
- East Branch (disambiguation)
- North Branch Township (disambiguation)
- South Branch (disambiguation)
- West Branch (disambiguation)
- North River (disambiguation)
