= Ramification =

Ramification, from Latin for "branching", may refer to:

- Ramification (botany), the divergence of the stem and limbs of a plant into smaller ones
- Ramification (mathematics), a geometric term used for 'branching out', in the way that the square root function, for complex numbers, can be seen to have two branches differing in sign.
- Ramification group, filtration of the Galois group of a local field extension
- Ramification theory of valuations, studies the set of extensions of a valuation v of a field K to an extension L of K
- Ramification problem, in philosophy and artificial intelligence, concerned with the indirect consequences of an action.
- Tree (set theory), historically called a ramification system
- Type theory, Ramified Theory of Types by mathematician Bertrand Russell

== See also ==
- Branch, of a plant, also called a ramus
- Branching (disambiguation)
