= Rivière du Nord =

Rivière du Nord or Rivière-du-Nord (River of the north) may refer to:

== Streams ==
- Rivière du Nord (Laurentides), a tributary of the Ottawa River in the Laurentides region of Quebec, Canada
- Rivière du Nord (Hudson Bay), in the Hudson Bay watershed of Nunavik, Quebec, Canada
- Rivière du Nord (New Brunswick), a tributary of Caraquet Bay west of Caraquet, New Brunswick, Canada
- Rivière du Nord (Muskrat River tributary), in Chaudière-Appalaches, Quebec, Canada

== Communities ==
- Rivière-du-Nord, New Brunswick, Canada
- La Rivière-du-Nord Regional County Municipality, in the Laurentides region of Quebec, Canada
  - Rivière-du-Nord (electoral district), a Canadian federal electoral district

== See also ==
- North River (disambiguation)
