= North River =

North River may refer to:

== Canada ==
- North River, Newfoundland and Labrador, a town in Newfoundland
- North River, Labrador, Newfoundland and Labrador, a village in Labrador
- North River, Nova Scotia, a community
- North River (Ontario), various rivers
- North River, Prince Edward Island, a community in the town of Cornwall
- North River (Gabriel River tributary), Chaudière-Appalaches, Quebec

== United States ==
- North River (Alabama)
- North River (Darien River), Georgia
- North River (St. Marys River), Georgia
- North River (Iowa)
- North River (Maryland), tributary of the South River
- North River (Deerfield River), Massachusetts
- North River (Massachusetts Bay), Massachusetts
- North River (Michigan)
- North River (Minnesota)
- North River (Missouri), a waterway emptying into the Mississippi River
- North River, Missouri, an unincorporated community
- North River (New Hampshire)
- North River (Hudson River), the historical name for the lower Hudson River between New York and New Jersey
- North River, New York, a hamlet on the upper Hudson River
- North River (North Carolina), a tidal river
- North River, North Dakota, a city
- North River (Tennessee), a tributary of the Tellico River
- North River (Mobjack Bay), Virginia
- North River (Slate River), Virginia
- North River (South Fork Shenandoah River), Virginia
- North River (Washington)
- North River (Cacapon River tributary), West Virginia

== Elsewhere ==
- North River (China), one of the major tributaries of the Pearl River in Guangdong Province, China
- North River (Dominica)
- North River (New Zealand)

== See also ==
- North Branch (disambiguation)
- Rivière du Nord (disambiguation)
- Noord (river)
- Northern River (horse), a Japanese thoroughbred racehorse
- Northern River (painting)
