= North River (New Zealand) =

Stream in the Northland Region, New Zealand

Coordinates: 35°57′S 174°23′E

Location
- Country: New Zealand

Physical characteristics
- Mouth
  - location: Pohuenui River

North River is a locality in the Northland Region, New Zealand. The early European settlers in the area were Scottish immigrants from Nova Scotia and the eponymous river was named after the North River in Victoria county, on Cape Breton Island in Nova Scotia. North River School provided education to the area from 1860 to 1939. The local language would have been Gaelic when the school opened.

The North River itself flows through limestone caves before entering the Pohuenui River, which in turn flows into the Waipu River before this emerges into Bream Bay near Waipu. The North River lends its name to a locality and a forest.

Four species of native fish were found in the stream in a 1998 study – longfin eel (Anguilla dieffenbachii), short-finned eel (Anguilla australis), Cran's bully (Gobiomorphus basalis) and redfin bully (Gobiomorphus huttoni). There are also rainbow and some brown trout.
