= North Dickinson County Schools =

School district in Michigan, United States

Address
- W6588 State Highway M-69 Felch, Dickinson County, Michigan, 49831; United States

District information
- Grades: Kindergarten–12
- Superintendent: David Florenski
- Schools: 1
- NCES District ID: 2630480

Students and staff
- Students: 250 (2024–2025)
- Teachers: 16.09 (on an FTE basis) (2024–2025)
- Staff: 33.7 FTE (2024–2025)
- Student–teacher ratio: 15.54 (2024–2025)
- District mascot: Nordics

Other information
- Website: www.go-nordics.com

North Dickinson County Schools is a public school district in Dickinson County, in Michigan's Upper Peninsula. It operates North Dickinson School, a K–12 school located in Felch. It serves the townships of Breen, Felch, Sagola, and West Branch.

== History ==
On May 10, 1911, lightning struck several schools in Dickinson County during the school day. One student was killed inside the Felch School and two later died, and nine other students were severely injured. The school was destroyed. The school in Channing was also damaged by lightning.

North Dickinson School opened in 1972, a result of the merger of the Felch and Channing districts.

== Schools ==
The district operates a single K-12 school at W6588 State Highway M-69.
