= Boy =

Young male human

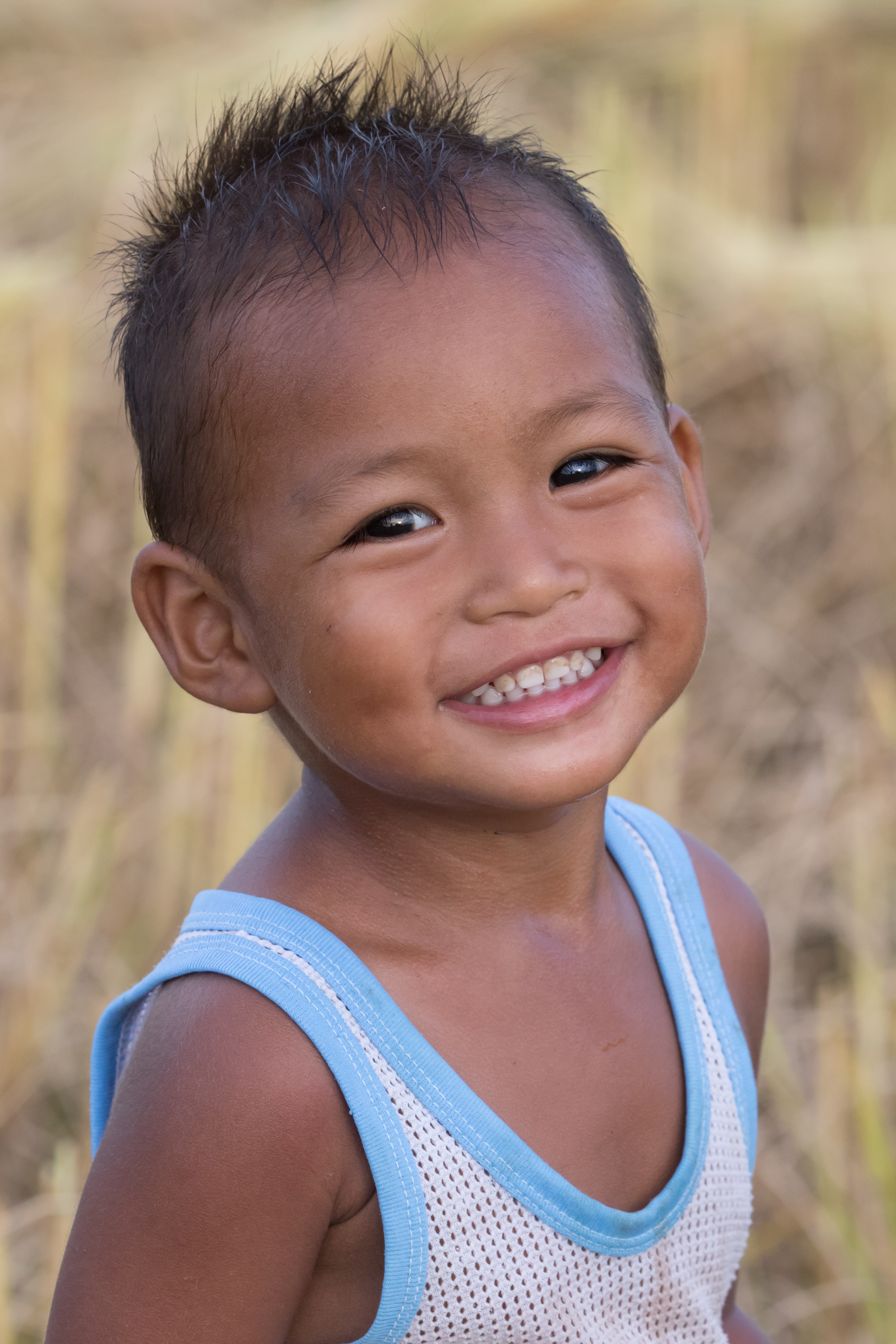
A young boy in Laos

A boy is a young male human. The term is commonly used for a child or an adolescent. When a male human reaches adulthood, they are usually described as a man.

== Definition, etymology, and use ==
According to the Merriam-Webster Dictionary, a boy is "a male child from birth to adulthood".

The word "boy" comes from Middle English boi, boye ("boy, servant"), related to other Germanic words for boy, namely East Frisian boi ("boy, young man") and West Frisian boai ("boy"). Although the exact etymology is obscure, the English and Frisian forms probably derive from an earlier Anglo-Frisian *bō-ja ("little brother"), a diminutive of the Germanic root *bō- ("brother, male relation"), from Proto-Indo-European *bhā-, *bhāt- ("father, brother"). The root is also found in Norwegian dialectal boa ("brother"), and, through a reduplicated variant *bō-bō-, in Old Norse bófi, Dutch boef "(criminal) knave, rogue", German Bube ("knave, rogue, boy"). Furthermore, the word may be related to Bōia, an Anglo-Saxon personal name.

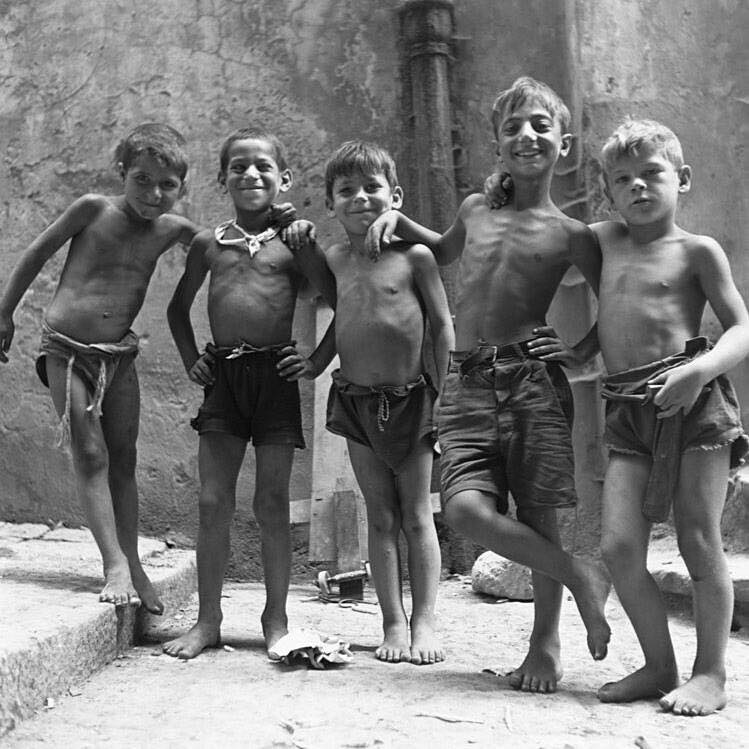
Neapolitan children

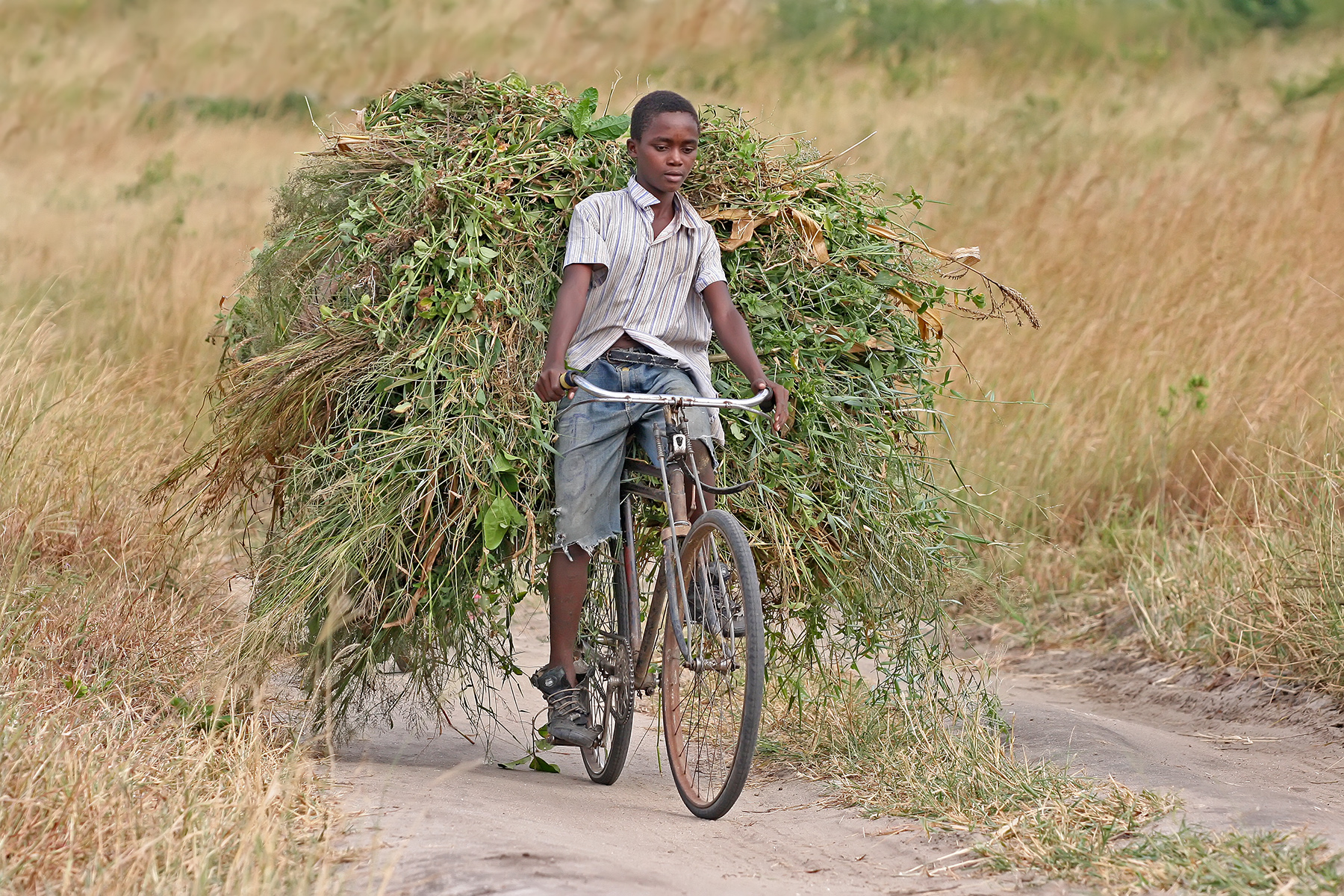
Tanzanian boy transporting fodder

=== Specific uses ===
==== Race ====
Since 1821, in the United States and South Africa, "boy" was used not only for domestic servants, but also more generally as a disparaging term for men of color (especially black men); the term implied a subservient status. Thomas H. Branch, an early African-American Seventh-day Adventist missionary to Nyasaland (now Malawi) referred to the native students as "boys":

There is one way by which we judge many of our present boys to be quite different from some of those who were here long ago: those that are married have their wives here with them, and build their own houses, and all are busy making their gardens. I have told all the boys that if they wished to stay here and learn, those that had wives must bring them.

Multiple politicians – including New Jersey Governor Chris Christie and former Kentucky Congressman Geoff Davis – have been criticized publicly for referring to black men as "boy".

During an event promoting the 2017 boxing bout between Floyd Mayweather Jr. and Conor McGregor, the latter told the former to "dance for me, boy." The remarks led several boxers – including Mayweather and Andre Ward – as well as multiple commentators to accuse McGregor of racism.

== Biology ==
=== Sex determination ===
A child's genetic sex is determined by the sex chromosome of the sperm involved. Typically, if an egg is fertilized by a sperm containing an X chromosome, the fetus will have two X chromosomes and its chromosomal sex will be female. If an egg is fertilized by a sperm containing a Y chromosome, the fetus will have XY chromosomes and its chromosomal sex will be male.

Human sex is determined at fertilization when the genetic sex of the zygote is determined by whether the sperm cell contains an X or Y chromosome. If the sperm cell contains an X chromosome, the fetus will be XX and, typically, a girl will develop. A sperm cell carrying a Y chromosome results in an XY combination, and typically a boy will develop. Variations from this general rule result in intersex fetuses.

=== In utero development and genitalia ===
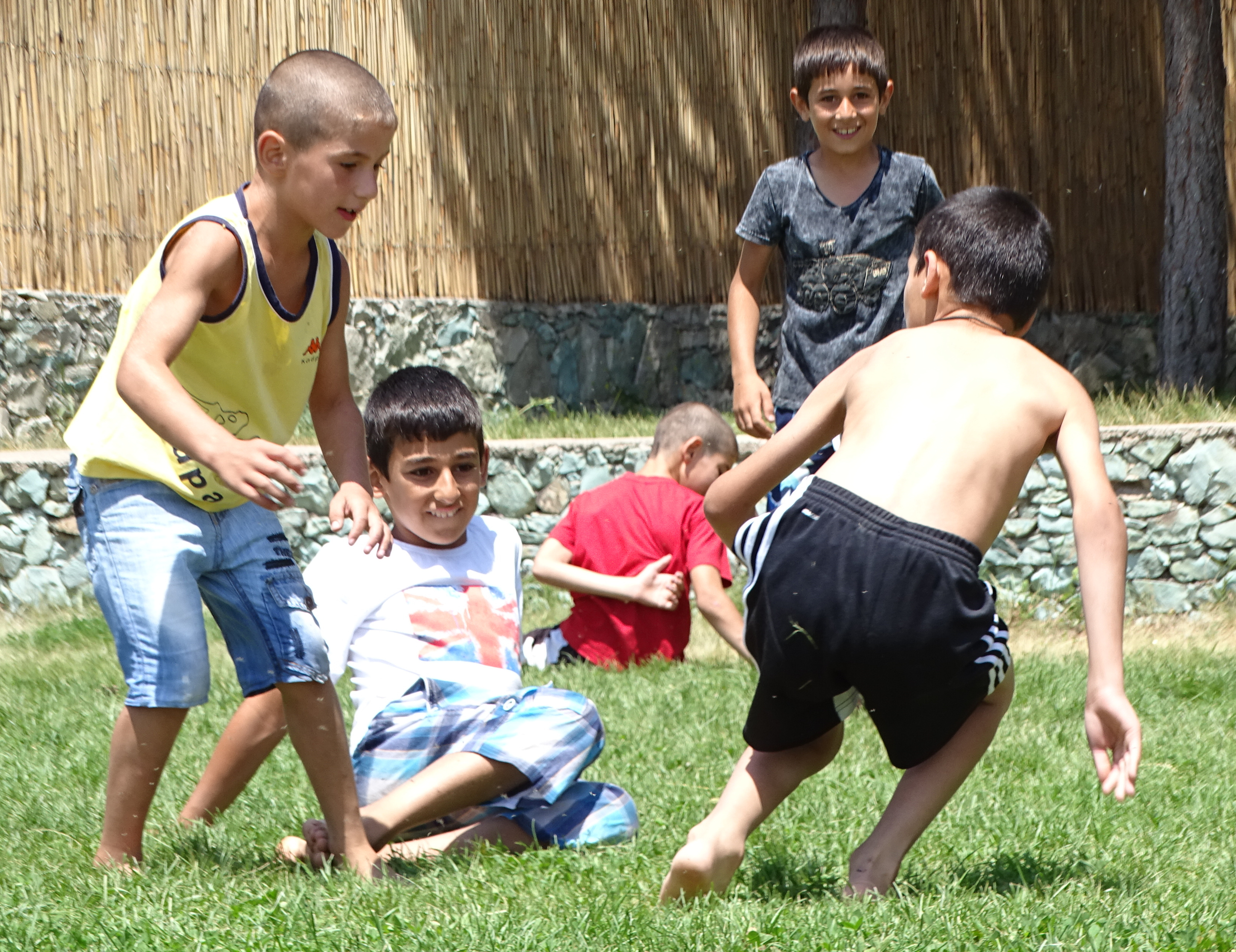
Armenian boys at play

In male embryos at six to seven weeks' gestation, "the expression of a gene on the Y chromosome induces changes that result in the development of the testes". At approximately nine weeks' gestation, the production of testosterone by a male embryo results in the development of the male reproductive system.

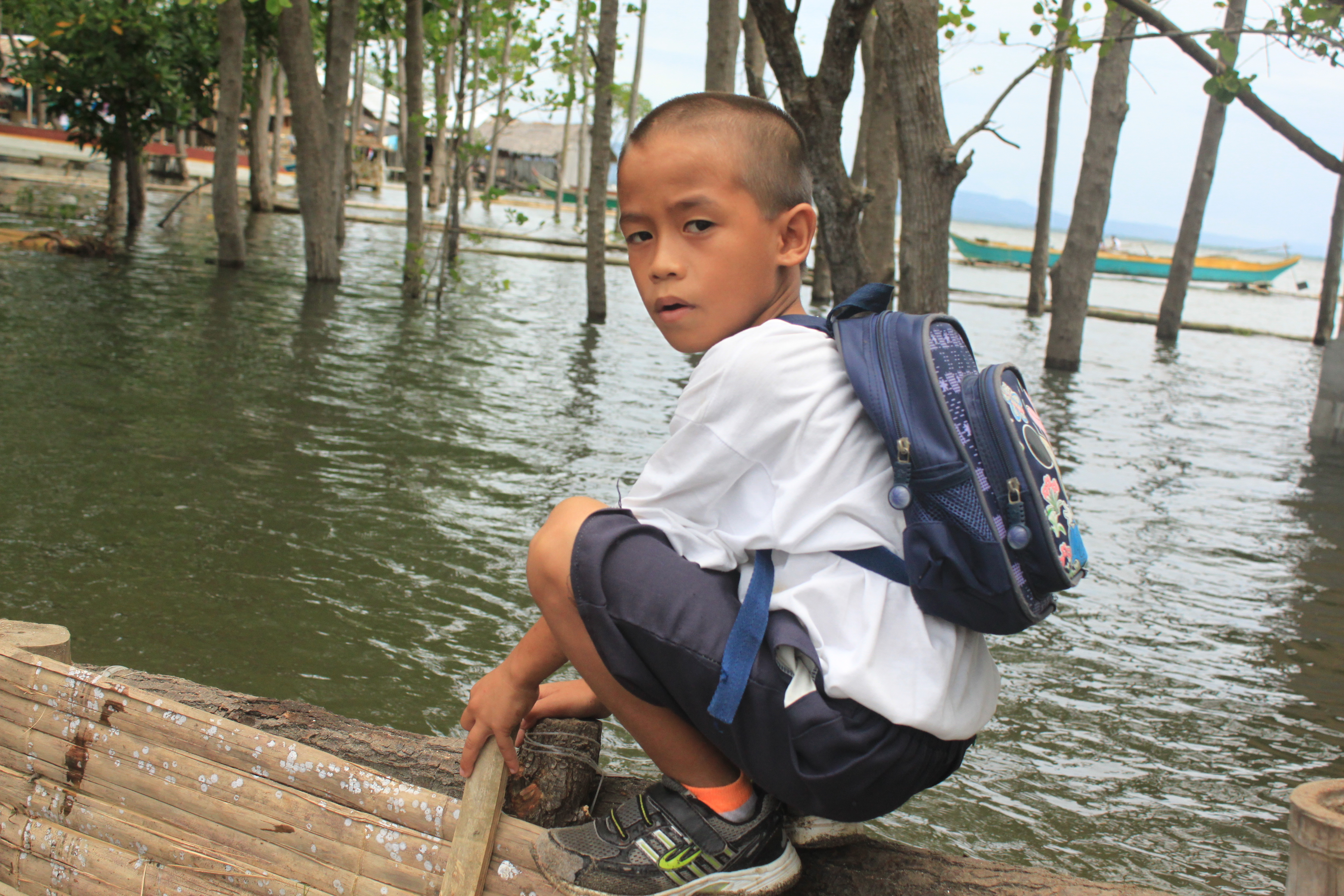
Filipino boy

The male reproductive system includes both external and internal organs. The external organs include the penis, the scrotum, and the testicles (or testes). The penis is a cylindrical organ filled with spongy tissue. It is the organ used by boys to expel urine. The foreskin of some boys' penises is removed in a process known as circumcision. The scrotum is a loose sac of skin behind the penis which contains the testicles. Testicles are oval-shaped gonads. A boy generally possesses two testicles. Internal male reproductive organs include the vas deferens, the ejaculatory ducts, the urethra, the seminal vesicles, and the prostate gland.

=== Physical maturation ===
Puberty is the process by which children's bodies mature into adult bodies that are capable of reproduction. On average, boys begin puberty at ages 11–12 and complete puberty at ages 16–17.

In boys, puberty begins with the enlargement of the testicles and scrotum. The penis also increases in size, and a boy develops pubic hair. A boy's testicles also begin making sperm. The release of semen, which contains sperm and other fluids, is called ejaculation. During puberty, a boy's erect penis becomes capable of ejaculating semen and impregnating a female. A boy's first ejaculation is an important milestone in their development. On average, a boy's first ejaculation occurs at age 13. Ejaculation sometimes occurs during sleep; this phenomenon is known as a nocturnal emission.

When a boy reaches puberty, testosterone triggers the development of secondary sex characteristics. A boy's muscles increase in size and mass, their voice deepens, their bones lengthen, and the shape of their face and body changes. The increased secretion of testosterone from the testicles during puberty causes the male secondary sexual characteristics to be manifested. Male secondary sex characteristics include:

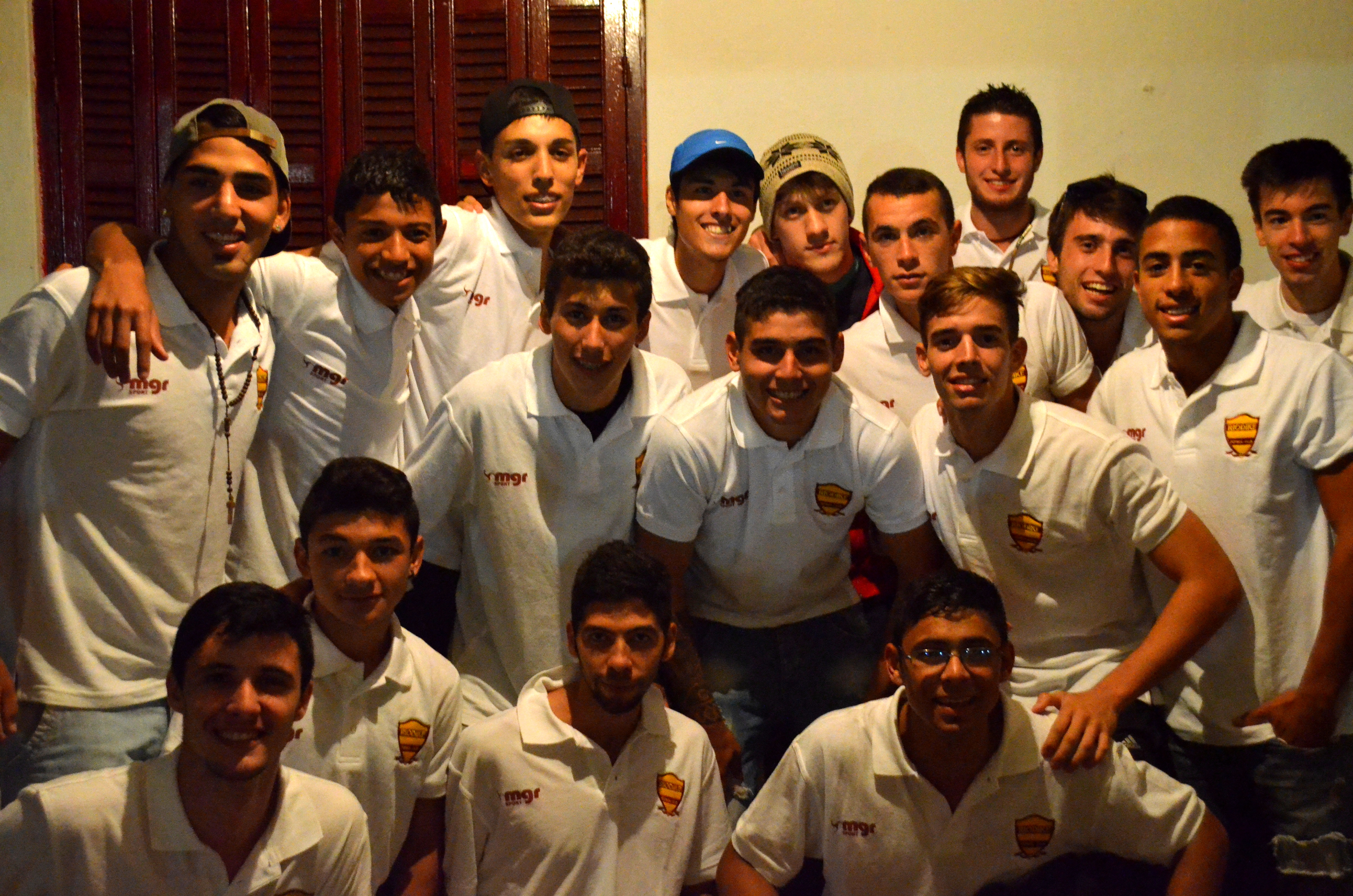
Adolescent boys in Uruguay

- Growth of body hair, including underarm, abdominal, chest, and pubic hair.
- Growth of facial hair.
- Enlargement of larynx (Adam's apple) and deepening of voice.
- Increased stature; adult males are taller than adult females, on average.
- Heavier skull and bone structure.
- Increased muscle mass and strength.
- Broadening of shoulders and chest; shoulders wider than hips.
- Increased secretions of oil and sweat glands.

== Group and gender norms ==
Boys across various age groups are often part of social circles that establish their own unique norms. These norms serve as a benchmark for boys to assess their peers. The adherence to these group norms often holds more weight than the mere affiliation to the group. In fact, boys who do not conform to these norms are often evaluated lower than those who, despite being strangers, conform to the group's norms. This phenomenon underscores the powerful influence of group norms in shaping attitudes and actions, and the social implications of conformity. Boys who defy gender norms may face a higher risk of abuse, and may experience more depression than gender-conforming peers, as well as social stigma from parents and peers. The gender policing towards them can increase the risk of alcohol use, anxiety, and depression in adulthood.

In some cultures, the birth of a male child (boy) is considered prosperous.

== Boys and child labor ==
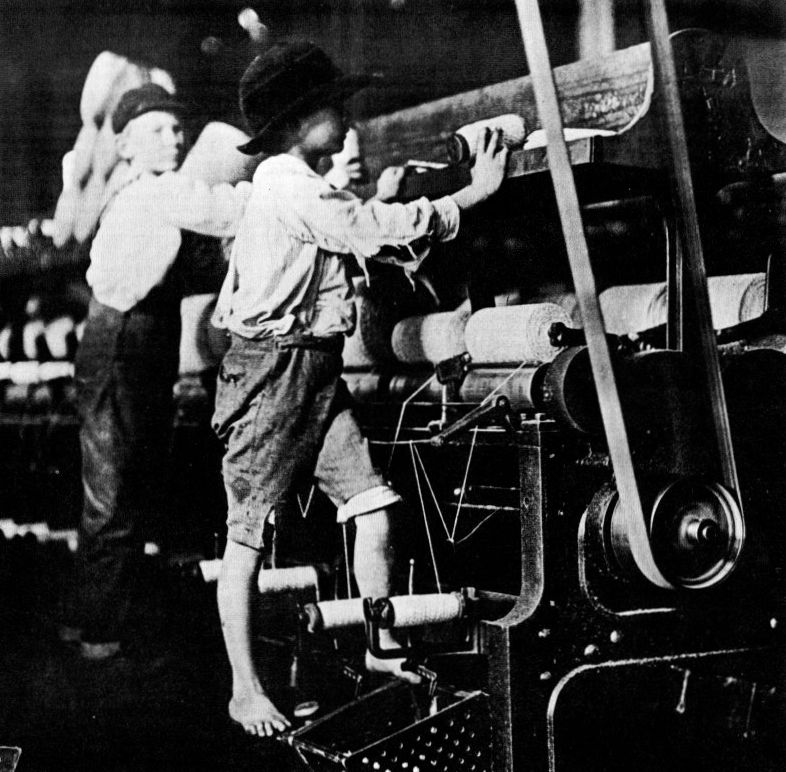
Boys working in textile mills Massachusetts, 1912

Boys perform the majority of child labor around the world compared to girls; 88 million child laborers are boys and 64 million are girls. Boys are also the primary victims of hazardous child labor. They are mainly employed in the agriculture, construction and mining sectors. Boy workers also account for about 87 percent of those who died on the job between 2003 and 2016 in the US.

Many boys are given basic reading, writing, and mathematics skills and then forced to pursue their father's profession to alleviate the financial burden of the family. This is one of the main reasons why boys are preferred over girls by rural communities in poor countries. In India, by contrast, the majority of adopted children are girls even though boys are preferred in general compared to girls.

== See also ==
- History of childhood
- History of childhood in the United States
- Tomboy

== Sources ==
- Fauci, Anthony S.; Braunwald, Eugene; Kasper, Dennis L.; Hauser, Stephen L.; Longo, Dan L.; Jameson, J. Larry; Loscalzo, Joseph (2008). Harrison's Principles of Internal Medicine (17th ed.). McGraw-Hill Medical. pp. 2339–2346. ISBN 9780071466332.
- Van de Graaff, Kent M.; Fox, Stuart Ira (1989). Concepts of Human Anatomy and Physiology. Dubuque, Iowa: William C. Brown Publishers. ISBN 0697056759.
