= Bourn Pond =

- Location of Bourn Pond within New York
- Location: Delaware County, New York
- Coordinates: 42°18′05″N 75°03′39″W
- Type: Lake
- Primary inflows: East Branch Handsome Brook
- Primary outflows: East Branch Handsome Brook
- Surface area: 16 acres (0.025 mi^{2}; 6.5 ha)
- Surface elevation: 1,949 feet (594 m)
- Settlements: Treadwell

Bourn Pond is a small lake located south-southwest of the hamlet of Treadwell in Delaware County, New York. The East Branch Handsome Brook flows through Bourn Pond.

== See also ==
- List of lakes in New York
