= Pohuenui River =

River in New Zealand

Location
- Country: New Zealand

Physical characteristics
- Mouth
  - location: Waipu River
  - coordinates: 35°58′38″S 174°27′08″E
- Length: 17 km (11 mi)

The Pohuenui River is a river of the Northland Region of New Zealand's North Island. It flows southeast, reaching the Waipu River close to the latter's mouth, immediately north of the town of Waipu.

The New Zealand Ministry for Culture and Heritage gives a translation of "large climbing plant" for Pōhuenui.

== See also ==
- List of rivers of New Zealand
