= Handsome Brook =

- Location of the mouth of Handsome Brook

Location
- Country: United States
- State: New York
- County: Delaware

Physical characteristics
- Source: East Branch Handsome Brook
  - coordinates: 42°18′15″N 75°03′05″W
- 2nd source: West Branch Handsome Brook
  - coordinates: 42°16′48″N 75°04′39″W
- Mouth: Ouleout Creek
  - coordinates: 42°19′36″N 75°11′29″W
  - elevation: 1,152 ft (351 m)

Handsome Brook is a river in Delaware County, New York. It flows into the Ouleout Creek southwest of Franklin.
