= Goodar Township, Michigan =

- Civil township
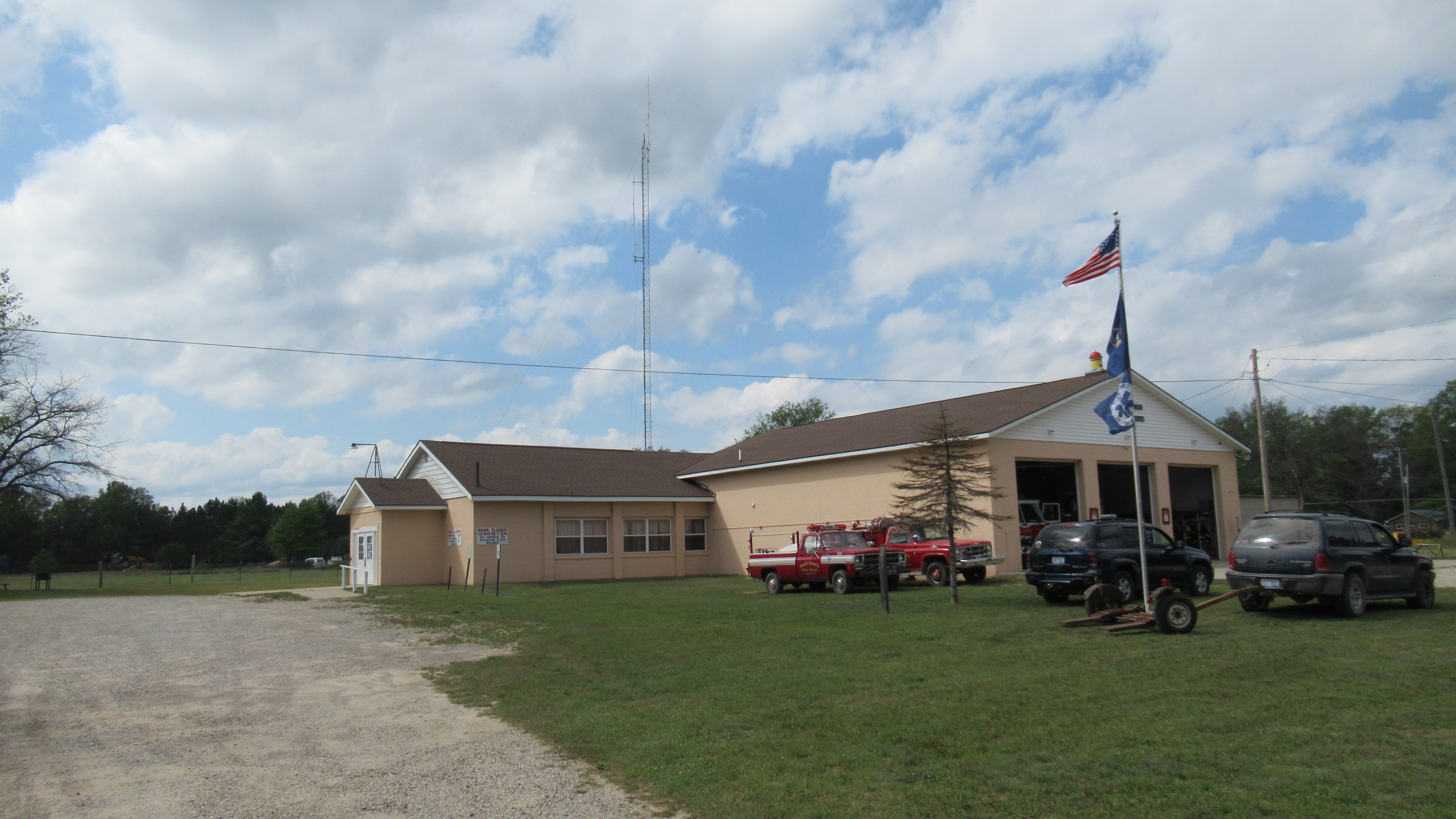
- Goodar Township Hall and Fire Department

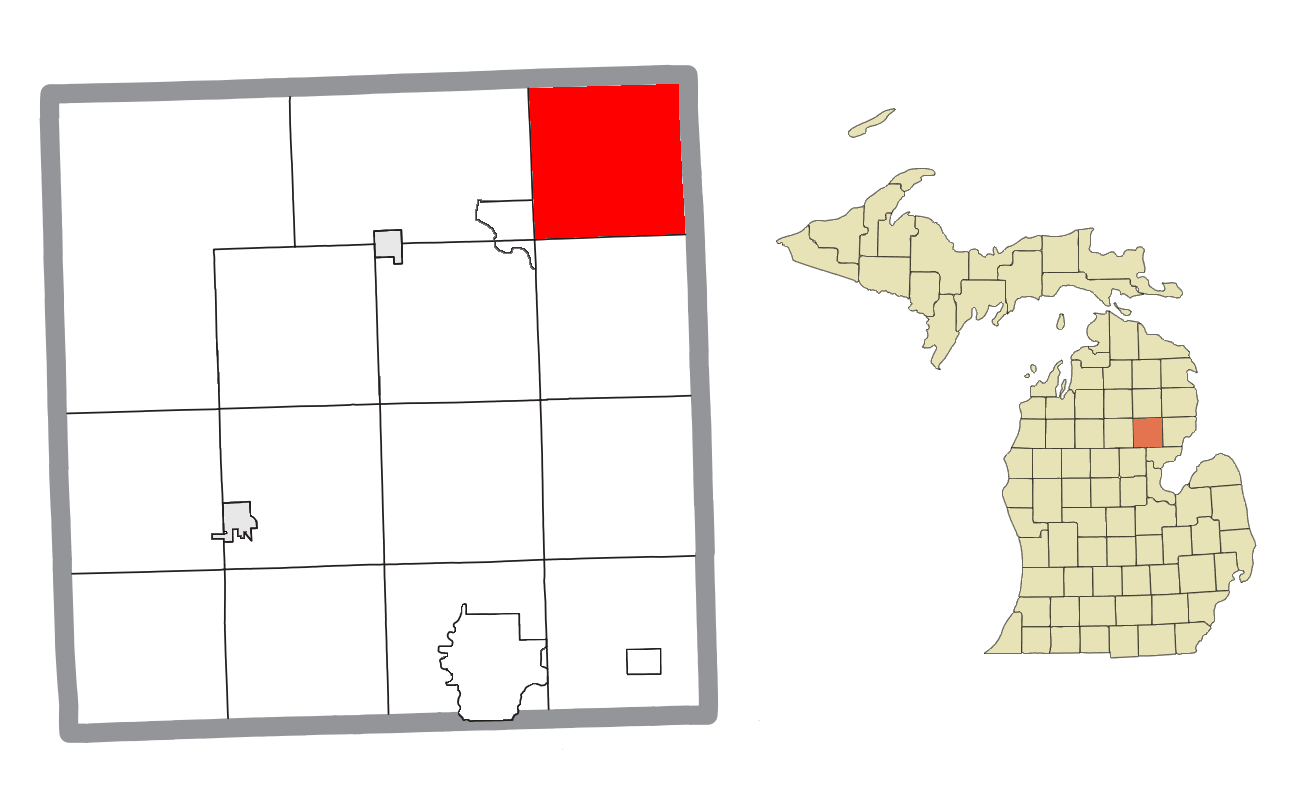
- Location within Ogemaw County

- Location within the state of Michigan Location within the United States
- Coordinates: 44°27′20″N 83°55′06″W
- Country: United States
- State: Michigan
- County: Ogemaw
- Organized: 1888

Government
  - Supervisor: Thomas Czerniak
  - Clerk: Larry McNenly

Area
  - Total: 36.14 sq mi (93.60 km^{2})
  - Land: 35.45 sq mi (91.82 km^{2})
  - Water: 0.69 sq mi (1.79 km^{2})
- Elevation: 942 ft (287 m)

Population (2020)
  - Total: 350
  - Density: 9.87/sq mi (3.81/km^{2})
- Time zone: UTC-5 (Eastern (EST))
  - Summer (DST): UTC-4 (EDT)
- ZIP code(s): 48635 (Lupton); 48739 (Hale); 48761 (South Branch)
- Area code: 989
- FIPS code: 26-32860
- GNIS feature ID: 1626362
- Website: Official website

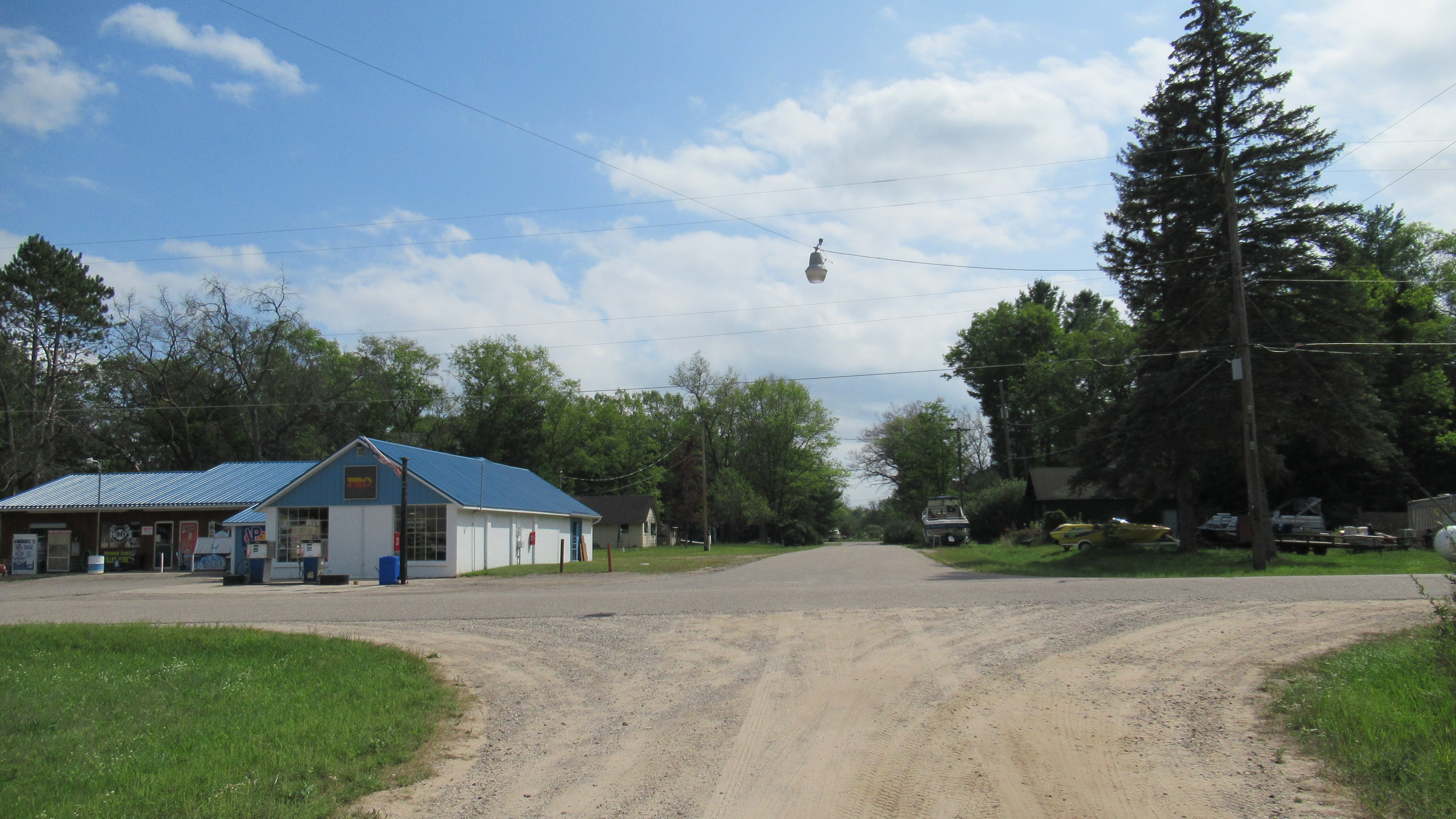
Unincorporated community of South Branch

Goodar Township is a civil township of Ogemaw County in the U.S. state of Michigan. The population was 350 at the 2020 census, which makes it the least-populated municipality in the county.

== Communities ==
- Goodar is an unincorporated community located in the northern portion of the township at 44°30′04″N 83°53′47″W. Goodar had its own post office from 1909–1914.
- South Branch is an unincorporated community in the eastern portion of the township along the county line with Iosco County at 44°28′00″N 83°53′20″W.

== Geography ==
According to the U.S. Census Bureau, the township has a total area of 36.14 square miles (93.60 km^{2}), of which 35.45 square miles (91.82 km^{2}) is land and 0.69 square miles (1.79 km^{2}) (1.96%) is water.

== Demographics ==
As of the census of 2000, there were 493 people, 228 households, and 157 families residing in the township. The population density was 14.0 inhabitants per square mile (5.4/km^{2}). There were 543 housing units at an average density of 15.4 per square mile (5.9/km^{2}). The racial makeup of the township was 97.97% White, 0.41% Native American, 0.20% Asian, 0.41% Pacific Islander, 0.61% from other races, and 0.41% from two or more races. Hispanic or Latino of any race were 1.42% of the population.

There were 228 households, out of which 16.7% had children under the age of 18 living with them, 61.4% were married couples living together, 5.7% had a female householder with no husband present, and 31.1% were non-families. 26.8% of all households were made up of individuals, and 15.8% had someone living alone who was 65 years of age or older. The average household size was 2.16 and the average family size was 2.59.

In the township the population was spread out, with 17.8% under the age of 18, 3.0% from 18 to 24, 17.8% from 25 to 44, 33.9% from 45 to 64, and 27.4% who were 65 years of age or older. The median age was 53 years. For every 100 females, there were 89.6 males. For every 100 females age 18 and over, there were 96.6 males.

The median income for a household in the township was $28,214, and the median income for a family was $30,139. Males had a median income of $26,250 versus $15,714 for females. The per capita income for the township was $14,052. About 11.0% of families and 14.6% of the population were below the poverty line, including 14.3% of those under age 18 and 6.7% of those age 65 or over.
