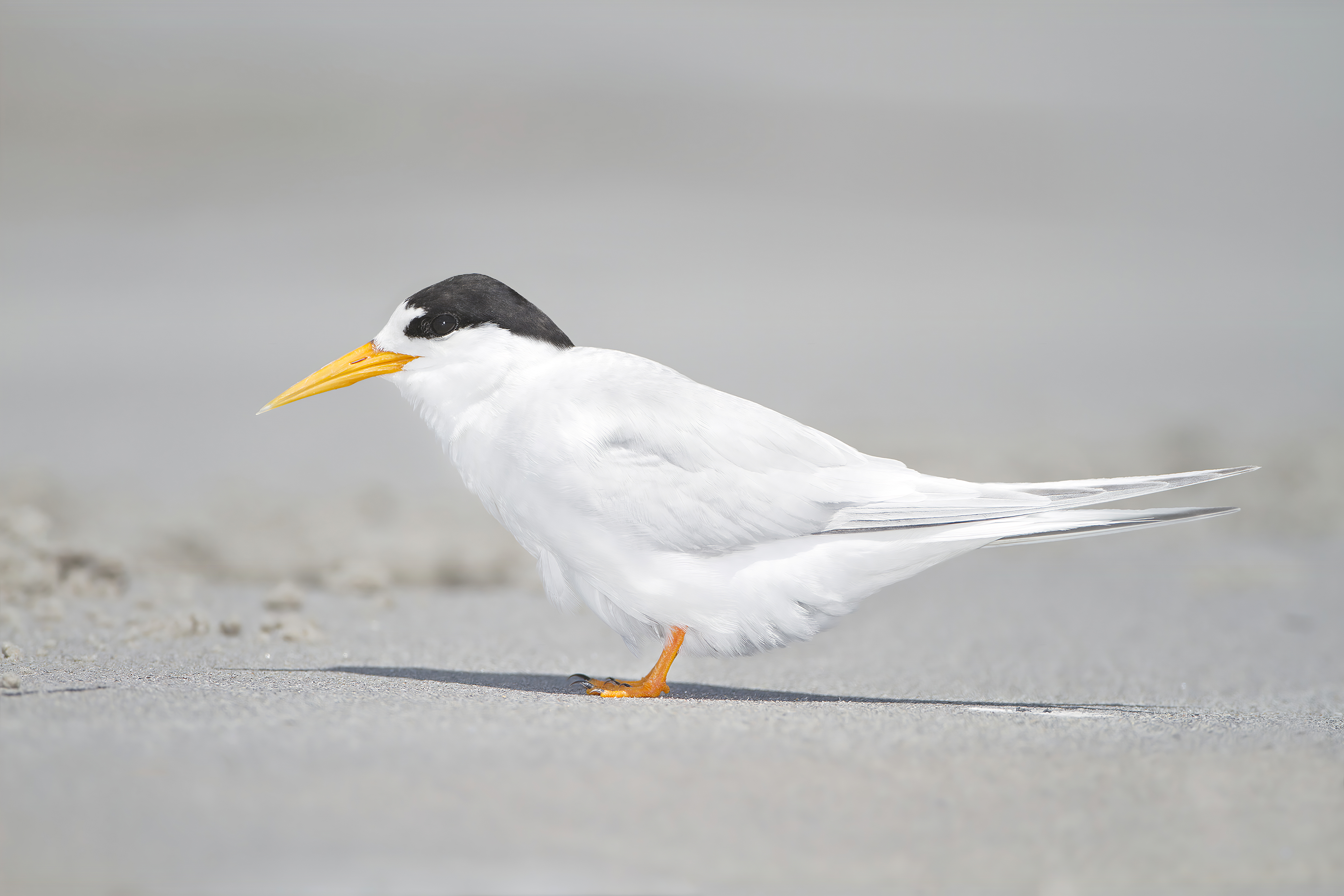

Conservation status
- Vulnerable (IUCN 3.1)

Scientific classification
- Kingdom: Animalia
- Phylum: Chordata
- Class: Aves
- Order: Charadriiformes
- Family: Laridae
- Genus: Sternula
- Species: S. nereis

Binomial name
- Sternula nereis Gould, 1843

Subspecies
- Sternula nereis davisae Sternula nereis exsul Sternula nereis nereis

Synonyms
- Sterna nereis

= Fairy tern =

Species of bird

The fairy tern (Sternula nereis) is a small tern which is native to the southwestern Pacific. It is listed as vulnerable by the IUCN and the New Zealand subspecies is critically endangered. Fairy terns live in colonies along the coastlines and estuaries of Australia, New Zealand, and New Caledonia, feeding largely on small, epipelagic schooling fishes, breeding in areas close to their feeding sites. They have a monogamous mating system, forming breeding pairs in which they mate, nest, and care for offspring.

There are three subspecies:

- Australian fairy tern, Sternula nereis nereis (Gould, 1843) – breeds in Australia
- New Caledonian fairy tern, Sternula nereis exsul (Mathews, 1912) – breeds in New Caledonia
- New Zealand fairy tern / Tara iti, Sternula nereis davisae (Mathews & Iredale, 1913) – breeds in northern New Zealand

The three subspecies are distinguished by geographical range, and slight morphological differences. Gene flow between subspecies is little to none.

== Description ==
The fairy tern is a small tern with a white body and light bluish-grey wings. A small black patch extends no further than the eye and not as far as the bill. In the breeding plumage both the beak and the legs are yellowish-orange. During the rest of the year the black crown is lost, being mostly replaced by white feathers, and the beak becomes black at the tip and the base. The sexes look alike and the plumage of immature birds is similar to the non-breeding plumage. The total length of the fairy tern is about 25 cm (10 in).

== Status ==
Formerly classified as a species of least concern by the IUCN, recent research shows that its numbers have been decreasing rapidly throughout its range; the New Zealand subspecies has been on the brink of extinction for decades. The fairy tern was consequently uplisted to vulnerable status in 2008. The New Zealand fairy tern has numerous breeding areas, largely incorporating the upper-north region of the North Island. In 2011, there were only about 42 known individuals. With a breeding program in place by the New Zealand Department of Conservation, the population was estimated in 2020 at 40. Since then, their breeding sites have been reduced to only four consistent locations, limited to the South of the Northland Peninsula. In 2023, less than 40 individuals and 9 breeding pairs of the New Zealand fairy tern remained, the subspecies becoming a high priority for conservation.

== Behaviour ==
=== Feeding ===
Fairy terns are surface plungers, feeding on fish that shoal just under the water surface. To forage, fairy terns hover between 5 and 15 metres above the water to search for prey, then carrying out a descending aerial dive beak-first towards the water. They then spread their wings and tails just above the water surface, submerging only their bills and heads to catch their prey. This foraging technique means that they catch prey no deeper than around eight centimetres under the water surface, allowing them to make use of shallow waters, such as tidal pools. Fairy terns seldom go far out to sea but are often to be seen where predatory fish are feeding on shoals of small fish.

Fairy tern diets consist predominantly of pelagic schooling fishes. For instance, Australian fairy terns mostly eat blue sprat, hardyheads, and garfishes. Similarly, New Zealand fairy terns have a diet made up of common estuarine fish, namely gobies and flounders, responsible for most of their consumed biomass, as well as shrimps, comprising up to 21% of their diet. Little research has been done on the diet of New Caledonian fairy terns, but given their foraging technique, it is likely that they too forage for small marine fish that school just below the water surface. Fairy terns also consume crustaceans, molluscs and some plant material. Diets may vary according to location, time of day, developmental stage and breeding season.

=== Breeding ===
Breeding takes place in the spring in colonies on sheltered beaches on the mainland or on offshore islands. The nest is just above high-water mark and is a scrape in the sand. Fairy terns have a monogamous mating system, forming pair bonds in which they provision food, mate, nest, and care for offspring. One or two eggs are laid and both parents share the incubation and care of the chicks and have occasionally been seen providing post-fledging parental care. Breeding success is low.

==== Breeding Season ====
Fairy terns breed during spring, with courtship beginning in September, and nesting occurring largely from November to February. Their breeding season largely overlaps with the spawning season for much of their prey, allowing fairy terns to make use of a higher abundance of food that is required for courtship provisioning, energy for breeding, and feeding offspring. Females breed at around three years old, while males breed from age two. Each year, fairy terns develop breeding plumage, where their bills, legs, and feet become brighter and darker, and the dark colouration on their heads extends from forehead to nape. This plumage signals sexual maturity, and elicits the courtship process.

==== Courtship ====
After developing breeding plumage, fairy terns begin the courtship process. During pair-formation, fairy terns exhibit ritualised courtship behaviours. Courtship displays are typically exhibited by male fairy terns to attract females during mate selection. Fairy tern courtship behaviours include aerial displays as well as ground displays. Aerial displays may be social, involving cooperative exhibitions of dynamic flight patterns. Ground displays involve catching and exhibiting fish, to signal foraging ability. As observed in many avian species, courtship displays function to indicate mate quality in order to facilitate reproductive success. In fairy terns, courtship displays are essential to breeding, which will not occur without them. Another key element of courtship in Fairy Terns is the exchange of fish, which is initially essential before copulation can occur in breeding pairs. Males will provision food to the female, which persists throughout the breeding season. Male provisioning behaviour is thought to function to demonstrate the parental ability of the male in courtship.

==== Pair Bonds ====
Following courtship, fairy terns form pair bonds. In these pairs, fairy terns prospect potential nesting sites within the colony territory. Once chosen, pairs will frequently visit their nesting habitat, feed together, and mate frequently. High levels of fidelity are generally observed. Although fairy terns are typically observed forming single pair bonds during the mating season, multiple mating pairs and copulation have been observed in Australian fairy terns. Here, males will typically guard their partner during breeding, in attempt to prevent polyandrous copulation outside of their breeding pair. Fairy terns stay in their breeding pairs throughout nesting, both investing in the biparental care of chicks and eggs together.

==== Nesting ====
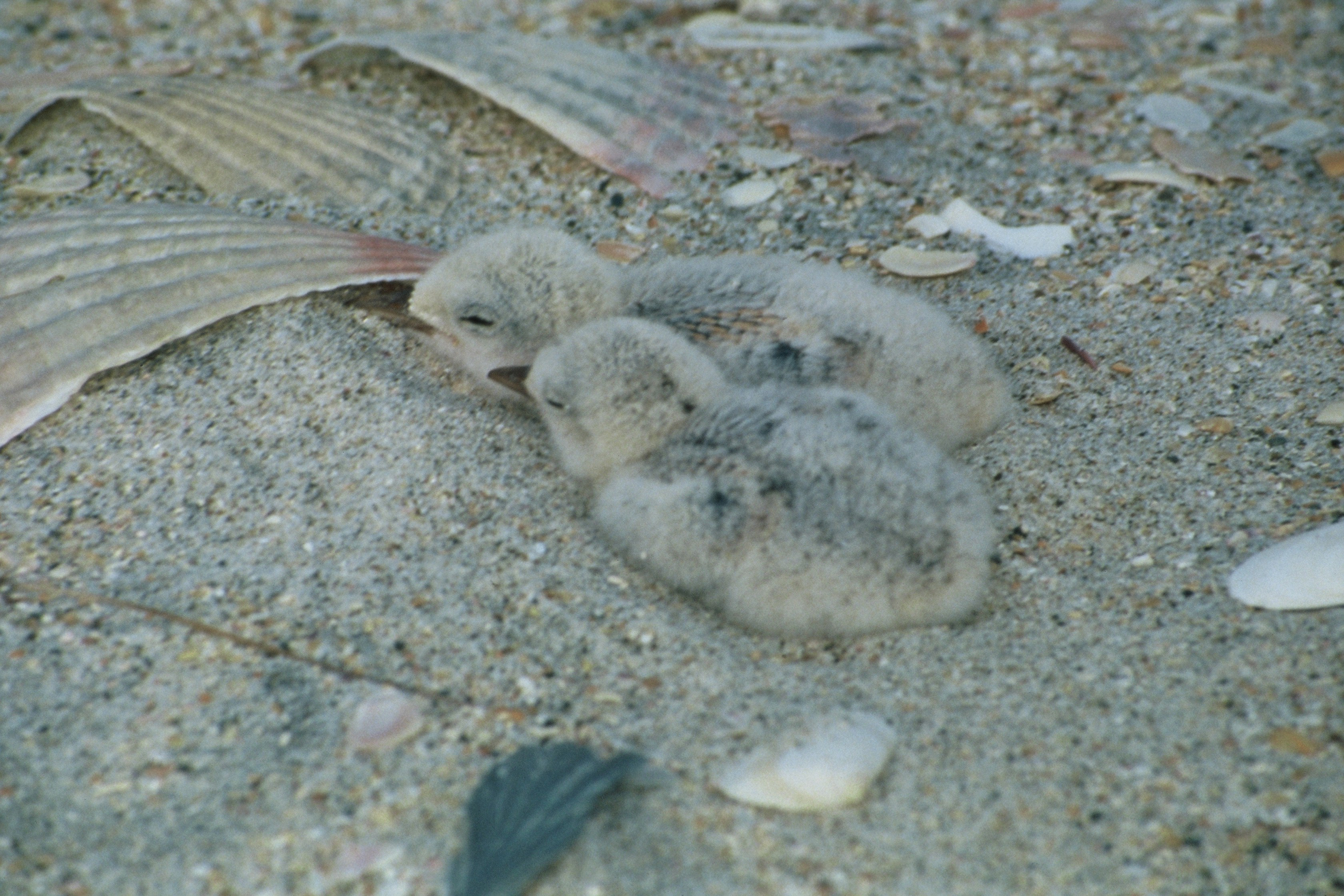
Tara iti (New Zealand fairy tern) chicks in nest.

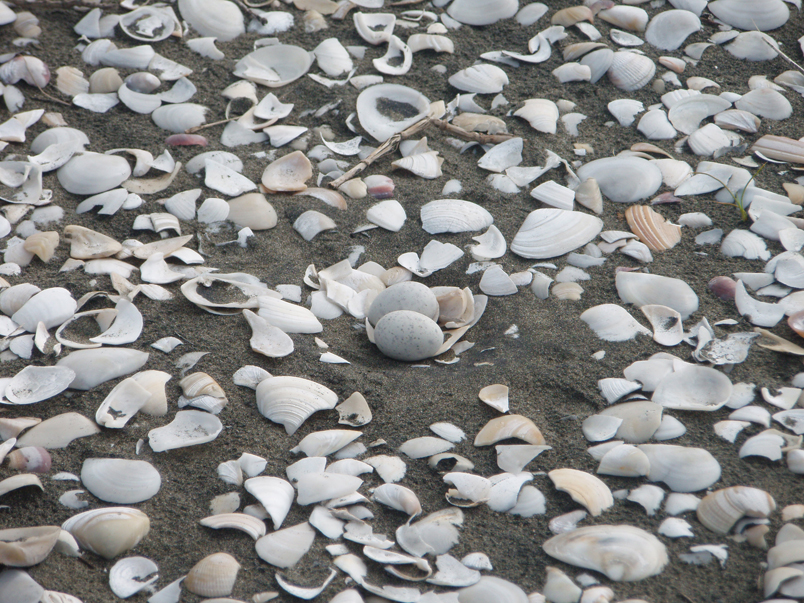
Fairy tern eggs camouflage with shells.

Fairy terns nest in low lying sand, eggs and young camouflaging with surrounding shells, shingle or gravel. They construct their nests by scraping the sand with their legs, rotating in a circle until they have dug sand from all directions. Fairy terns may create several nests before their final selection of nest choice. Fairy terns have been observed to nest in different location types, including seaside bays, estuary mouths, sheltered lagoons and saltwater lakes. Given their gregarious nature, nest selection is influenced by social facilitation, where the observation of nesting success in conspecifics of their colony will direct fairy terns to also nest in that location. Colonies will often abandon nest location once the breeding season ends, driven by changing availability of food, predators, and vegetation.

Nest location may be related to feeding site, where fairy terns will select areas that allow them to easily and quickly access food for their young while nesting. Like many other terns, fairy terns often nest in sandy beach areas with little vegetation, allowing them to detect predators easily, and nest close to feeding sites. However, too little vegetation leaves fairy terns with insufficient shelter, making them more vulnerable to weather and avian predation. So, choice of nest site is influenced by evolutionary trade-offs pressured by a need for safety and food. Another key aspect of nest site selection is an abundance of shell cover, which fairy terns will preferentially choose. This preference seemingly functions to increase camouflage and avoid predator detection, given their colouration which likely evolved to matched the white, orange and black shelled areas in which they nest.

During nesting, female fairy terns rarely leave the nesting site. Males supply their partner with food throughout the nesting and incubation periods, though this behaviour decreases over time until the eggs hatch, when provisioning increases once more to care for the offspring. Male provisional feeding gives the female nutritional support, allowing her to invest more in nesting and attend the eggs. Males may experience a decrease in body mass during this period, given the energy expense of provisioning behaviour. This food provisioning behaviour, typically carried out by males, is therefore important in increasing breeding success.

==== Breeding Success ====
Fairy tern clutch size varies from one to three eggs, with clutch size of one or two being most common. Larger broods typically occur with more experienced pairs, and only when resources are abundant. The second egg is typically laid one to four days after the first. The incubation period lasts approximately 22 days.

Studies on New Caledonian fairy terns find breeding success to be quite low. Chick mortality may occur due to several factors including predation by other avian species, tidal flooding, egg failure, adverse weather and parental desertion. Breeding success is also hindered by nest disturbance from conspecifics nesting nearby. The "grieving parent" syndrome has been observed in New Zealand fairy terns, where parents who experience offspring failure will kill the chicks of a nearby nest. Surveys of New Caledonian fairy terns find breeding success to be highly impacted by adverse weather, where almost all nests across 2 years were destroyed by weathering. In 2020, breeding success in New Caledonian fairy terns was less than 15%. The low breeding success of New Caledonian fairy terns is similar to that of the endangered New Zealand fairy tern. Further research is required to reliably establish breeding success in the Australian and New Zealand subspecies, though it is thought to be very low given their high vulnerability to tidal flooding and predation. However, adult survival is considerably higher, where fairy terns are able to mate for multiple breeding seasons, giving hope to the continuation of their species.

==== Parental Behaviour ====
As observed in other tern species, both male and female fairy terns contribute equally towards parental care. In their pair bonds, both males and females feed their offspring. Males continue to provide food to the female as well as young. When there is only one chick, males feed the chick more than the female, and at night, the females care for the chicks. Chick feeding rates vary considerably between nests, and decrease with disturbance as parents engage more in defensive behaviour. Parents are highly attentive towards chicks particularly in the first few days after hatching. Chicks are not left unattended until at least 14 days of age; fledgling occurs at approximately day 23.

Parental behaviour is influenced by a variety of components. Increased wind speed is associated with increased time spent with young, presumably to increase protection to favour offspring survival. Feeding of young occurs the most frequently approximately three hours past low tide, while foraging occurs at high tide.

Increased aggression, both conspecific and intraspecific, is observed when parents are with young. In defence, to protect their offspring, fairy terns will display aggressive behaviours towards perceived potential predators (mammalian, avian, and human), as well as intruding conspecifics. This aggressive behaviour will be exhibited upon intrusion within 75 metres of the nest site. Parents will also extend their wings over chicks to provide protection to young.

== Threats ==
=== Predation ===
Fairy terns are predated on by small mammals, which may eat adults, chicks and eggs. In Australia, the presence of semi-wild cats threatens the already declining population of Australian fairy terns. Likewise, in New Zealand, non-native invasive mammalian species including rats, mustelids, hedgehogs and cats, predate on fairy terns. As with fairy terns, non-native mammalian predation is a common issue for vulnerable endemic birds in New Zealand, and is a key focus for conversation.

Fairy tern chicks and eggs are also at risk of avian predation. Specifically, birds including harrier hawks and black backed gulls will eat chicks and eggs. The only defence against predation for fairy tern chicks is their cryptic colouration, which allows them to camouflage with seashells that surround their nests. This contributes to a high level of chick mortality that threatens the decreasing population of fairy terns, particularly for the endangered New Zealand and New Caledonian subspecies.

=== Human Disturbance ===
Human disturbance poses a great threat to fairy terns. Particularly during the breeding season, human activity puts fairy terns at risk of further population decrease, disrupting nesting and breeding behaviours to ultimately reduce breeding success. The New Zealand Department of Conservation warns of the danger of human activation including dog walking, drone use, bonfires, vehicular beach use, horse riding, and recreational beach activities in fairy tern breeding areas. These disturbances have been known to not only disrupt breeding behaviours, but to scare fairy terns away from their nests, causing fairy terns to abandon their eggs, leaving them vulnerable to predation as well as embryo death due to thermal exposure. For this reason, conservation efforts are being made to reduce human disturbance towards fairy terns.
