= East Branch Handsome Brook =

- Location of the mouth of East Branch Handsome Brook

Location
- Country: United States
- State: New York
- County: Delaware

Physical characteristics
- Source
  - coordinates: 42°18′15″N 75°03′05″W
- Mouth: Handsome Brook
  - coordinates: 42°19′21″N 75°09′45″W
  - elevation: 1,237 ft (377 m)

East Branch Handsome Brook is a river in Delaware County, New York. It flows into Handsome Brook south of Franklin. East Branch Handsome Brook flows through Bourn Pond.
