= Felch Township, Michigan =

- Civil township
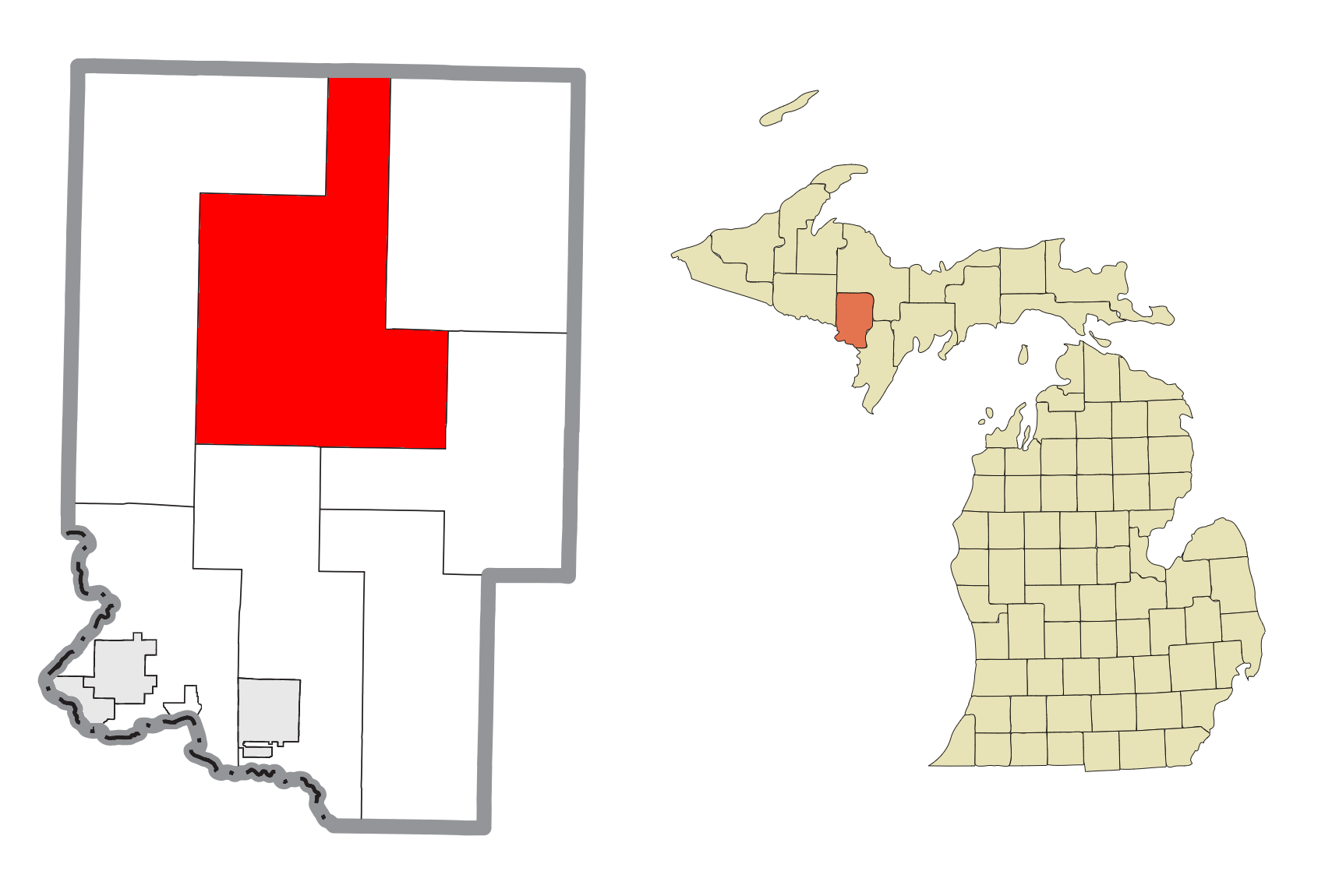
- Location within Dickinson County

- Location within the state of Michigan Location within the United States
- Coordinates: 46°04′47″N 87°52′27″W
- Country: United States
- State: Michigan
- County: Dickinson

Government
  - Supervisor: Robert Mattson
  - Clerk: Darrell Oman

Area
  - Total: 143.81 sq mi (372.47 km^{2})
  - Land: 141.84 sq mi (367.36 km^{2})
  - Water: 1.97 sq mi (5.10 km^{2})
- Elevation: 1,180 ft (360 m)

Population (2020)
  - Total: 687
  - Density: 4.84/sq mi (1.87/km^{2})
- Time zone: UTC-6 (Central (CST))
  - Summer (DST): UTC-5 (CDT)
- ZIP code(s): 49815 (Channing); 49831 (Felch); 49877 (Ralph); 49881 (Sagola)
- Area code: 906
- FIPS code: 26-27660
- GNIS feature ID: 1626273
- Website: Official website

Felch Township is a civil township of Dickinson County in the U.S. state of Michigan, named in honor of Alpheus Felch. The population was 687 at the 2020 census.

== Geography ==
According to the United States Census Bureau, the township has a total area of 143.8 square miles (372 km^{2}), of which, 143.1 square miles (371 km^{2}) of it is land and 0.7 square miles (1.8 km^{2}) of it (0.47%) is water.

== Communities ==
There are no incorporated municipalities in the township.

- Felch is an unincorporated community on M-69 at 45°59′50″N 87°49′33″W. Felch was a station on a branch of the Chicago and North Western Railway. A post office has been in operation there since 1906.
- Metropolitan was a thriving village established just after 1880 to exploit the iron ore in the nearby Metropolitan Mine. Metropolitan was about one mile west of Felch and was the last station on a branch of the Chicago and North Western Railway coming west from Escanaba. The village was platted by the Metropolitan Mining Company in 1881. A post office was in operation there from 1881 until 1963. The present Zion Lutheran Church of Metropolitan sits almost exactly on the site of the old village, which is now a string of farms along the country roads. Metropolitan was sometimes referred to as Milltown and Farmertown.
- Theodore is an unincorporated community on M-69 about half a mile northwest of Felch at 46°00′05″N 87°50′07″W. It was platted for the Lake Superior Ship Canal, Railway & Iron Company in 1881 by J.A. Van Clive.
- Felch Mountain is an unincorporated community on M-69 about half a mile northwest of Felch. It is immediately adjacent to, and east of, Theodore. Both Theodore and Felch Mountain are located on a steep hill north of M-69, while Felch and Metropolitan are located in the lower land south of M-69.
- Spruce was a station on the Chicago and North Western Railway at 45°59′09″N 87°46′38″W near the junction of Lucas Rd with M-69

== Demographics ==
As of the census of 2000, there were 726 people, 274 households, and 204 families residing in the township. By 2020, there were 687 people in the township.
