= Branche =

Branche or la Branche is a surname. Notable people with the surname include:

- Alcée Louis la Branche (1806–1861), American politician
- George Branche (born 1953), Sierra Leonean middle-distance runner
- Derrick Branche (born 1947), British actor
- Stanley Branche (1933–1992), American civil rights activist

== See also ==
- Coudekerque-Branche, a commune of Nord department, France
- Branch (disambiguation)
