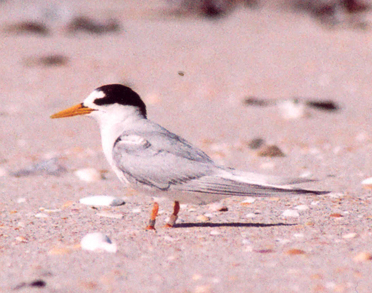

Conservation status
- Nationally Critical (NZ TCS)

Scientific classification
- Kingdom: Animalia
- Phylum: Chordata
- Class: Aves
- Order: Charadriiformes
- Family: Laridae
- Genus: Sternula
- Species: S. nereis
- Subspecies: S. n. davisae

Trinomial name
- Sternula nereis davisae Mathews & Iredale, 1913

= New Zealand fairy tern =

Subspecies of bird

The New Zealand fairy tern or tara-iti (Sternula nereis davisae) is a subspecies of the fairy tern endemic to New Zealand. It is New Zealand's rarest native breeding bird, with about 40 individuals left in the wild. It nests at four coastal locations between Whangārei and Auckland in the North Island. It is threatened by introduced predators, extreme storms and tides, beach activity, and waterfront development.

== Taxonomy and systematics ==
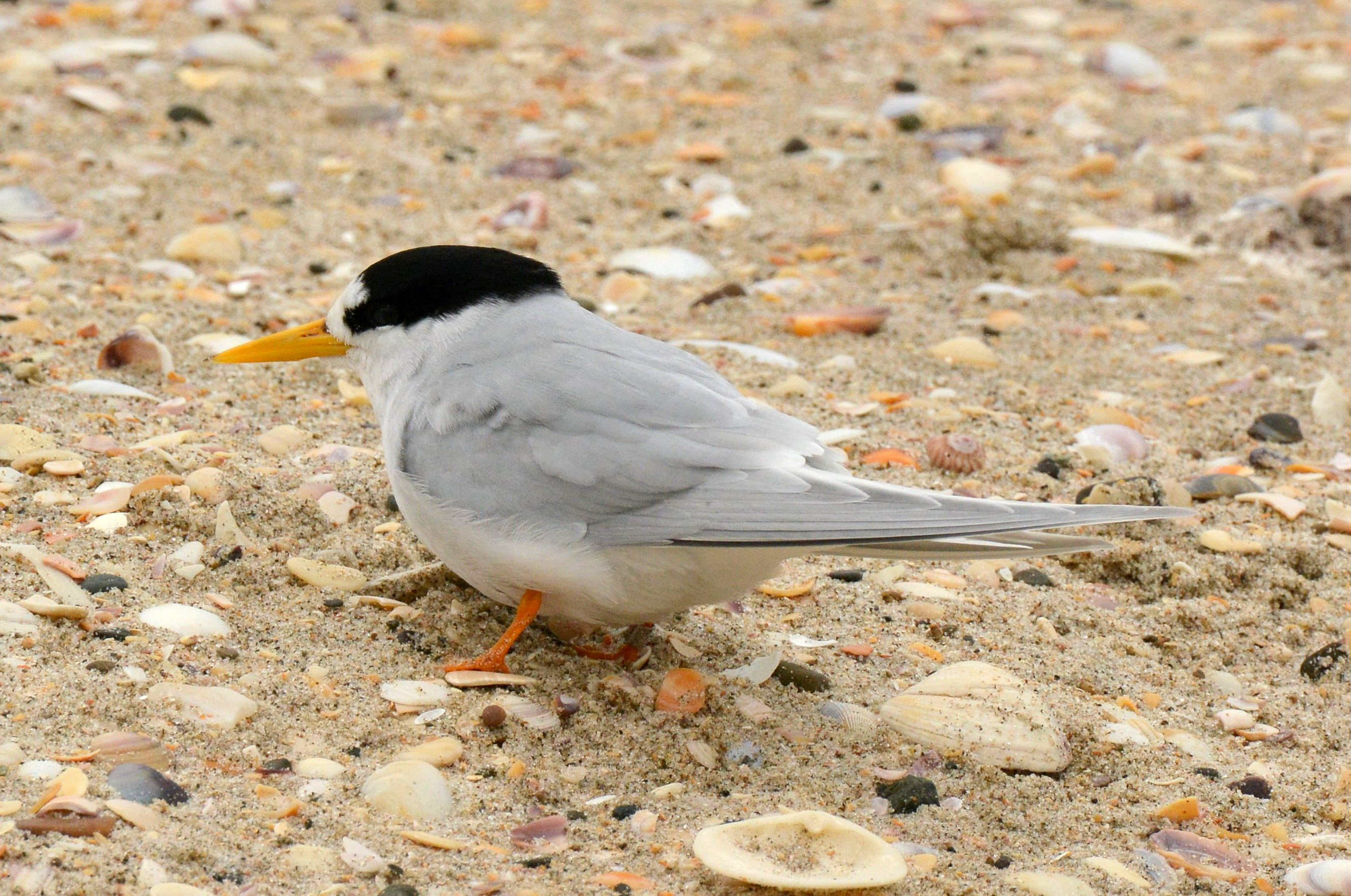
Adult male at Waipu River estuary

The New Zealand fairy tern is currently considered a subspecies of the fairy tern (Sternula nereis). Two other subspecies exist: Sternula nereis nereis, which breeds in western and southern Australia, and S. n. exsul, which breeds in New Caledonia. Fairy terns were first described from the Bass Strait in Australia in 1843. The New Zealand subspecies was first identified by Dunedin naturalist Thomas Potts in the Rakaia riverbed in Canterbury; it was breeding in the Rakaia Gorge. He noted there were already two specimens in the collections of Canterbury Museum.

The New Zealand fairy tern is distinguishable from the other two subspecies on the basis of its morphology and behaviour, and has a distinct genetic haplotype. Genetic studies found there was almost no gene flow or migration between the New Zealand and Australian populations.

== Distribution and habitat ==
The New Zealand fairy tern was noted as being common in the late 19th century. However, these records have been suggested as inaccurate as the birds can be difficult to distinguish from little terns. From 1940 to 1983, the New Zealand fairy tern was known to have bred at several sites along the northern coastline of the North Island. Their breeding range extended from Ruakākā, in Northland, to Tauranga in the Bay of Plenty. New Zealand fairy terns were also reportedly found in Canterbury, in the South Island. However, from the mid-1970s, the population declined rapidly. By 1984, New Zealand fairy tern breeding was restricted to three sites in Northland: the Papakanui sandspit in Kaipara Harbour, the Waipu sandspit, and the Mangawhai sandspit.

Currently, New Zealand fairy terns still occupy these breeding sites, with the addition of a new breeding site in 2012 at the Te Arai Stream mouth, south of Mangawhai. Forest & Bird is working to establish an alternative breeding site on the Kaipara harbour. In August 2018, the Department of Conservation and the New Zealand Defence Force worked to build a nest site ahead of the breeding season at Papakanui.

== Ecology ==
Unlike other species of terns which forage in the open ocean, the New Zealand fairy tern is not a plunge diver, but instead feeds in the top 5–8 cm of the water; it can capture prey in extremely shallow water such as estuaries and tidal pools. Adult birds have been observed feeding gobies (Favonigobius lentiginosus and F. exquisitus) and flounders (Rhombosolea sp.) to their chicks, and adult diet may include a substantial number of shrimps. Birds were observed foraging in Te Arai Stream, the mouth of which is a popular flocking for post-breeding fairy terns, but appeared to be getting most of their food from elsewhere.

== Breeding ==
Courtship begins in September, with egg laying occurring between late October and early January. Birds typically lay 1–2 eggs per nest.

Nests are small unlined scrapes in the sand and are roped off and monitored by The Department of Conservation. The nests are constructed near white, grey and orange shell debris to help disguise the eggs and chicks, and are found at least 1 km apart from each other. Guthrie-Smith describes a nest as follows:

"On such a strip, sparsely sprinkled with little heaps of pebbles and surface shells in two and threes, lay the couple of eggs. These surface sea shells had been allowed to remain, as camouflage, untampered with, but from elsewhere had been also collected twenty or thirty other halves and wholes, showing deep lateral widths of purple and pink. Not a brilliantly tinted shell had been missed over the couple of acres I searched. The hen tern had then laid eggs to match the bivalves, the shells bright pink."

Females spend more time incubating eggs than males, while males provide the majority of food to the chicks. The chicks are mobile from hatching, and ready to fully fledge from 30 days old.

They are vulnerable to environmental events, such as storms, high tides, and predation. The encroachment of human activity on their nesting grounds (often, popular beaches) is a major threat to these birds. Beach narrowing, mainly due to housing developments and weed invasion, forces the terns to nest closer to the sea, putting their eggs at risk during storms. Introduced predators and human disturbance also threaten nesting sites.

The wintering range of the birds extends over the Kaipara Harbour. Outside of the breeding season fairy terns form flocks on the harbour, often around Tapora.

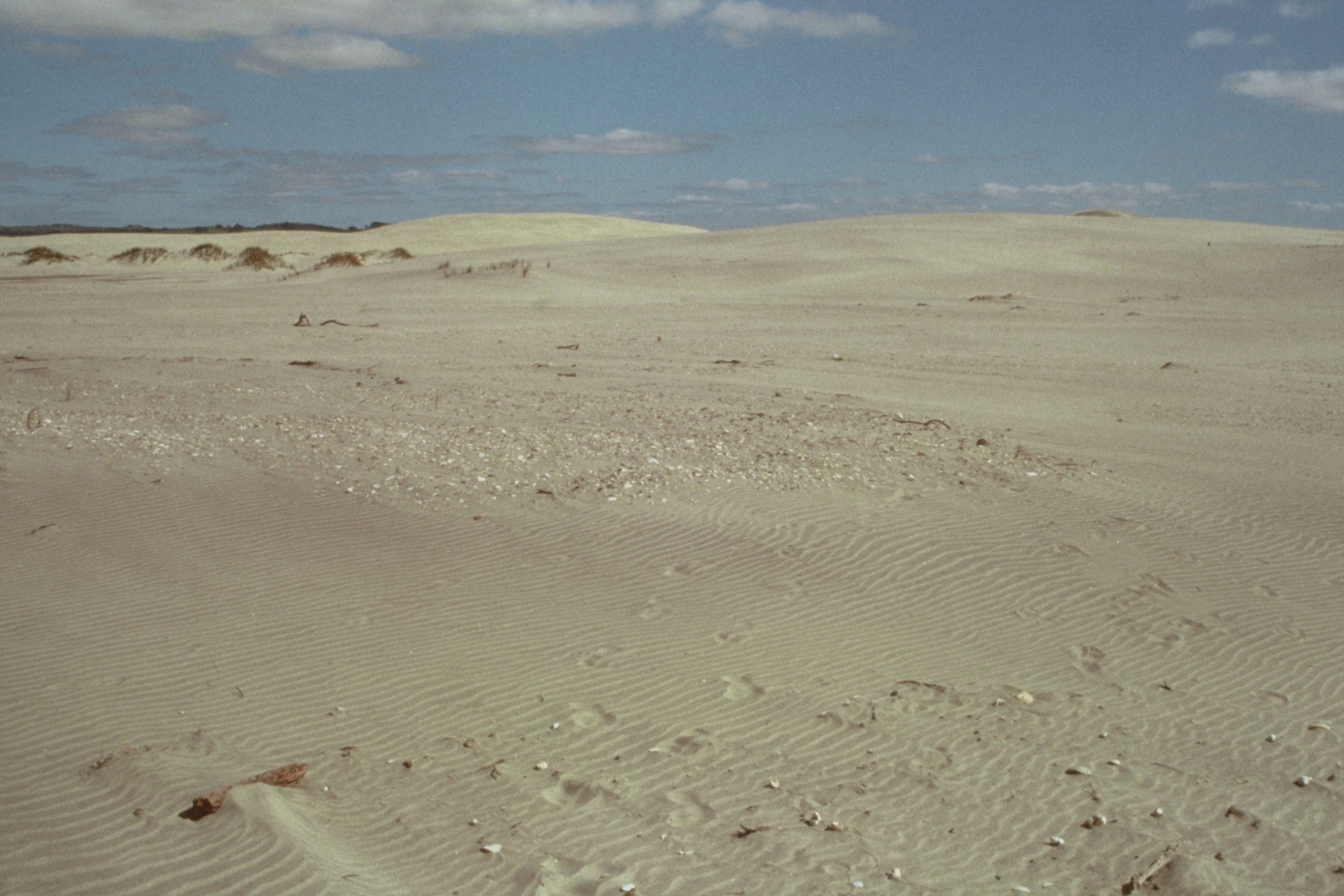
Nesting habitat, Mangawhai

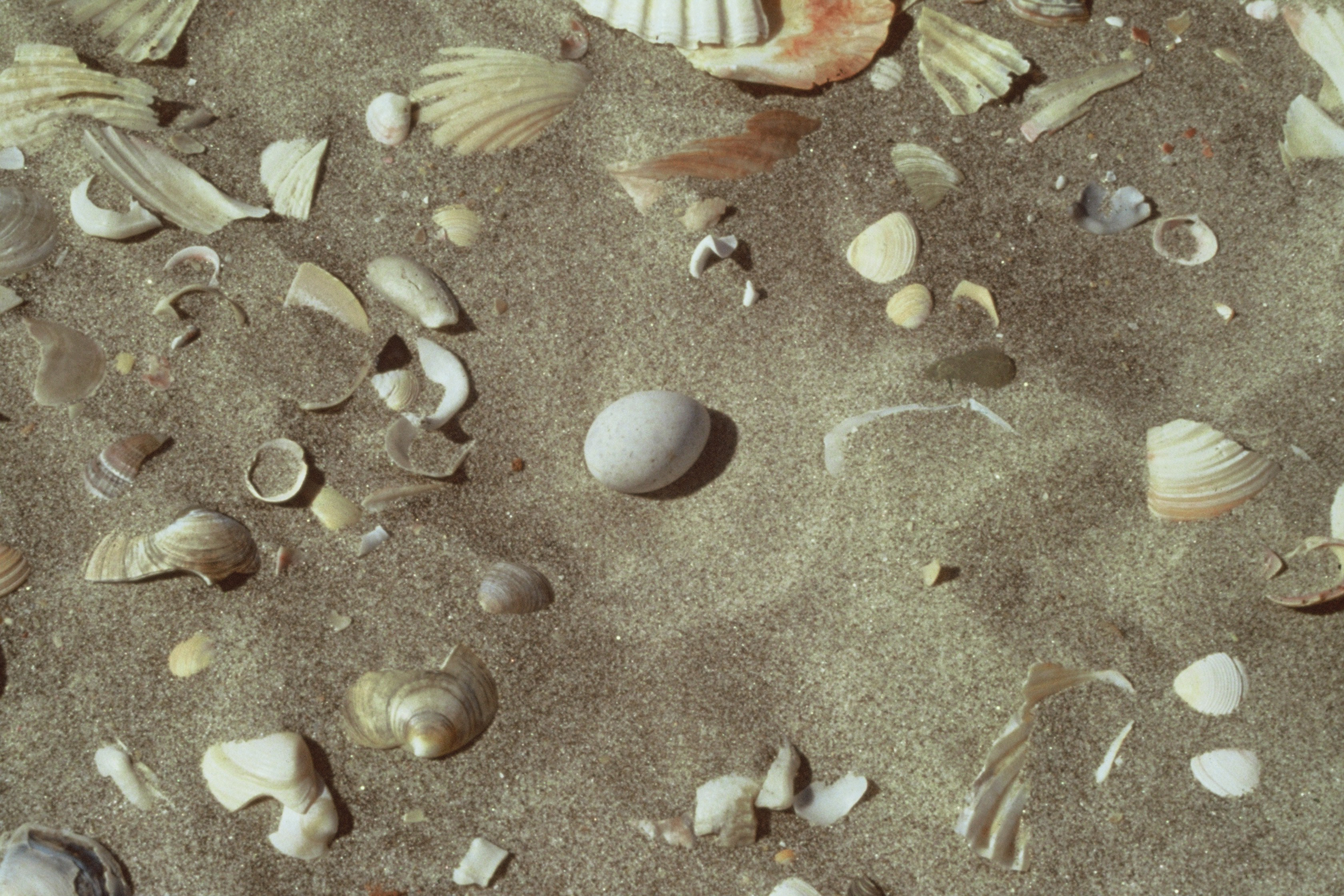
Nest

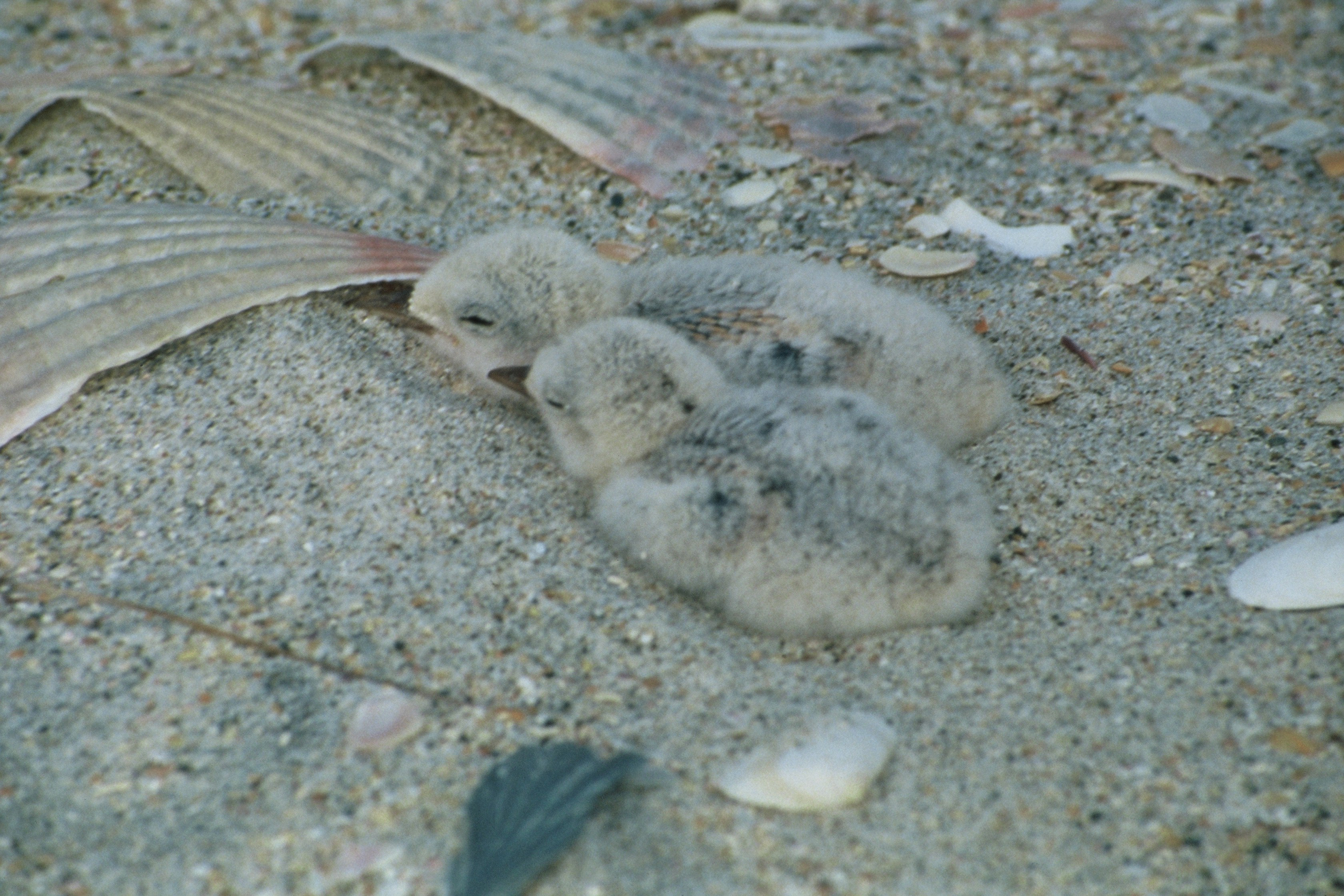
Chicks in nest

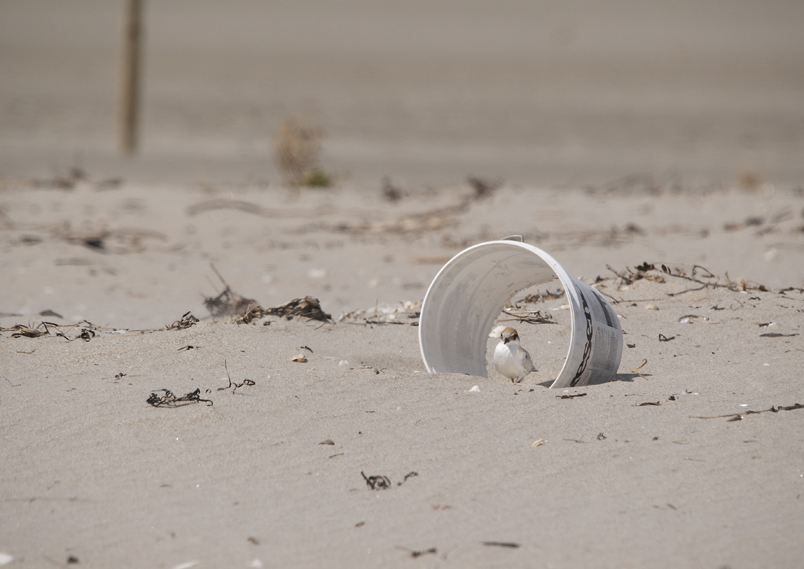
Juvenile using an artificial shelter

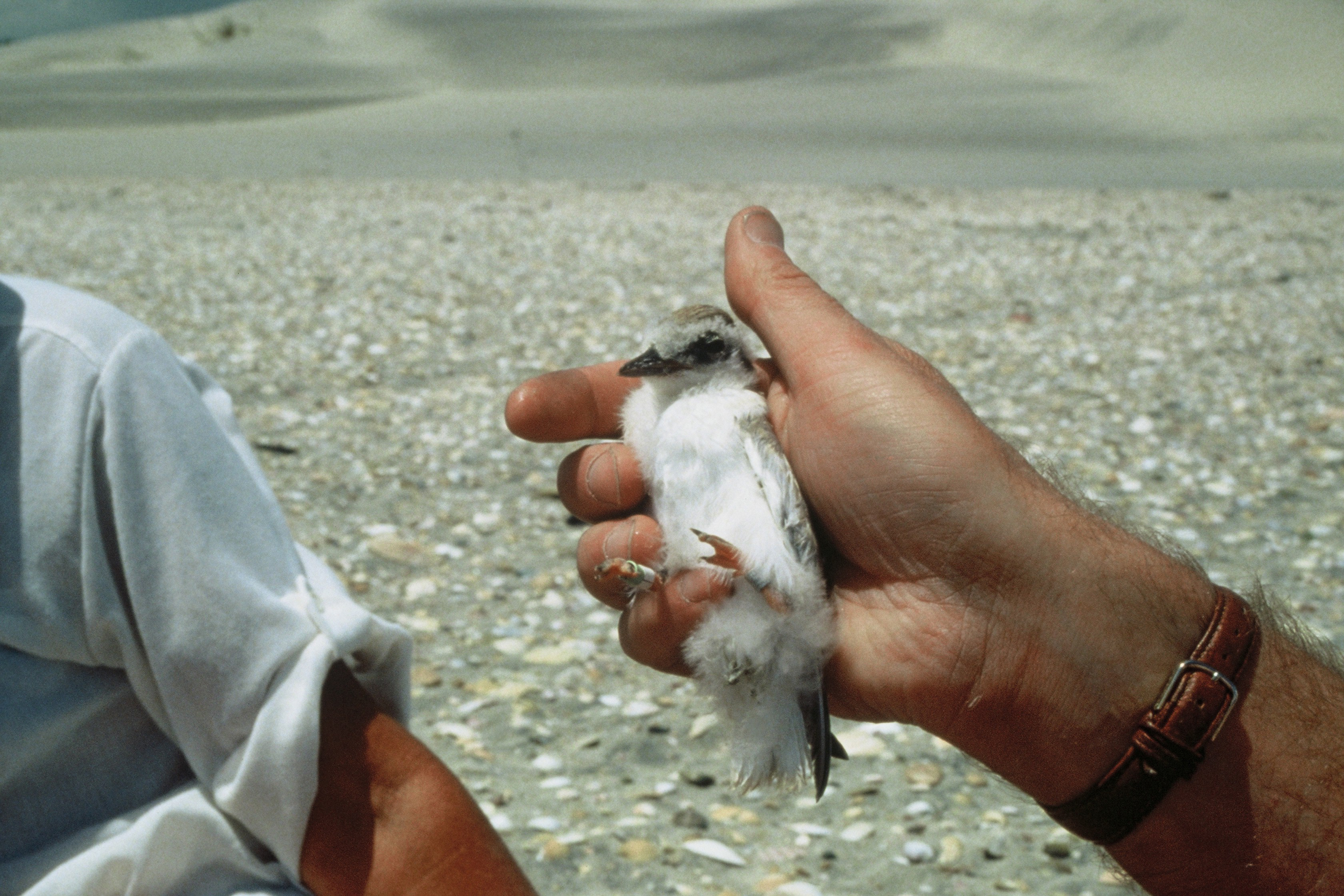
Chick, hand held

== Conservation ==
The number of birds had plummeted to three breeding pairs and eleven individuals by 1983, but intensive conservation efforts were put in place by the New Zealand Wildlife Service. Mangawhai and Papakanui Spit nest sites became protected in 1983, and a site at Waipu in 1994. Numbers increased so that in 1998 the population totalled some 25 to 30 birds with 8 to 10 breeding pairs spread over three breeding sites. Numbers continued to increase due to the Department of Conservation's Recovery Plan, and by 2006 had reached 30 to 40 individuals including 12 breeding pairs. Five years later, numbers were stabilised at 40 to 45 individuals and around 10 breeding pairs. In 2019, there are 45 individuals and approximately 12 breeding pairs.

A fairy tern recovery plan was created in 2005, and aimed to cover strategy over 10 years, but the recovery group was dissolved before the end of that term. During the 2008 breeding season, at least 11 chicks were fledged, although no more than 6 chicks were fledged per season in the decade following. During the 2018/19 breeding season, it was estimated that numbers had dropped to only five breeding pairs, and only 3 chicks hatched, making it "the worst breeding season for 27 years". The Department of Conservation suspected this worsening was partially due to high winds, as well as the appearance of a "mysterious blue substance" on the beach at Waipu. A 2017 review recommended the establishment of a fairy tern recovery group to formulate a strategy for management of the species. This group aims to be in force by March 2019, and research has begun to determine the reasons for the fairy tern's decline.

In the 2006 Birthday Honours Gwenda Pulham was awarded a Queen's Service Medal for her work to protect fairy terns. The New Zealand Fairy Tern Trust, established in 2008, contributes to the conservation effort by donating up to $40,000 annually for predator trapping.

Population, breeding pairs, and fledged chicks: summary
Year	Population estimate	Breeding pairs	Eggs	Fledged chicks
1983	11	3		
1998	25–30	8–10		
2006	30–40	12		
2008				11
2011	40–45	10		
2014			Mangawhai sandspit - 18	
2015			Mangawhai sandspit - 5	
2018/19		5		2
2023/2024	32			
2025	<40			19

== Threats ==
The New Zealand fairy tern has been classified as "Nationally Critical" by the national Department of Conservation (DOC), meaning it is the most severely threatened and facing imminent risk of extinction. The DOC considers that this bird is "probably New Zealand's most endangered indigenous breeding bird." It nests on sand and shell banks just above high tide mark and nesting is highly vulnerable to human development, introduced predators, domestic animals, storms, very high tides and disturbance by humans on foot and in vehicles on the beach. The New Zealand Fairy Tern's habitat is now limited to the lower Northland Peninsula.

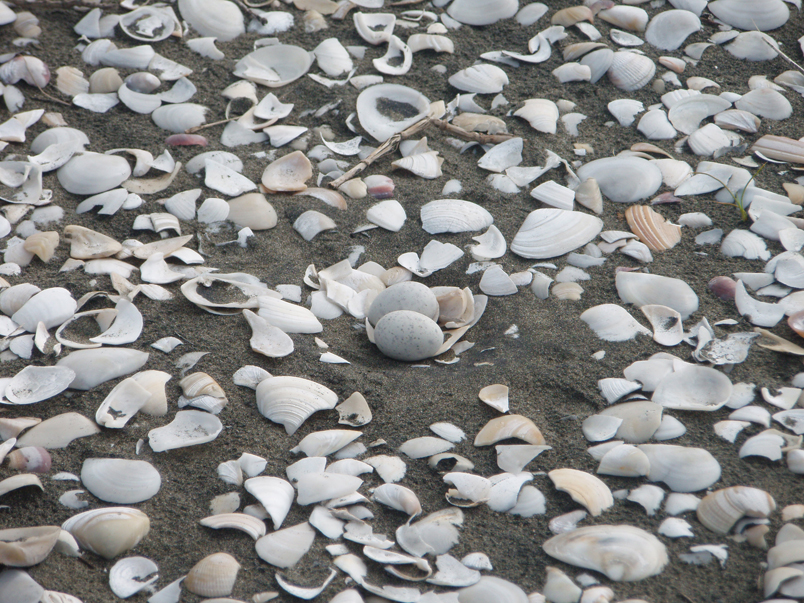
Fairy tern eggs in nest, Pakiri, near Warkworth, January 2009

The Te Arai North Ltd owned Tara Iti Golf Club was built near the fairy terns' nesting area. The bird is further threatened by a proposed residential subdivision at Te Arai, next to one of its prime breeding sites. As part of its Treaty settlement, Te Uri o Hau purchased land in the Mangawhai Forest, and signed a co-governance agreement with developer Te Arai North. Two thousand homes were originally proposed for the development, however after opposition from The Te Arai Beach Preservation Society, Fairy Tern Charitable Trust, and others, this was scaled back to 46 homes and a 196-hectare public park. Disagreement stems from the damming of the Te Arai Stream, interfering with the life cycle of fish said to be key to the diet of fairy-terns.

In 2019, scientists who have been studying fairy terns at Mangawhai on Northland's east coast now suspect the bird's decline may be linked to the removal of mangroves from the harbour.

Following the July 2026 arrival of H5N1 bird flu in New Zealand, epidemiologists fear that the disease could lead to the extinction of the species if it infected the population.
