= Rivière du Nord (Hudson Bay) =

River in Quebec, Canada

Coordinates: 56°32′29″N 76°22′38″W

Location
- Country: Canada
- Province: Québec
- Region: Nord-du-Québec

Physical characteristics
- Source
  - location: Clearwater Lakes, Quebec
- Mouth
  - location: Richmond Gulf

Rivière du Nord (French pronunciation: [ʁivjɛʁ dy nɔʁ]) is a river in the Nunavik, Hudson Bay watershed.
