= Branching =

Branching may refer to:

- Branching (linguistics), the general tendency towards a given order of words within sentences and smaller grammatical units within sentences
- Branching (polymer chemistry), the attachment of side chains to a polymer's backbone chain
- Branching (revision control), a way of duplicating an object under revision control

== See also ==
- Branching process, a kind of stochastic process
- Branch (disambiguation)
