= USS Branch =

USS Branch may refer to the following ships of the United States Navy:

- USS Branch (DD-197), a Clemson-class destroyer commissioned in 1920, transferred to Royal Navy as HMS Beverley, and sunk by U-188 in 1943
- USS Branch (DD-310), a Clemson-class destroyer that was renamed S. P. Lee prior to launch

== See also ==
- USS Branch County (LST-482)
