= Branch (given name) =

Branch is a masculine given name borne by:

- Branch Rickey (1881–1965), American baseball executive
- Branch Rickey Jr. (1914–1961), American baseball executive
- Branch Rickey III (born 1945), American baseball executive
- Branch Russell (1895–1959), American baseball player
