= Waipu River =

Coordinates: 35°59′27″S 174°28′53″E

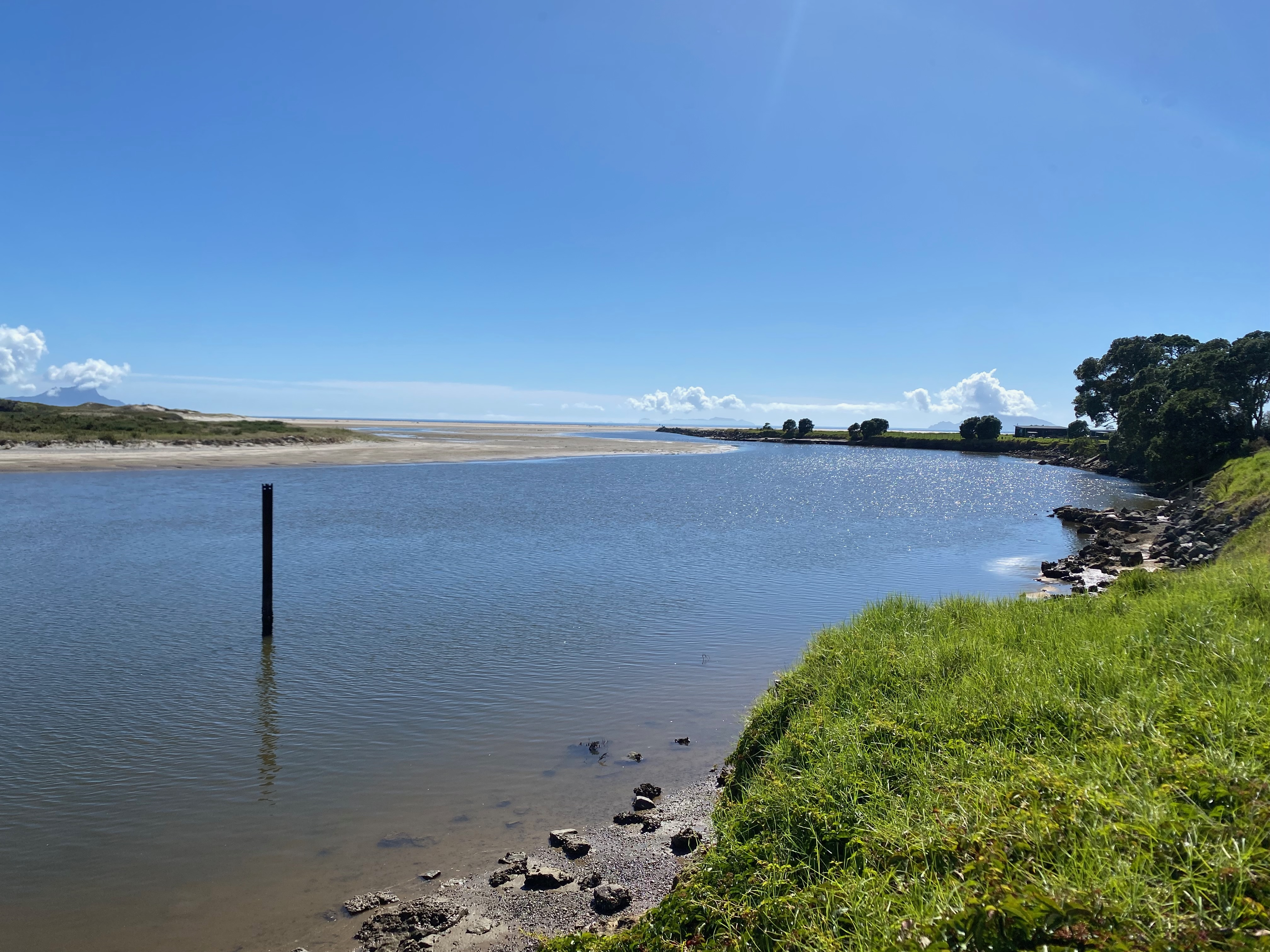
- Course of the Waipu River

Location
- Country: New Zealand

Physical characteristics
- Mouth
  - location: Bream Bay

The Waipu River is a river in the Northland Region of the North Island of New Zealand. It runs close to the town of Waipu. The river is popular with birdwatchers as species such as the New Zealand dotterel, oystercatchers and fairy terns live near it.
