= Pamela Branch =

British author (1920-1967)

- Born: Pamela Jean Byatt; 1920; Ceylon (now Sri Lanka)
- Died: 1967 (aged 46–47)
- Education: Royal Academy of Dramatic Art
- Occupation: novelist
- Known for: The Wooden Overcoat
- Spouses: Newton Branch; James Edward Stuart-Lyon

Pamela Jean Branch (née Byatt, 1920–1967) was a British author of four comic murder mystery novels.

She was born on her parents' tea plantation in Ceylon. She was educated in England, studied art in Paris, and attended the Royal Academy of Dramatic Art in London.

She married the solicitor Newton Branch, and they moved together to Cyprus. She divorced Branch in the late 1950s. In 1962, she married James Edward Stuart-Lyon. In 1967, she died from cancer, aged 47.

== Adaptations ==
Mark Gatiss has adapted two of Branch's novels into one-hour audio dramas first broadcast on BBC Radio 4. Murder Every Monday, starring Simon Williams, was broadcast in 2008, and The Wooden Overcoat, starring David Tennant, in 2009.

== Bibliography ==
=== Novels ===
- The Wooden Overcoat. Robert Hale: London, 1951
- Lion in the Cellar. Robert Hale: London, 1951
- Murder Every Monday. Robert Hale: London, 1954
- Murder's Little Sister. Robert Hale: London, 1958

=== Stage plays ===
- Murder Every Monday (adapted from the novel) by Pamela Branch and Philip Dale. First performed in 1964
