= Justice Branch =

Justice Branch may refer to:

- Edward Thomas Branch (1811–1861), associate justice of the Republic of Texas Supreme Court
- Joseph Branch (judge) (1915–1991), associate justice and chief justice of the North Carolina Supreme Court
- Oliver Winslow Branch (1879–1956), associate justice of the New Hampshire Supreme Court
