= West Branch Township, Dickinson County, Michigan =

West Branch Township, Michigan
- Civil township
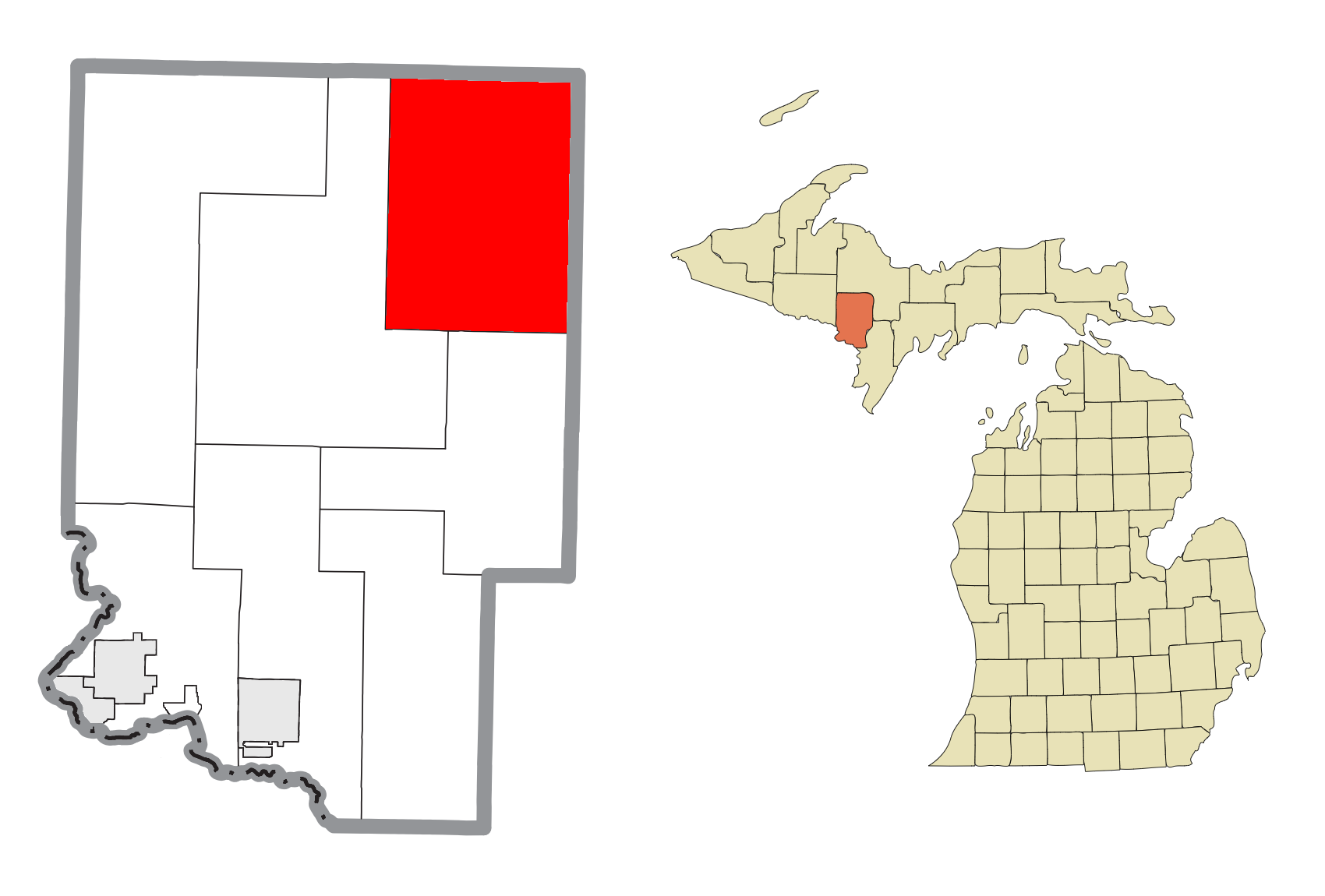
- Location within Dickinson County

- Location within the state of Michigan West Branch Township (the United States)
- Coordinates: 46°08′54″N 87°43′30″W
- Country: United States
- State: Michigan
- County: Dickinson

Government
  - Supervisor: Penny Skogman
  - Clerk: Lisa Jacobsen

Area
  - Total: 111.85 sq mi (289.69 km^{2})
  - Land: 111.46 sq mi (288.68 km^{2})
  - Water: 0.39 sq mi (1.01 km^{2})
- Elevation: 1,158 ft (353 m)

Population (2020)
  - Total: 51
  - Density: 0.46/sq mi (0.18/km^{2})
- Time zone: UTC-6 (Central (CST))
  - Summer (DST): UTC-5 (CDT)
- ZIP code(s): 49831 (Felch); 49841 (Gwinn); 49877 (Ralph)
- Area code: 906
- FIPS code: 26-85520
- GNIS feature ID: 1627245

West Branch Township is a civil township of Dickinson County in the U.S. state of Michigan. The population was 51 at the 2020 census.

With a population density of only 0.458/sq mi (0.177/km^{2}), the township ranks as the least-densely populated municipality in the state of Michigan. It is also the third least-populated after Pointe Aux Barques Township (15) and Grand Island Township (35).

== Geography ==
According to the U.S. Census Bureau, the township has a total area of 111.85 square miles (289.69 km^{2}), of which 111.46 square miles (288.68 km^{2}) is land and 0.39 square miles (1.01 km^{2}) (0.35%) is water.

The north and main branches of the Ford River flow through the township, as does the west branch of the Escanaba River.

The township is served by North Dickinson County Schools to the southwest in the community of Felch.

== Communities ==
- Alfred is an unincorporated community within the township at 46°05′02″N 87°37′57″W. It lis located near where the north branch of the Ford River joins the main branch. Alfred was settled around 1903 as a station along the Chicago, Minneapolis, and St. Paul Railroad. A post office operated here from December 8, 1903 until November 15, 1910.
- Ralph is an unincorporated community within the township at 46°06′31″N 87°47′01″W. The community as settled in 1901 as a station along the Escanaba and Lake Superior Railroad. It was named for Ralph Wells, who was the son of lumberman J. W. Wells from Menominee. A post office opened on January 17, 1901 with the name Bryden, and it was renamed Ralph on June 6, 1904. The Ralph post office closed in 2012.

== Demographics ==
As of the census of 2000, there were 67 people, 29 households, and 18 families residing in the township. By 2020, its population was 51.
