= Ford River (Michigan) =

Tributary of Little Bay de Noc in Delta County, Upper Peninsula of Michigan

Location
- Country: United States
- State: Michigan
- County: Delta

Physical characteristics
- Source: Interior uplands and wetlands, Pickerel lake
  - location: Dickinson County, Michigan, U.S.
- Mouth: Little Bay de Noc
  - location: Delta County, Michigan, U.S.

The Ford River is a stream in Delta County on Michigan’s Upper Peninsula. It flows generally south and southeast through mixed forest and glacial lakeplain to enter Little Bay de Noc on Lake Michigan. It was previously labelled as Fort River in various colonial maps of Michigan.

== Course ==
Headwaters arise in interior wetlands and small lakes in north-central Delta County. From there the river meanders across low-relief terrain, gathering short tributaries and crossing areas of alder wetland and mixed conifer–hardwood forest before reaching Little Bay de Noc along the Lake Michigan shoreline near the unincorporated community of Ford River.

== Natural history ==
=== Geology and landforms ===
The basin occupies glacial sediments of the northern Lake Michigan lakeplain. Sandy and gravelly deposits with occasional peat pockets create a gentle gradient, producing cutbanks, small point bars, and seasonal floodplain backwaters near the mouth.

=== Plants and wildlife ===
Upland forests include northern hardwoods (sugar maple, birch, aspen) and conifers (white pine, hemlock, spruce–fir). Riparian zones support alder thickets, cedar swales, and sedge meadows. Cool spring inputs in upper reaches and warmer nearshore waters at the bay margin support a mix of cold-, cool-, and warm-water fishes typical of Little Bay de Noc tributaries.

== See also ==
- List of rivers of Michigan
- Little Bay de Noc
