= South Branch, Michigan =

- Unincorporated community
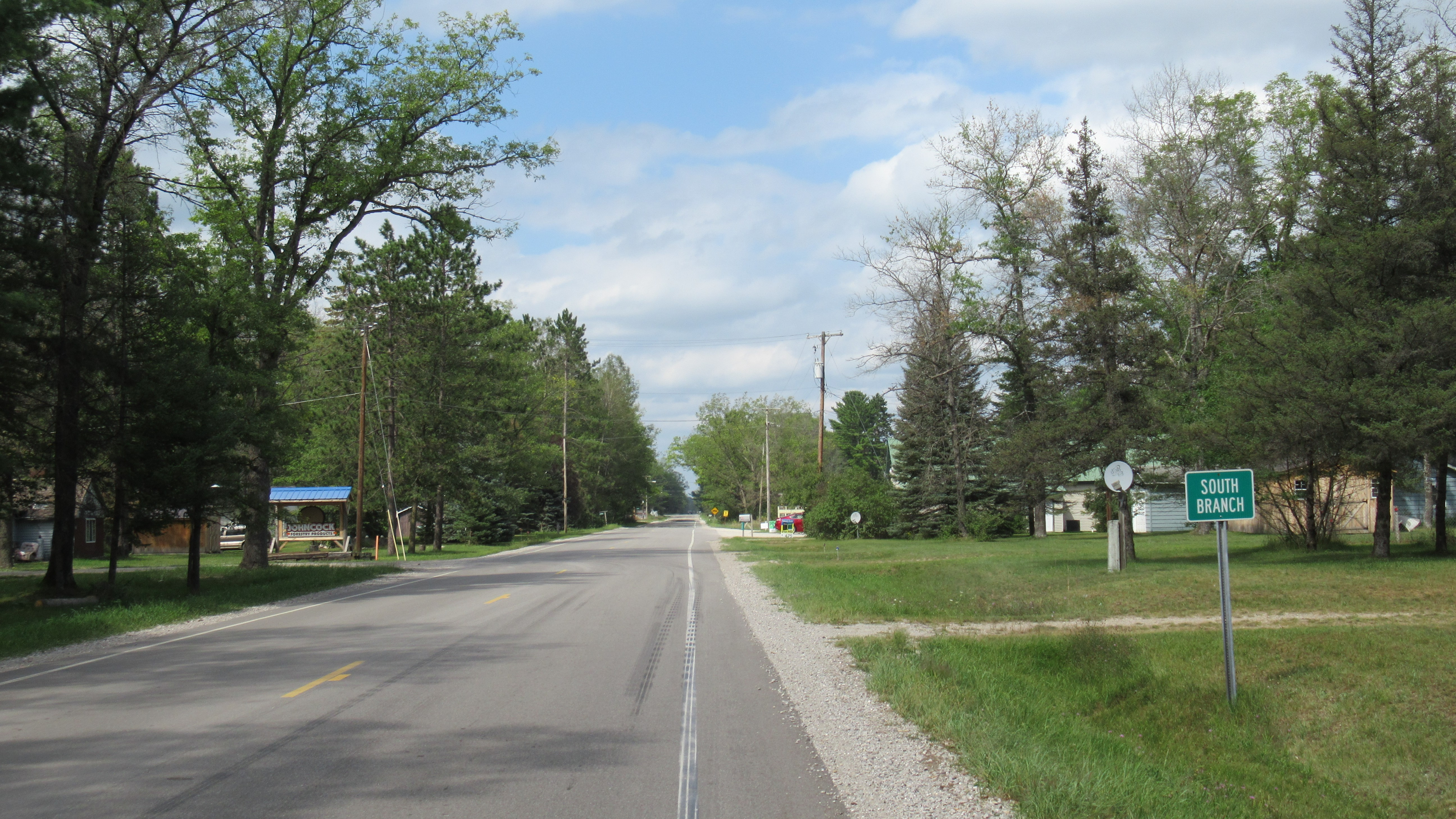
- Looking north along E. County Line Road

- Location within the state of Michigan Location within the United States
- Coordinates: 44°28′00″N 83°53′20″W
- Country: United States
- State: Michigan
- County: Iosco and Ogemaw
- Township: Goodar and Plainfield
- Established: 1887
- Elevation: 935 ft (285 m)
- Time zone: UTC-5 (Eastern (EST))
  - Summer (DST): UTC-4 (EDT)
- ZIP code(s): 48761
- Area code: 989
- GNIS feature ID: 1621678

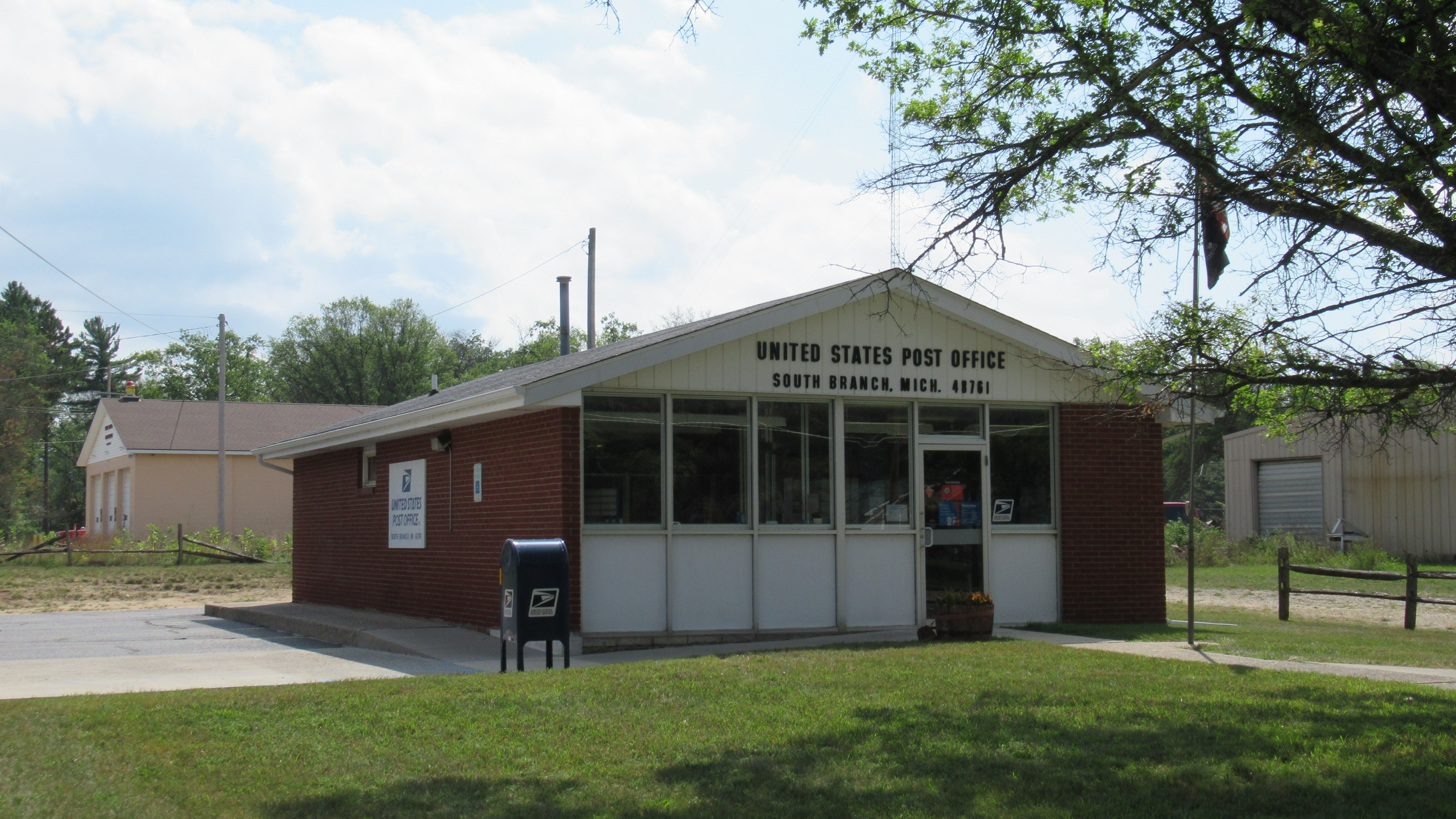
U.S. Post Office in South Branch

South Branch is an unincorporated community in the U.S. state of Michigan. The community is primarily located within Goodar Township, Ogemaw County, although a small portion extends east into Plainfield Township, Iosco County. As an unincorporated community, South Branch has no legally defined boundaries, population statistics, or administrative powers of its own; however, a post office operates out of the community, with ZIP Code 48761.

== History ==
The community of South Branch was established in 1887, and was given a post office in 1889 with the name "Hunt". The post office was renamed South Branch in 1893. The community briefly had a station on the Detroit and Mackinac Railway.
