= West Branch Township =

West Branch Township may refer to:

== Iowa ==
- West Branch Township, Sioux County, Iowa, in Sioux County, Iowa

== Kansas ==
- West Branch Township, Marion County, Kansas

== Michigan ==
- West Branch Township, Dickinson County, Michigan
- West Branch Township, Marquette County, Michigan
- West Branch Township, Missaukee County, Michigan
- West Branch Township, Ogemaw County, Michigan

== Pennsylvania ==
- West Branch Township, Pennsylvania

== See also ==
- West Branch (disambiguation)
