= Thomas H. Branch =

American Seventh-day Adventist missionary

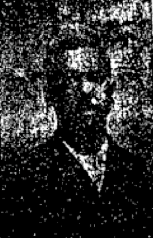
- Branch in 1902
- Born: December 24, 1856; Jefferson County, Missouri, US
- Died: November 24, 1924 (aged 67); Los Angeles, California, US
- Occupation(s): Preacher and missionary
- Known for: First African American to visit British Central Africa

Thomas H. Branch (December 24, 1856 – November 24, 1924) was an American Seventh-day Adventist missionary. He worked in a variety of roles for the Denver and Rio Grande Western Railroad before joining the Seventh-day Adventist Church (SDA) and serving as a missionary in Colorado. Branch was selected for service in the British Central Africa Protectorate in 1902 and travelled to Africa with his wife Henrietta and three of their children. En-route he was detained for nine days by the British consul at Chinde, Portuguese Mozambique as the consul was concerned that a black missionary would cause insubordination among Africans in the colony. After his release Branch entered British Central Africa and established a mission station at Cholo in the Shire Highlands. He served as superintendent of the station, with Ethiopianist Joseph Booth running the administration and Branch's wife and daughters working as teachers.

Branch was characterised as militant by the local press, though he opposed Booth's radical aims. The SDA agreed to withdraw Booth and Branch after the colonial government raised concerns; Branch's replacement was more politically acceptable to the colonial administration. After a brief period in South Africa the Branch family returned to the United States where he worked with the African American communities in Denver and Philadelphia. Henrietta died in 1913 and Branch afterwards married Lucy Baylor. She left him after Branch refused to follow the teachings of Alonzo T. Jones and he moved to California, where he lived out his final years with his daughter.

== Early life ==
Thomas H. Branch was born on December 24, 1856, in Jefferson County, Missouri in the United States; his parents were both slaves, though Thomas was born free. He was educated at H. M. Van Slyke's school for freed slaves and afterwards worked as a porter, cook and steward with the Denver and Rio Grande Western Railroad. Branch married Henrietta Paterson at Kansas City on December 7, 1876. A daughter, Mabel, was born in Wyandotte County, Kansas on April 1, 1878. Later that year the family moved to Denver, Colorado. Three sons were born there: Thomas in June 1887, Paul in March 1891 and Robert in January 1896. Branch rose to become a brakeman of the railroad's trains and, after negotiating with his employer to have Sundays off work, became a lay preacher. Mabel attended West Denver High School and went on to become the first African American teacher in Colorado. Branch became a missionary with the Seventh-day Adventist church (SDA) and, in 1901, was sent to Pueblo, Colorado as a missionary. He established the first SDA African American congregation in the city.

== Service in British Central Africa ==
In 1902 the SDA church selected Branch as a missionary to the British Central Africa Protectorate, in what is now Malawi. He was the first African American missionary for the SDA in Africa, and probably the first sent overseas by the church. In preparation for the mission, Henrietta received medical training and Branch was ordained by the church on May 22, 1902. Branch was older than most SDA missionaries but had been recommended for the mission by the church's Colorado Conference. The conference provided financial support to the mission, which was the SDA's first in the Protectorate.

Branch, Henrietta, Mabel, Paul and Robert boarded a ship at New York on June 4, 1902, for the United Kingdom. The family arrived in London on June 12 and stayed at Duncombe Hall, which was used at the time by the SDA. The family of Joseph Booth also stayed in the hall. The Booths would accompany the Branch family to Africa and help run the mission there. The missionaries left London on June 27 for Southampton, where they boarded a vessel for Chinde, Portuguese Mozambique.

Upon arrival at Chinde Branch was detained for nine days by the British consul. The consul feared that educated African American missionaries would encourage independent thought and insubordination among the Africans of the protectorate and cause political instability. Booth spent three days trying to persuade the consul that Branch posed no threat. The Branches also experienced discrimination from local Adventists who refused to give them room in their houses, forcing them to take residence in a hotel. Branch was eventually granted permission to continue; he and his family left Chinde on August 14 and arrived at Cholo in the Shire Highlands, the site of the mission station, on August 29. In doing so, he became the first African American to visit British Central Africa.

The mission station at Cholo had been purchased by the SDA from the Seventh Day Baptists, with whom Booth had previously been affiliated. The station was named Plainfield after Plainfield, New Jersey where the SDA had their headquarters. Branch was appointed superintendent and had responsibility for the religious and educational work, while Booth looked after administrative tasks. Henrietta and Mabel worked as teachers at the mission, which opened a school for 25 students in the first week of operation, with lessons being held initially in the open air. By 1907 the school had expanded to 75 pupils and two outreach schools had been established in nearby villages. By the end of Branch's tenure at the mission, the school had 112 pupils. Branch picked up the local language and was well liked by his congregation; he formally founded the first Adventist Church in the protectorate on July 14, 1906.

== Withdrawal ==
Branch protested against the mistreatment of Africans in the protectorate, and because of this was characterised as a militant in the local press. He also quickly began to disagree with Booth's Ethiopianist goals. The colonial government's fears were heightened after the 1906 Bambatha Rebellion in South Africa and the SDA, keen to maintain good relations, agreed to withdraw the Booths. Booth was replaced by Joseph H. Watson, but he died soon afterwards, leaving the Branch family to run the mission alone. Despite his opposition to Ethiopianism and his general conservatism, the SDA, keen to reassure the colonial government of their loyalty, replaced Branch with a white American, Joel C. Rogers. Rogers, with experience of missionary work in South Africa and attitudes towards Africans that were more in line with those of Europeans, was considered more acceptable by the government of the protectorate.

Branch and his family were in South Africa by September 1907. They found their sons were prevented from attending the Adventist schools in the state, as they were segregated for whites only. The family returned to the United States in 1908 as Henrietta suffered from fevers.

== Later life ==
Upon his return to the United States, Branch was placed in charge of the SDA's work with African Americans in Denver. He moved to Philadelphia in 1910 where he set up the first African American SDA church in the city. This church developed into the Ebenezer SDA Church and established almost a dozen daughter churches in the city. Branch and Henrietta, together with Dr James Hyatt, lectured and distributed pamphlets across Philadelphia. Henrietta died on April 4, 1913; Branch was badly affected by her death. Branch's sons, unable to pursue an education, had left to join the army and Branch was in poor health, suffering from the aftereffects of malaria.

Branch subsequently married Lucy Baylor, who was much younger than him and already had a 5-year-old daughter. Baylor left him shortly afterwards when Branch refused to join her in following the teachings of Alonzo T. Jones. Branch moved to Watts, California as a preacher before the SDA church approved a pension to allow him to retire. The church leadership had recently become dominated by the East Pennsylvania Conference, and it was only reluctantly that they granted Branch his pension. In retirement Branch lived with Mabel's family in Los Angeles where he died on November 24, 1924.
