= South Branch Township =

South Branch Township may refer to:

- South Branch Township, Crawford County, Michigan
- South Branch Township, Wexford County, Michigan
- South Branch Township, Watonwan County, Minnesota
- South Branch Township, Nance County, Nebraska

== See also ==
- South Branch (disambiguation)
