= South Branch =

South Branch may refer to:

== Populated places ==
- South Branch, Minnesota, an unincorporated community in Watonwan County
- South Branch, Michigan, an unincorporated community in Ogemaw County
- South Branch, New Brunswick, Canada
- South Branch, New Jersey, an unincorporated community in Somerset County
- South Branch, Newfoundland and Labrador, Canada

== Waterways ==
- South Branch (New York), a stream in Herkimer County
- South Branch Newport Creek, a tributary of Newport Creek in Luzerne County, Pennsylvania
- South Branch Raritan River, a tributary of the Raritan River in New Jersey
- South Branch of the Chicago River

== Other uses ==
- (transportation) South Branch, a Norfolk Southern Railway line

== See also ==
- South Branch Township (disambiguation)
