= List of justices of the New Hampshire Supreme Court =

Following is a list of justices of the New Hampshire Supreme Court:

== List of chief justices of the Superior Court of Judicature (1776–1876) ==
- Meshech Weare (1776–1782)
- Samuel Livermore (1782–1790)
- Josiah Bartlett (1790)
- John Pickering (1790–1795)
- Simeon Olcott (1795–1802)
- Jeremiah Smith (1802–1809)
- Arthur Livermore (1809–1813)
- Jeremiah Smith (1813–1816)
- William M. Richardson (1816–1838)
- Joel Parker (1838–1848)
- John Gilchrist (1848–1855)
- Andrew Salter Woods (1855)
- Ira Perley (1855–1859)
- Samuel Dana Bell (1859–1864)
- Ira Perley (1864–1869)
- Henry Adams Bellows (1869–1873)
- J. Everett Sargent (1873–1874)
- Edmund L. Cushing (1874–1876)

== List of chief justices of the Supreme Court (1876–present) ==
- Charles Cogswell Doe (1876–1896)
- Alonzo P. Carpenter (1896–1898)
- Lewis W. Clark (1898)
- Isaac N. Blodgett (1898–1902)
- Frank Nesmith Parsons (1902–1924)
- Robert J. Peaslee (1924–1934)
- John E. Allen (1934–1943)
- Thomas L. Marble (1943–1946)
- Oliver Winslow Branch (1946–1949)
- Francis Wayland Johnston (1949–1952)
- Frank R. Kenison (1952–1977)
- Edward John Lampron (1978–1979)
- William Alvan Grimes (1979–1981)
- John W. King (1981–1986)
- David A. Brock (1986–2004)
- John T. Broderick Jr. (2004–2010)
- Linda Dalianis (2010–2018)
- Robert J. Lynn (2018–2019)
- Gary Hicks (acting, 2019-2021)
- Gordon J. MacDonald (2021–2026)

== All justices ==
Judge	Began active service	Ended active service
William H. H. Allen	1876	1893
John E. Allen	1924	1943
William King Atkinson	1803	1805
Josiah Bartlett	1782	1790
William Henry Bartlett	1861	1867
James P. Bassett	2012	2025
William F. Batchelder	1981	1995
Samuel Bell	1816	1819
Samuel Dana Bell	1849	1864
Henry Adams Bellows	1859	1873
George A. Bingham	1876; 1884	1880; 1891
George H. Bingham	1902	1913
Amos Noyes Blandin Jr.	1947	1966
Isaac N. Blodgett	1880	1902
Maurice Paul Bois	1976	1983
Oliver Winslow Branch	1926	1949
David A. Brock	1978	2003
John T. Broderick Jr.	1995	2010
Henri Alphonse Burque	1941	1947
Alonzo P. Carpenter	1881	1898
William Martin Chase	1891	1907
Clifton Clagett	1812	1813
Lewis Whitehouse Clark	1877	1898
Carol Ann Conboy	2009	2017
Melissa Beth Countway	2024	Incumbent
Edmund L. Cushing	1874	1876
Linda Dalianis	2000	2018
Charles Cogswell Doe	1859; 1876	1874; 1896
Patrick E. Donovan	2018	Incumbent
Chuck Douglas	1977	1985
John Dudley	1784	1797
James E. Duggan	2001	2011
Laurence Ilsley Duncan	1946	1976
Ira Allen Eastman	1849	1859
Caleb Ellis	1813	1816
Richard Evans	1809	1813
Timothy Farrar	1791	1802
William Lawrence Foster	1869; 1876	1874; 1881
Asa Fowler	1855	1861
John Gilchrist	1840	1855
Richard E. Galway	2004	2009
John Richard Goodnow	1952	1957
Bryan Gould	2025	Incumbent
Samuel Green	1819	1840
Robert Frederick Griffith	1967	1976
William Alvan Grimes	1966	1981
John Harris	1823	1833
Ellery Albee Hibbard	1873	1874
Gary E. Hicks	2006	2023
Sherman D. Horton Jr.	1990	2000
Leverett Hubbard	1763	1784
William Johnson	1985	1999
Francis Wayland Johnston	1943	1952
Frank R. Kenison	1946	1977
John W. King	1979	1986
William S. Ladd	1870	1876
Edward John Lampron	1949	1979
Woodbury Langdon	1782; 1786	1783; 1791
Arthur Livermore	1799	1816
Edward St. Loe Livermore	1797	1799
Samuel Livermore	1782	1790
Robert J. Lynn	2010	2019
Gordon J. MacDonald	2021	2026
Thomas L. Marble	1925	1946
Anna Hantz Marconi	2017	2026
Joseph P. Nadeau	2000	2005
George Washington Nesmith	1859	1870
Daniel Newcomb	1796	1798
Simeon Olcott	1790	1801
Elwin L. Page	1934	1946
Joel Parker	1833	1848
Frank Nesmith Parsons	1895	1924
Robert J. Peaslee	1898; 1908	1901; 1934
Ira Perley	1855; 1864	1859; 1869
John Pickering	1790	1795
Robert G. Pike	1896	1901
William Alberto Plummer	1913	1925
James W. Remick	1901	1904
William M. Richardson	1816	1838
J. Everett Sargent	1859	1874
George Yeaton Sawyer	1855	1859
Aaron W. Sawyer	1876	1877
Jeremiah Smith	1802; 1813	1809; 1816
Jeremiah Smith Jr.	1867	1875
Isaac W. Smith	1874; 1877	1876; 1895
Leslie Perkins Snow	1921	1932
David Souter	1983	1990
Clinton Warrington Stanley	1876	1884
Jonathan Steele	1810	1812
W. Stephen Thayer III	1986	2000
Ebenezer Thompson	1795	1796
Matthew Thornton	1776	1782
Nathaniel Gookin Upham	1833	1842
Reuben E. Walker	1901	1921
Robert M. Wallace	1893	1901
Meshech Weare	1747	1782
John Wentworth	1776	1781
Stephen Morse Wheeler	1957	1967
William Whipple	1783	1785
Leonard Wilcox	1838; 1848	1840; 1850
Daniel Will	2026	Incumbent
Paine Wingate	1798	1809
Levi Woodbury	1817	1823
Peter Woodbury	1933	1941
Andrew Salter Woods	1840	1855
John E. Young	1898; 1904	1901; 1925
