= Goodnow =

Goodnow may refer to:

== Places in the United States ==
- Goodnow, Wisconsin
- Goodnow House, Manhattan, Kansas
- Merton S. Goodnow House, Hutchinson, Minnesota
- Goodnow Library, Sudbury, Massachusetts
- Goodnow Mountain, Adirondacks, New York

== People with the surname ==
- Chris Goodnow (born 1959), professor and Australian immunologist
- David Goodnow (born 1939), American television journalist
- Edward Samuel Goodnow (1874–1939)
- Frank Johnson Goodnow (1859–1939), American educator and legal scholar
- Isaac Goodnow (1814–1894), abolitionist and co-founder of Kansas State University
- Jacqueline Jarrett Goodnow (1924–2014), cognitive and developmental psychologist
- John Goodnow (1858–1907), American businessman and diplomat
- John Richard Goodnow (1906–1972), justice of the New Hampshire Supreme Court
- Minnie Goodnow (1871–1952), American nurse

== See also ==
- Goodenow (disambiguation)
- Goodnow Hall (disambiguation)
