= Robert J. Peaslee =

American judge (1864–1936)

Robert James Peaslee (September 24, 1864 – August 23, 1936) was an American lawyer and judge who served as a justice of the New Hampshire Supreme Court from 1898 to 1901 and from 1908 to 1934, serving as chief justice from 1924 to 1934.

== Early life, education, and career ==
Born in Weare, New Hampshire, the son of Robert and Persis B. (Dodge) Peaslee, he attended the common schools of his native town, Cushing Academy in Ashburnham, Massachusetts, and Arms Academy in Shelburne Falls, Massachusetts. He received his law degree from Boston University School of Law, from which he graduated with high honors in 1886. He gained admission to the bar in 1886 and practiced law in Manchester, New Hampshire, where "in the comparatively few years of his practice he came to be recognized as one of the leaders of the Hillsborough bar". He was also a lecturer in municipal and constitutional law at Dartmouth College for two years during this time.

== Judicial service and later life ==
In the spring of 1898, following the retirement of long-serving justice Lewis W. Clark, Peaslee received strong endorsements for appointment to the position from around the state, particularly from the bar of Hillsborough County. Governor George A. Ramsdell, himself a member of the Hillsborough bar, appointed Peaslee to the seat in 1898.

In 1901, the court was reconfigured, and Governor Chester B. Jordan was enabled to appoint an entirely new court. The governor retained most of the justices from the previous configuration of the court, but removed Peaslee and Robert G. Pike from the supreme court to the superior court, appointing James W. Remick and Reuben E. Walker to their respective seats on the supreme court.

In 1908, Governor Charles M. Floyd returned Peaslee to the supreme court, to a seat vacated by the retirement of Justice William M. Chase, who was statutorily required to retire upon reaching his 70th birthday. While on the court, Peaslee also served as a lecturer on domestic relations for his alma mater, the Boston University School of Law. In 1923, Peaslee was president of the New Hampshire Bar Association.

In 1924, Governor Fred H. Brown nominated Peaslee to become chief justice of the New Hampshire Supreme Court after Justice John E. Young declined the appointment. Peaslee succeeded Chief Justice Frank N. Parsons upon Parsons's retirement later that year, and remained chief justice until his own retirement from the court on September 21, 1934.

Following his departure from the court, Peaslee was advisory counsel of a law firm in Concord, where he participated in some of the hearings on the Amoskeag Mills bankruptcy case, and was elected a trustee of the Amoskeag Manufacturing Company. In 1935, Peaslee denounced the New Deal administration as "robber-barrons" over the assertedly unconstitutional taxation of certain New England manufacturers. Peaslee contended that legislation supported by the administration would unconstitutionally deprive manufacturers of property.

== Personal life and death ==
On September 12, 1893, he married Nellie Dorcas Kimball, who died in 1915. On February 15, 1917, he married Sarah Congdon Hazard, who survived him.

Peaslee died in a hospital in Boston, at the age of 72, after a long illness.

Political offices
Preceded by Lewis W. Clark; William Martin Chase	Justice of the New Hampshire Supreme Court; 1898–1901; 1908–1924	Succeeded by James W. Remick; John E. Allen
Preceded by Frank Nesmith Parsons	Chief Justice of the New Hampshire Supreme Court; 1924–1934	Succeeded by John E. Allen
