= Frank S. Streeter =

American politician

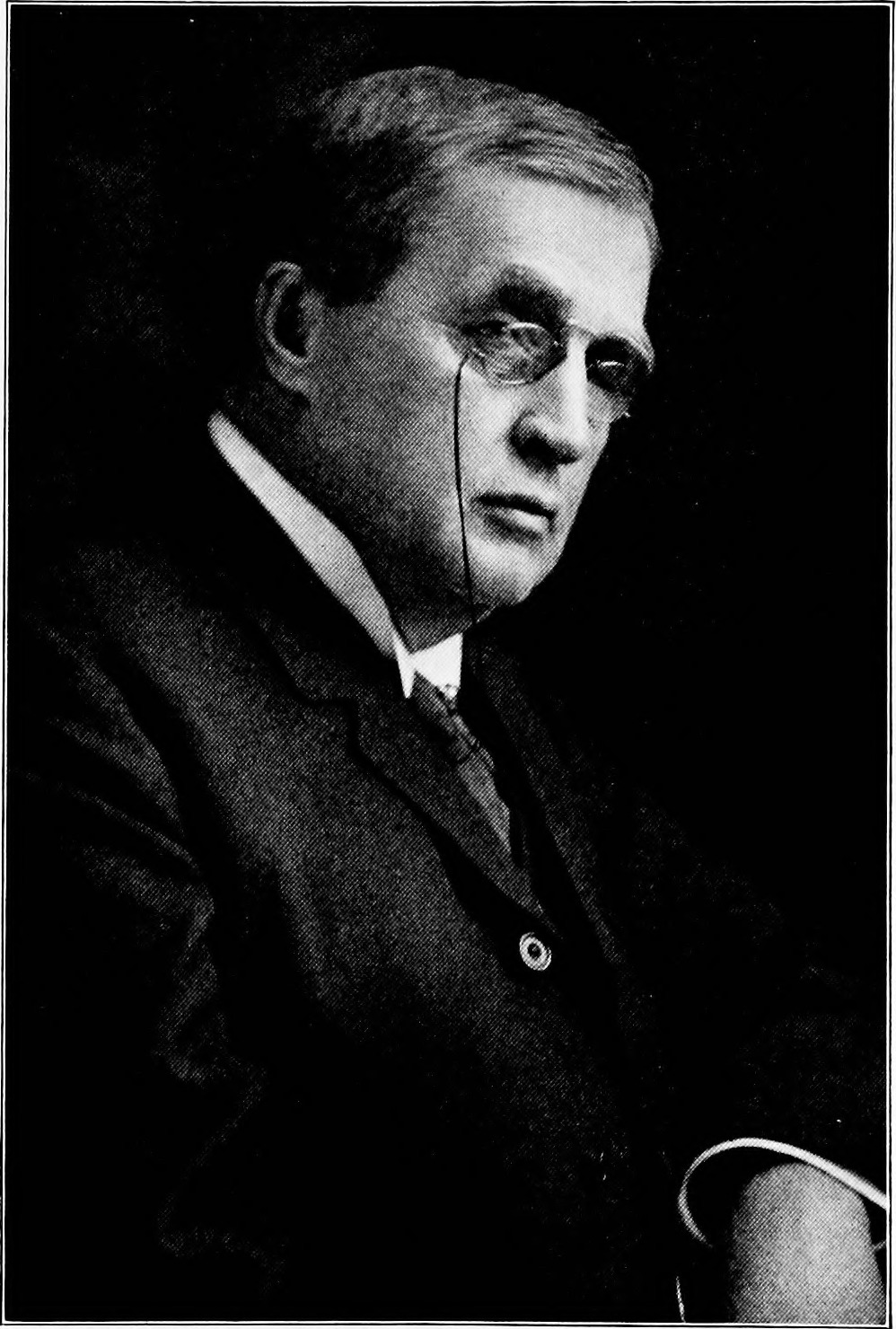
- Born: August 5, 1853; Charleston, Vermont, U.S.
- Died: December 11, 1922 (aged 69)
- Occupations: Lawyer and politician
- Spouse: Lilian Carpenter Streeter
- Children: Thomas and Julia
- Relatives: Ruth Cheney Streeter (daughter-in-law)

Frank Sherwin Streeter (August 5, 1853 - December 11, 1922) was a lawyer and politician from Concord, New Hampshire, and trustee of Dartmouth College.

== Biography ==
Frank Sherwin Streeter was born in Charleston, Vermont, on August 5, 1853, to Daniel and Julia Streeter. He graduated from St. Johnsbury Academy in 1870, and spent a year at Bates College before transferring to Dartmouth College, where he graduated in 1874.

Streeter studied law under Alonzo P. Carpenter, the chief justice of the New Hampshire Supreme Court. He formed a partnership with William Martin Chase before Chase was appointed to the New Hampshire Supreme Court in 1891, at which point Streeter became the head of the firm. Streeter was recognized as a leader of the bar in New Hampshire, and had notable clients such as Western Union; the Amoskeag Manufacturing Company; and the Concord and Montreal Railroad, which later became Boston and Maine Railroad. Streeter was employed by Mary Baker Eddy at various times between 1890 and 1910, including the well publicized Next Friends suit of 1907. Streeter was known for clashing multiple times with William E. Chandler, although as a trustee at Dartmouth he proposed and delivered an honorary doctorate to his noted rival.

Streeter was a Republican and became involved in politics in addition to his law career. In 1885, he began serving on the Judiciary Committee in the New Hampshire Legislature, became President of the New Hampshire Constitutional Convention in 1896, and a member of the Republican National Committee in 1907 and 1908. He also served as judge advocate general on the staff of Governor Charles A. Busiel in 1895 and 1896. He was an active member of the National Security League and the League to Enforce Peace, as well as a number of other committees, clubs, and organizations; a number of which he served as president for. He was appointed by President William Howard Taft in 1911 as a member of the International Joint Commission between the United States and Canada. In 1919 he headed an effort to reform the education system in New Hampshire, creating a statewide board of education setting teaching standards. He also supported building hospitals in Concord.

Streeter died on December 11, 1922. In 1893, George H. Moses wrote that Streeter "stands in the front rank of New Hampshire lawyers." His letters are housed at the New Hampshire Historical Society. Streeter Hall on the Dartmouth College campus, where he served as a trustee for thirty years, was named after him in 1929.

== Personal life ==
In 1877, Streeter married Lilian Carpenter, a social reformer and author and the daughter of his mentor Alonzo P. Carpenter. They had two children together, Julia and Thomas. Thomas Streeter also became a notable New Hampshire lawyer and Dartmouth graduate like his father.

He was a Unitarian.
