= John E. Allen (judge) =

American judge (1873–1945)

John E. Allen (June 26, 1873 – July 24, 1945) was a justice of the New Hampshire Supreme Court from 1924 to 1943, serving as chief justice from 1934 to 1943.

== Biography ==
Born in Claremont, New Hampshire, to William H. and Ellen (Joslin) Allen, he received an undergraduate degree from Dartmouth College in 1894, and a law degree from Harvard Law School in 1898.

After gaining admission to the bar, Keene entered the practice of law in Keene, New Hampshire. He "served as an instructor of Dartmouth college, [and] as Judge of the probate court for Cheshire county".

Allen was appointed to the court in 1924 following the death of Chief Justice Frank Nesmith Parsons, and the elevation of associate justice Robert J. Peaslee to chief justice. Allen served as "associate justice of the Supreme court, and as chief Justice from 1934 until 1943", In 1935, Allen was also president of the New Hampshire Bar Association. again succeeding Peaslee.

== Personal life and death ==
Allen married Amy L. Abbott.

Allen died at Keene, New Hampshire, at the age of 72. Following the death of Allen's wife Amy in 1951, Dartmouth College received a $125,000 bequest from a trust he had established.

Political offices
Preceded by Robert J. Peaslee	Associate Justice of the New Hampshire Supreme Court; 1924–1934	Succeeded by Elwin L. Page
Preceded by Robert J. Peaslee	Chief Justice of the New Hampshire Supreme Court; 1934–1943	Succeeded by Thomas L. Marble
