= Thomas L. Marble =

American judge (1876–1952)

Thomas L. Marble (December 24, 1876 – October 23, 1952) was a justice of the New Hampshire Supreme Court from 1925 to 1946, serving as chief justice from 1943 to 1946.

Marble was born in Auburn, Maine, and attended Edward Little High School. He received an undergraduate degree from Bowdoin College, where he was a member of Delta Kappa Epsilon fraternity and founder and editor of The Quill, and a law degree from Harvard Law School. While in law school, he was the principal of Gorham High School. After law school, he practiced law in Berlin, New Hampshire. In 1917, he was appointed to the New Hampshire Superior Court.

In 1926, Marble was president of the New Hampshire Bar Association.

He died in Concord, New Hampshire.

Political offices
Preceded by John E. Young	Justice of the New Hampshire Supreme Court; 1925–1943	Succeeded by Elwin L. Page
Preceded by John E. Allen	Chief Justice of the New Hampshire Supreme Court; 1943–1946	Succeeded by Oliver Winslow Branch
