= Edmund L. Cushing =

American judge (1807–1883)

Edmund Lambert Cushing (1807 – June 3, 1883) was chief justice of the New Hampshire Supreme Court from 1874 to 1876.

He was born in Lunenburg, Massachusetts and in 1827, he graduated from Harvard College. In 1834, he was admitted to the bar and in 1840, moved to Charlestown, New Hampshire. In the early 1850s, he was elected to the New Hampshire House of Representatives, where he served two terms. In 1874, he was appointed Chief Justice of the New Hampshire Supreme Court.

In 1874, Cushing was president of the New Hampshire Bar Association.

Political offices
Preceded by J. Everett Sargent	Chief Justice of the New Hampshire Supreme Court; 1874–1876	Succeeded by Charles Cogswell Doe
