= Meshech Weare =

American judge (1713–1786)

The Honorable Meshech Weare

1st President of New Hampshire
- In office June 15, 1784 – June 1, 1785
- Succeeded by: John Langdon

1st Chief Justice of the New Hampshire Superior Court of Judicature
- In office 1776–1782
- Succeeded by: Samuel Livermore

Personal details
- Born: June 16, 1713 Third Parish, Province of New Hampshire, British America (now Hampton Falls, New Hampshire, U.S.)
- Died: January 14, 1786 (aged 72) Hampton Falls, New Hampshire, U.S.

Meshech Weare (June 16, 1713 – January 14, 1786) was an American farmer, lawyer, and statesman from Seabrook and Hampton Falls, New Hampshire. He served as the first president of New Hampshire. Before 1784 the position of governor was referred to as “president of New Hampshire.”

He is also called “The father of New Hampshire.” The first president of the earlier Province of New Hampshire was John Cutt.

== Family life ==
Meshech was born to Deacon Nathaniel Weare and his second wife, Mary Waite, in what was then the Third Parish, New Hampshire. The site of the home is now in Seabrook, though the actual house burned down in the early 1900s.

Weare was baptized in modern-day Hampton Falls, New Hampshire, on June 21, 1713. He was the youngest of 14 children. Some of his siblings included (in order of baptism date) Elizabeth, Abigail, Mehitable, Susanna, and Nathan.

Weare graduated from Harvard College in 1735. He originally planned to work in the Congregational ministry, but those plans were changed after his marriage to Elizabeth Shaw in 1738. He planned on improving the land he and his wife bought after their marriage, but this plan was cut short by his wife's death. He remarried to Mehitable Wainwright in 1746. During this time he began to study law, starting with the books passed down to him from his father and grandfather, who were former lay Judges in the provincial court.

The house in which Weare lived was built in 1737 by Samuel Shaw, and is now listed on the National Register of Historic Places. It was later to be visited by George Washington, Marquis de Lafayette, and James Monroe. The back half of the house burnt many years after Weare's death, although the front half was saved. It still stands in Hampton Falls, next to the park named after Weare and across from the town school, Lincoln Akerman School.

== Political life ==
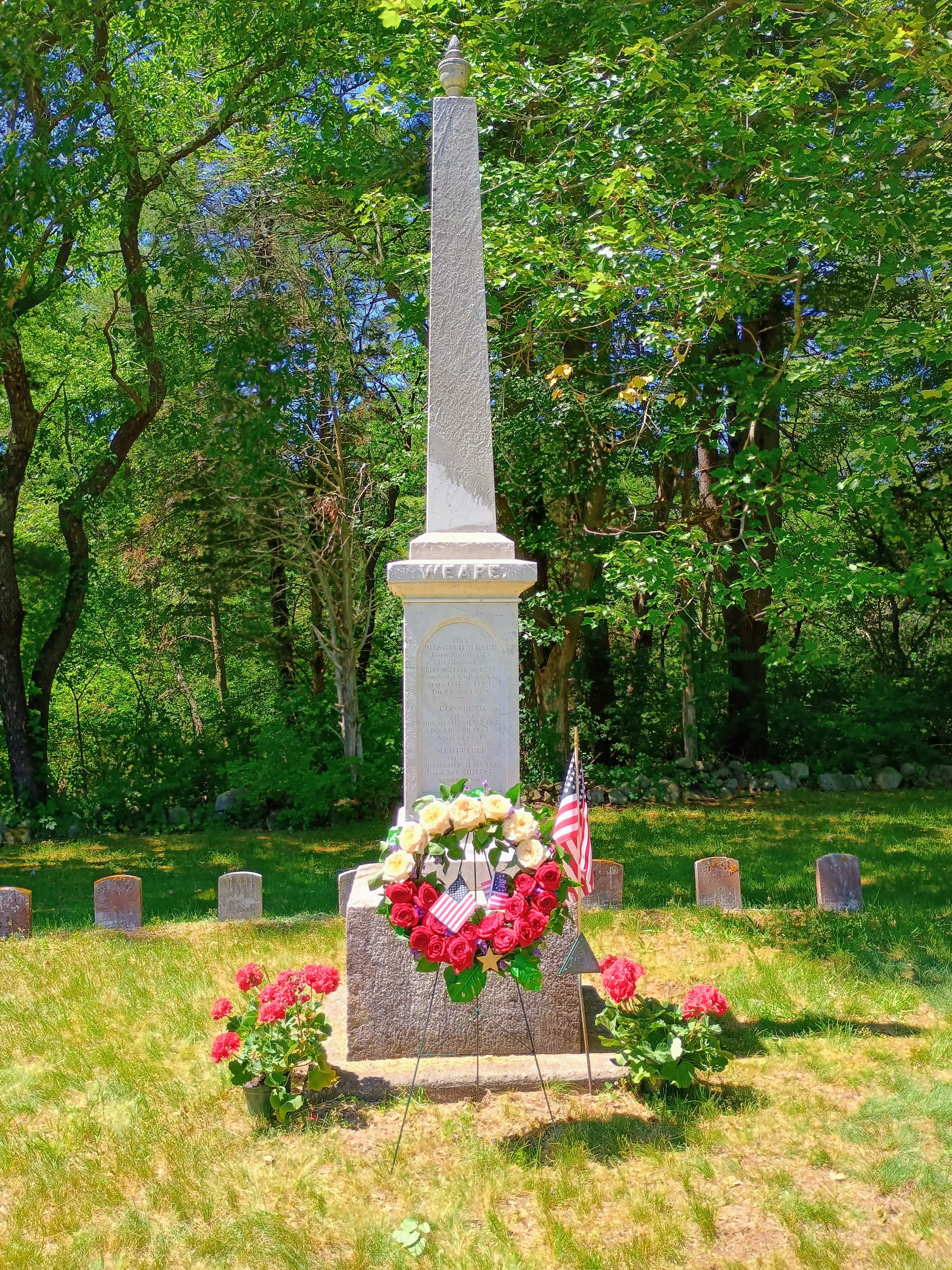

Weare's political career began in 1739 when he became a town moderator. For the next 35 years, he served in various political positions, including selectman and representative of Hampton Falls in the Assembly. He was also the speaker of the House of Representatives three times, and its clerk for eight years. In 1754, he was one of New Hampshire's delegates to the Albany Congress.

In September 1772, Weare served as one of the four judges in the trial of the participants in the Pine Tree Riot, an early act of rebellion against British authority in the Colonies. Although the defendants were found guilty (of assaulting a sheriff who had been enforcing laws against harvesting white pine reserved to the Crown), the light fines assessed by the court were seen as encouraging other such acts, including the Boston Tea Party.

On January 5, 1776, New Hampshire became the first American state to adopt a formal constitution. Weare was a leader in the drafting of this document, which served as the basic instrument of government for the ensuing eight years or until the adoption of a second and more permanent constitution in 1784. Under this constitution, there was no established executive, and the legislature was supreme. In practice, executive power was delegated to a Committee of Safety consisting of eight or ten legislative leaders. This committee had full power to act on behalf of the government while the legislature was not in session. After a brief interval, Weare was elected chairman of the Committee of Safety and served in this capacity throughout the Revolution.

In addition to being New Hampshire's first "Governor”, Weare was chief justice of the state's highest court the "Superior Court of Judicature" from 1776 to 1782. He also served as presiding officer of the Council, then part of the upper house of the legislature. He managed to hold that position throughout the American Revolution. He was elected a Foreign Honorary Member of the American Academy of Arts and Sciences in 1782.

The Committee of Safety, over which Weare presided, was a most interesting governmental institution. It operated both at the state and (through a network of town committees of safety) at the local level, and was virtually a law unto itself while the legislature was not in session. Its duties included supervision and coordination of military affairs within the state, raising of recruits and supplies, regulation of the state militia, custody of prisoners of war, supervision of the entrance and clearance of vessels from Portsmouth Harbor, regulation of privateers and captured prizes, surveillance of the Loyalists, regulation of trade and currency (including prevention of counterfeiting), and supervision of price controls.

== Memorials ==
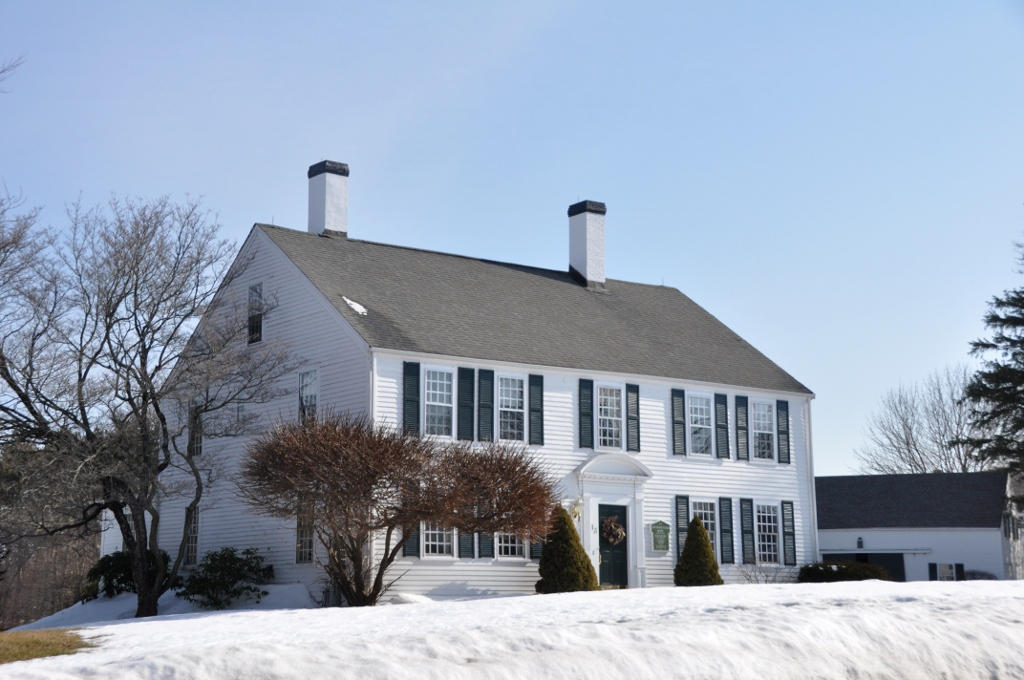
Gov. Meshech Weare House

The New Hampshire town of Weare (formerly Hale's Town or Robie's Town) was renamed in 1764 to honor his service as the town's first clerk.

In Hampton Falls, a park, built in the early 2000s directly next to his house, is named for him. Weare's grave is located in a small cemetery an eighth of a mile down the road.

Political offices
| Preceded by John Wentworth as Governor of the Province of New Hampshire | Governor of New Hampshire; 1784–1785 | Succeeded by John Langdon |
