= Justice Horton =

Justice Horton may refer to:

- Albert H. Horton (1837–1902), chief justice of the Kansas Supreme Court
- Joel D. Horton (born 1959), associate justice of the Idaho Supreme Court
- Sherman D. Horton Jr. (1931–2014), associate justice of the New Hampshire Supreme Court
