= Goodenow =

Goodenow may refer to:

== Places ==
- Goodenow, Illinois
- Goodenow Grove Nature Preserve, nature preserve in Illinois.

== People with the surname ==
- Bob Goodenow (1952–2025), American business manager
- Robert Goodenow,(1800–1874) American politician
- Rufus K. Goodenow, (1790–1863) American politician
- John Elliot Goodenow (1812–1902), American politician
- John M. Goodenow, (1782–1838) American politician
- John H. Goodenow (1833–1906), American politician

== See also ==
- Goodnow (disambiguation)
- Justice Goodenow (disambiguation)
