= Edward John Lampron =

American judge (1909–1983)

Chief Justice of the New Hampshire Supreme Court
- In office 1978–1979

Associate Justice of the New Hampshire Supreme Court
- In office 1949–1978

Personal details
- Born: August 23, 1909 Nashua, New Hampshire
- Died: January 24, 1983 (aged 73)
- Education: Assumption University (BA); Harvard Law School (LLB)
- Occupation: jurist

Edward John Lampron (August 23, 1909 – January 24, 1983) was an associate justice of the New Hampshire Supreme Court from 1949 to 1978, and chief justice from 1978 to 1979.

Born in Nashua, New Hampshire, to John P. and Helene Deschenes Lampron, Lampron received a B.A. from Assumption University in Massachusetts in 1931, followed by a law degree from Harvard Law School in 1934. Governor Meldrim Thomson Jr. appointed Lampron to a seat on the state supreme court vacated by Francis Wayland Johnston.

Lampron married Laurette L. Loiselle, with whom he had two children. He died at St. Joseph Hospital in Nashua, after a lingering illness, at the age of 73.

Political offices
Preceded by Francis Wayland Johnston	Justice of the New Hampshire Supreme Court; 1949–1978	Succeeded by David A. Brock
Preceded by Frank R. Kenison	Chief Justice of the New Hampshire Supreme Court; 1978–1979	Succeeded by William Alvan Grimes
