= Henry Bellows =

Henry Bellows may refer to:

- Henry Adams Bellows (justice) (1803–1873), American lawyer, politician, and Chief Justice of the New Hampshire Supreme Court
- Henry Adams Bellows (businessman) (1885–1939), American executive and translator
- Henry Whitney Bellows (1814–1882), American clergyman
