= Isaac N. Blodgett =

American lawyer and politician (1838–1905)

Mayor of Franklin
- In office 1903–1905
- Preceded by: Harry W. Daniell
- Succeeded by: George E. Shepard

22nd Chief Justice of the New Hampshire Supreme Court
- In office 1898–1902
- Preceded by: Lewis W. Clark
- Succeeded by: Frank Nesmith Parsons

Personal details
- Born: Isaac Newton Blodgett; March 6, 1838 Canaan, New Hampshire, United States
- Died: November 27, 1905 (aged 67) Franklin, New Hampshire, United States
- Party: Democratic Party
- Spouse: Sarah Gerould (m. 1861)
- Children: 1

Isaac Newton Blodgett (March 6, 1838 – November 27, 1905) was an American lawyer and politician who served on the New Hampshire Supreme Court from 1880 to 1902, serving as chief justice from 1898 to 1902.

== Early life and education ==
Blodgett was born on March 6, 1838, at Canaan, New Hampshire, to Caleb Blodgett and Charlotte Piper. His brother, also named Caleb Blodgett, served as the senior justice of the Superior Court of Massachusetts. His ancestors once resided in Cambridge, Massachusetts, before moving to Tyngsborough and Chelmsford and later to Hudson, New Hampshire.

Isaac's father, the older Caleb, moved to Dorchester then to Canaan, where he spent the rest of his life. He held the role of Sheriff of Grafton County and was a member of the state's House of Representatives and Senate.

Isaac was educated in the public schools and entered as a sophomore at the Canaan Union Academy, while also being tutored by his brother at Leominster, Massachusetts. He later studied at Dartmouth College, but abandoned the idea and went to study law. In 1857, he studied law in the office of William P. Weeks and Anson S. Marshall, later being admitted to the bar by 1860. In 1870, He was conferred by the College with an honorary degree in the Master of Arts and was elected an honorary member of Phi Beta Kappa in 1881.

== Career ==
Blodgett opened an office on Canaan Street, succeeding the business of Weeks. He remained in his home town to practice law in his office from 1862 until 1867, where he moved to Franklin and entered into a partnership with Austin F. Pike after being offered a partnership with him. Blodgett worked with Pike under the firm name Pike & Blodgett until 1878, when he was appointed associate justice of the New Hampshire Supreme Court.

Later, Blodgett was a member of the New Hampshire House of Representatives from the city of Franklin, representing the fifth district in the years 1871, 1873-1874, and 1878, and later a member of the State Senate in the years 1879 and 1880. Being a member of the Democratic Party, he conducted campaigns as the Chairman of the New Hampshire Democratic Party State Committee from 1876 to 1877, supporting Samuel J. Tilden's candidacy for President. He was also a member of the Constitutional Conventions of 1876 and 1889.

Following the resignation of George A. Bingham, a vacancy occurred on the bench of the state Supreme Court. After his defeat in the election, Blodgett's friends urged his reappointment to fill his vacant spot. Blodgett was soon appointed to the state Supreme Court as associate justice in November 1880 to fill Bingham's vacancy, a position in which he served until he became chief justice of the court in 1898. At an April 25, 1902, meeting of the governor and council, Blodgett tendered his resignation from the court, to take effect July 1.

He served as town treasurer of Franklin for several years. Following his retirement from the court in 1902, both the Democratic and Republican parties unanimously nominated Blodgett to serve as mayor of Franklin.

== Personal life and death ==
In May 1861, Blodgett married Sarah Gerould of Canaan. They had one child together, Anna Blodgett, a graduate of Wellesley College.

Blodgett died in his residence in Franklin on November 27, 1905. He was survived by his wife and daughter.

Political offices
Preceded by Lewis W. Clark	Chief Justice of the New Hampshire Supreme Court; 1893–1902	Succeeded by Frank Nesmith Parsons
Political offices
Preceded by George A. Bingham	Justice of the New Hampshire Supreme Court; 1880–1893	Succeeded by George H. Bingham
