= Justice Grimes =

Justice Grimes may refer to:

- Elizabeth A. Grimes (born 1954), associate justice of the California Second District Court of Appeal
- Louis Arthur Grimes (1883–1948), chief justice of Liberia
- Stephen H. Grimes (1927–2021), chief justice of the Supreme Court of Florida
- William Alvan Grimes (1911–1999), chief justice of the New Hampshire Supreme Court
