= Oliver Winslow Branch =

American judge (1878–1956)

Oliver Winslow Branch (October 4, 1879 – February 6, 1956) was an associate justice of the New Hampshire Supreme Court from 1926 to 1946, and chief justice from 1946 to 1949.

Branch was the oldest of four children of New York attorney Oliver Ernesto Branch and Sarah M. Chase, of Weare, New Hampshire. He received an undergraduate degree from Harvard College in 1902, and a law degree from Harvard Law School in 1904, and was appointed to the New Hampshire Superior Court in 1913. He was appointed to the state supreme court in 1926. In 1938, Branch was also president of the New Hampshire Bar Association. Branch retired from the supreme court upon reaching the statutory age limit on his 70th birthday, on October 4, 1949.

Branch married Isabel Dow Hogle of Rochester, New York, on November 13, 1910, with whom he had 5 children. Branch died at his home in Manchester, New Hampshire, at the age of 76.

Political offices
| Preceded by William Alberto Plummer | Justice of the New Hampshire Supreme Court; 1926–1946 | Succeeded by Laurence Ilsley Duncan |
| Preceded by Thomas L. Marble | Chief Justice of the New Hampshire Supreme Court; 1946–1949 | Succeeded by Francis Wayland Johnston |
