= Lewis W. Clark =

American judge (1828–1900)

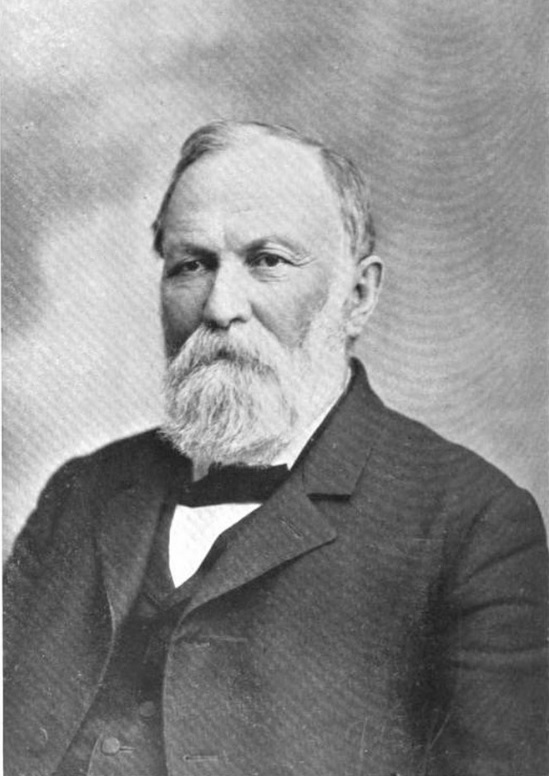

Lewis Whitehouse Clark (August 19, 1828 – May 28, 1900) was a justice of the New Hampshire Supreme Court from 1877 to 1898, serving as chief justice in 1898.

Born at Barnstead, New Hampshire, Clark was the son of Jeremiah and Hannah (Whitehouse) Clark, his father being a prominent farmer of that town, who held several town offices and served as representative to the General Court. Clark attended the common schools of Barnstead and studied at Pittsfield and Atkinson academies. He graduated from Dartmouth College in 1850. He was principal of the Pittsfield academy from August 1850 to December 1852, meanwhile studying law with Moses Norris and A. F. L. Norris, both of Pittsfield, and was admitted to the bar of New Hampshire at Laconia on September 3, 1852. In January 1853 he began practice at Pittsfield as a partner of A. F. L. Norris, but a year later he formed a partnership with a former classmate, Richard Hayes, which lasted about two years. From 1856 to 1860 he practiced alone in Pittsfield. He was a member of the New Hampshire House of Representatives from Pittsfield in 1856 and 1857, and was subsequently the Democratic candidate for Congress. In April 1860 he moved to Manchester, New Hampshire.

He entered into a partnership with George W. Morrison and Clinton W. Stanley, and the firm of Morrison, Stanley & Clark continued about six years and did a very large and successful business. Afterwards Clark was a partner of Henry H. Huse until May 24, 1872, when Governor James A. Weston appointed Clark to be New Hampshire Attorney General. He served in that office until August 1876, when he resumed general practice. On August 13, 1877, Governor Benjamin F. Prescott appointed Clark to a seat on the state Supreme Court, and in May 1898 Governor George A. Ramsdell elevated Clark to the position of chief justice, following the death of Chief Justice Carpenter. Clark's elevation was considered "a due recognition of his ability and of his long and efficient service as a member of the court." Clark held this office until August 19, 1898, when he reached the mandatory retirement age. He then resumed private practice in Manchester, and was referee in bankruptcy under the law of 1898, until his death.

Clark married Helen M. Knowlton of Pittsfield in December 1852. He died at Manchester, New Hampshire, and was survived by his wife, one daughter, Mary Helen Clark, and one son, Reverend John Lew Clark.

Political offices
Preceded by Alonzo P. Carpenter	Chief Justice of the New Hampshire Supreme Court; 1898–1898	Succeeded by Isaac N. Blodgett
Political offices
Preceded by Newly established seat	Justice of the New Hampshire Supreme Court; 1877–1898	Succeeded by Robert J. Peaslee
