= Gov. Meshech Weare House =

Historic house in New Hampshire, United States

Coordinates: 42.91721°N 70.86692°W

- U.S. National Register of Historic Places
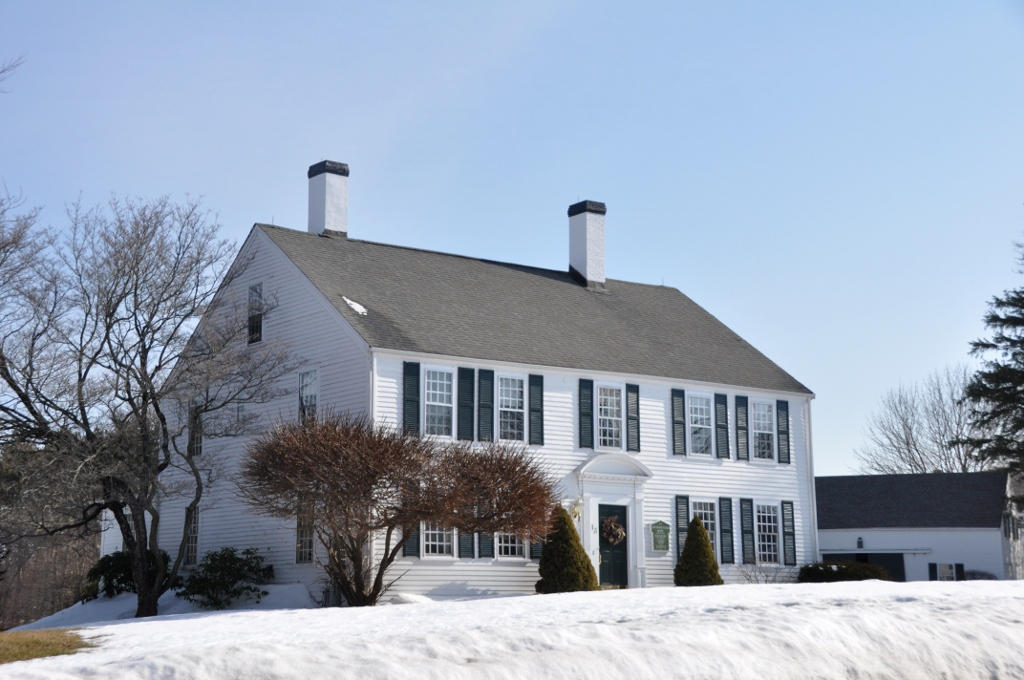

- Location within New Hampshire Location within the United States
- Location: Exeter Rd. (NH 88), Hampton Falls, New Hampshire
- Area: 3 acres (1.2 ha)
- Built: 1776
- NRHP reference No.: 73000174
- Added to NRHP: June 29, 1973

The Gov. Meshech Weare House is a historic house on Exeter Road (New Hampshire Route 88) in Hampton Falls, New Hampshire. It was built in 1723, and is notable as the home of Meshech Weare, the first Governor of New Hampshire after it declared independence from the British crown. It was listed on the National Register of Historic Places in 1973.

== Description and history ==
The Governor Meshech Weare House stands in the town center of Hampton Falls, on the north side of Exeter Road at its junction with Lincoln Avenue. It is just west of the First Baptist Church, and across the street from a public school. To its west is a small park named in Weare's honor. The house is 2 1/2 stories in height, and is of wood-frame construction with a side gable roof, two interior chimneys, and a clapboarded exterior. The main facade is five bays wide, with a center entrance flanked by pilasters and topped by an entablature and full segmented-arch pediment. The interior of the building is a combination of old and modern elements, including some period paneling. The house has ells extending to the rear, which are 20th century work done to replace others destroyed in fires. After a 1957 fire the rear of the main block was extended, increasing the size of the rooms there.

The house was built in 1723, and was for many years home to Meshech Weare. Weare (1713-1786) was educated at Harvard, and was primarily a farmer until the time of the American Revolution. A reluctant supporter of independence, he chaired the state's executive committee during the American Revolutionary War, and became its first President in 1784 (the term Governor of New Hampshire was adopted later). Notable guests at the house include George Washington, James Madison, and the Gilbert du Motier, Marquis de Lafayette.

== See also ==
- National Register of Historic Places listings in Rockingham County, New Hampshire
