= John Dudley (judge) =

American judge

John Dudley (April 9, 1725 – May 21, 1805) was a justice of the New Hampshire Supreme Court from 1784 to 1797.

Born in Exeter, New Hampshire, Dudley did not have, in his youth, even a common school education, and was barely able to read. He became a grocer in Exeter, and was successful. For five years, from 1760 to 1765, he was a selectman of the town. In 1768 he was appointed a justice of the peace by the royal governor. Dudley became an ardent and active Whig, and after the news of the Battles of Lexington and Concord in 1775, he devoted himself to the American Revolution and the establishment of the United States. He was chosen to the provincial congresses in 1775 and was immediately recognized as a leader. From 1775 to 1784 he was constantly in the legislature, and in 1782 and 1783 he was Speaker of the New Hampshire House of Representatives. From 1776 to 1784 he was on the committee of safety.

In 1776 he was made a justice of the court of common pleas, serving until 1784, when he was promoted to the bench of the Superior Court. He served as an associate justice of that court until his resignation in 1797. Though unlearned in the law, his judicial duties were performed to the satisfaction of the legal community. Massachusetts Chief Justice Theophilus Parsons said, "Though we may smile at his law, and ridicule his language, yet take him all in all, Dudley was the greatest and best judge I ever knew in New Hampshire", and Judge Arthur Livermore said, "that justice was never better administered in this state than when Dudley was on the bench".

Dudley died in Raymond, New Hampshire, at the age of 80.

Political offices
Preceded by Woodbury Langdon	Justice of the New Hampshire Supreme Court; 1784–1797	Succeeded by Edward St. Loe Livermore
