= Haven Doe =

American politician (1870–1946)

Member of the New Hampshire Senate from the 20th District
- In office 1933–1938
- Preceded by: John M. Hubbard
- Succeeded by: Edmond J. Marcoux

Personal details
- Born: April 23, 1870 Rollinsford, New Hampshire, U.S.
- Died: October 4, 1946 (aged 76) Somersworth, New Hampshire, U.S.
- Party: Democratic
- Spouse: Mora Belle Hubbard (m. 1894)
- Relations: Jessie Doe (sister)
- Children: 3
- Parent(s): Charles and Edith (Haven) Doe

Haven Doe (April 23, 1870 – October 4, 1946) was an American politician who served in the New Hampshire General Court.

== Early life ==
Doe was born on April 23, 1870, in Rollinsford, New Hampshire, to New Hampshire Supreme Court justice Charles Cogswell Doe and his wife Edith Haven Doe. He attended the Berwick Academy and graduated from Phillips Exeter Academy and the Massachusetts Institute of Technology. He spent many years as the station agent for the Boston and Maine Railroad in Somersworth, New Hampshire, and was a director of the Salmon Falls Manufacturing Company for thirteen years.

== Politics ==
From 1893 to 1894, Doe was a member of the New Hampshire House of Representatives. He also held numerous local offices in Rollinsford and Somersworth. He was Somersworth's mayor in 1901 and served as treasurer for 21 years.

Doe was a member of the New Hampshire Senate from 1911 to 1912 and again from 1933 to 1938. He was the Democratic nominee for President of the New Hampshire Senate in 1933 and 1935.

In 1933, Doe was appointed to the newly-formed New Hampshire Racing Commission by Republican governor John Gilbert Winant due to Executive Councilor Alphonse Roy's objection to an all-Republican commission and as a reward for Doe's support on the governor's 48 hour bill. He was reappointed in 1934, but not in 1935 due to political pressure to appoint someone from Hillsborough County. He returned to the commission that October after his successor, Arthur Johnson, resigned following an alleged plot to kidnap him. He was replaced the following year by Irving Hinkley, who had the support of the majority of Democratic Executive Councilors.
