= Sherman D. Horton Jr. =

American judge (1931–2014)

Sherman Duesenbury Horton Jr. (February 19, 1931 – December 3, 2014) was a justice of the New Hampshire Supreme Court from 1990 to 2000.

He was born in Kansas City, Missouri, and attended Kemper Military School. He was a graduate of Dartmouth College and in 1958 graduated from Harvard Law School. Between his time at Dartmouth and Harvard, he served in the United States Navy. He was a lawyer in Nashua before he was nominated to the state Supreme Court by governor Judd Gregg. He replaced David Souter, who became a justice on the United States Supreme Court.

Horton was the first person who was not previously a judge to be nominated to the court in five decades, the previous being chief justice Frank R. Kenison.

He died at the Concord VNA Hospice House in 2014, at the age of 83.

Political offices
Preceded by David Souter	Justice of the New Hampshire Supreme Court; 1990–2000	Succeeded by James E. Duggan
