= Andrew Salter Woods =

American judge (1803–1863)

Andrew Salter Woods (June 2, 1803 – June 20, 1863) was a justice of the New Hampshire Supreme Court from 1840 to 1855, serving as chief justice in 1855.

== Early life, education, and career ==
Born in Bath, New Hampshire, to Andrew and Isabella (Jameson) Woods, he was of Scotch-Irish descent.

He graduated at Dartmouth College, in 1835, and then read law in the office of Ira Goodall of Bath. Woods gained admission to the bar and then partnered with his mentor, practicing in the firm of Goodell & Woods in Bath for the next twelve years.

== Judicial service ==
In 1840, Woods was made an associate justice of the state supreme court. Dartmouth gave him the honorary degree of LL. D., in 1852.

On the resignation of Judge John Gilchrist in 1855 to join the United States Court of Claims, Woods was promoted to the position of chief justice.

He was legislated out of office by the political change in the state, though this was "not at all aimed at him", and he resumed the practice of the law at Bath.

== Personal life and death ==
Judge Woods was married, January 7, 1830, to Eliza, daughter of Hon. James Hutchins of Bath. They had three daughters and two sons, one of whom, Edward Woods, studied the profession of his father.

Woods died in Bath at the age of 60.

Political offices
| Preceded by Leonard Wilcox | Justice of the New Hampshire Supreme Court; 1840–1855 | Succeeded by Ira Perley |
| Preceded by John Gilchrist | Chief Justice of the New Hampshire Supreme Court; 1855–1855 | Succeeded by Ira Perley |
