= Laurence Ilsley Duncan =

American judge (1906–1982)

Laurence Ilsley Duncan (October 5, 1906 – December 18, 1982) was a justice of the New Hampshire Supreme Court from 1946 to 1976.

He was born and raised in Concord, New Hampshire, and received an undergraduate degree from Dartmouth College in 1927, followed by a law degree from Harvard Law School to 1930. He practiced law in New Hampshire following graduation from Harvard until 1945, when he became a justice of the New Hampshire Superior Court.

Duncan died at Concord Hospital following a brief illness. He was survived by his wife Doris and two sons.

Political offices
Preceded by Oliver Winslow Branch	Justice of the New Hampshire Supreme Court; 1946–1976	Succeeded by Maurice Paul Bois
