= Stephen Morse Wheeler =

American judge (1900–1967)

Stephen Morse Wheeler (August 30, 1900 – March 7, 1967) was a justice of the New Hampshire Supreme Court from 1957 to 1967.

Born in Atkinson, New Hampshire, Wheeler served in the United States Army in World War I, and was elected to the New Hampshire House of Representatives from his home town in 1923, making him the youngest person at the time to be elected to the New Hampshire state legislature. He received his law degree from the Northeastern University School of Law in 1927, gaining admission to the bar in New Hampshire in 1928. Wheeler served as county solicitor of Rockingham County, New Hampshire, from 1937 to 1942, when he was nominated for the position Attorney General of New Hampshire by Governor Robert O. Blood, to succeed Frank R. Kenison, who had taken leave from the office to serve in World War II. Kenison endorsed his assistant, Ernest D. D'Amours, to succeed him as attorney general, but Governor Blood preferred Wheeler, and the state council approved Wheeler as the governor's nominee, by a 3-2 vote. Wheeler served from 1942 to 1944. He then served on the New Hampshire Superior Court until March 15, 1957, when Governor Lane Dwinell appointed Wheeler to the state supreme court.

Wheeler was married to Marion Taylor, with whom he had two sons. Wheeler died from a heart attack while shoveling snow outside his home in Exeter, New Hampshire, at the age of 66.

Political offices
Preceded by John Richard Goodnow	Justice of the New Hampshire Supreme Court; 1957–1967	Succeeded by Robert Frederick Griffith
