= Jessie Doe =

Jessie Doe (February 21, 1887 – September 24, 1943) was an American civic leader who was one of the first women to serve in the New Hampshire House of Representatives.

== Early life ==
Doe was born on February 21, 1887, at her family home in Rollinsford, New Hampshire. She was the youngest child of New Hampshire Supreme Court justice Charles Cogswell Doe and his wife Edith Haven Doe. She was educated at the Berwick Academy in South Berwick, Maine, and the Gilman School in Cambridge, Massachusetts. After leaving school in 1907, she returned to Rollinsford to take care of her mother and the family's 75-acre farm. She was an officer in many social clubs, including the Red Cross Public Nursing Association of Rollinsford and South Berwick, the Berwick Woman's Club, and the Woman's Committee of National Defense. She was a horseback rider and mountain climber who held memberships in the Appalachian Mountain Club and the Green Mountain Horse Association.

== New Hampshire House of Representatives ==
Months after the ratification of the Nineteenth Amendment to the United States Constitution granted women suffrage, Doe ran as a write-in candidate for Rollinsford's seat in the New Hampshire House of Representatives. Although typically a Democratic town, Rollinsford elected Doe, a Republican. She served on the Public Health and Forestry committees, supported legislation to censor motion pictures, implement a statewide income tax, create a state teacher's college in Manchester, and appoint woman factory inspectors, and opposed a bill that would relieve women from jury duty. She did not run for reelection in 1922.

In 1926, Doe was appointed to the board of trustees for the State Industrial School. She resigned in 1930 at the request of Governor Charles W. Tobey, who demanded the resignations of all board members after allegations of excessive punishment, including the use of flogging and water cures, were made against the school.

In 1930, Doe sought to return to the House of Representatives. The race ended in a tie between her and Democratic incumbent Gardner Grant. The majority-Republican House chose to seat Doe. In the 1932 election, Doe was the Republican nominee in New Hampshire's 21st State Senate district while her brother, Haven Doe, was the Democratic nominee in the 20th.

== University of New Hampshire ==
On June 30, 1932, Doe was appointed to the University of New Hampshire board of trustees by Governor John Gilbert Winant. She remained on the board until June 30, 1942. She died suddenly on September 24, 1943, at the Margaret Pillsbury General Hospital in Concord, New Hampshire. At her request, no funeral was held and her body was donated to science. In 1964, the University of New Hampshire named a dormitory after her.
