= James M. Rix =

American politician

James Madison Rix
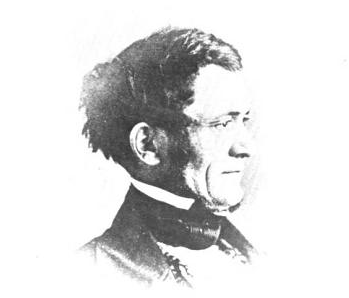

President of the New Hampshire Senate
- In office 1853–1853
- Preceded by: John S. Wells
- Succeeded by: J. Everett Sargent

Member of the New Hampshire Senate
- In office 1852–1853

Member of the New Hampshire House of Representatives
- In office 1847–1848

Personal details
- Born: December 23, 1811 Landaff, New Hampshire
- Died: March 25, 1856 (aged 44) Boston, Massachusetts
- Party: Democratic
- Spouse: Mary Palmer
- Children: Eliza Rix

James Madison Rix (December 23, 1811 – March 25, 1856) was an American newspaper printer editor, politician and lawyer who served as the President of the New Hampshire Senate.

Rix was born to Caleb and Eliza Morrell Rix on December 23, 1811.

Rix married Mary Palmer of Concord, New Hampshire, they had a daughter Eliza Rix

Rix learned the trade of printing by working in the office of The Democratic Republican newspaper in Haverhill, New Hampshire.

In July 1838 Rix co-founded The Coös County Democrat with James M. Whittemore.

Rix died March 25, 1856, in the City Hotel in Boston, Massachusetts.

== Notes ==
Political offices
Preceded by John S. Wells	President of the New Hampshire Senate; 1853-1853	Succeeded by J. Everett Sargent
