= Timothy Farrar =

American judge (1747–1849)

Timothy Farrar (June 28, 1747 – February 20, 1849) was a justice of the New Hampshire Supreme Court from 1791 to 1803.

Judge Farrar was born in Concord, Massachusetts, in what is now a part of Lincoln, Massachusetts. He graduated from Harvard College in 1767. In 1774 he was chosen first selectman and town clerk of New Ipswich, New Hampshire.

In 1775, he was made a judge of common pleas. From 1778 to 1782, he was part of the committee to write the Constitution of New Hampshire. After his time with the state Supreme Court, he was again a judge of the Court of Common Pleas until 1813.

He died at his daughter's house in Hollis, New Hampshire.

Political offices
Preceded by Woodbury Langdon	Justice of the New Hampshire Supreme Court; 1791–1803	Succeeded by William King Atkinson
