= Ira Perley =

American judge (1799–1874)

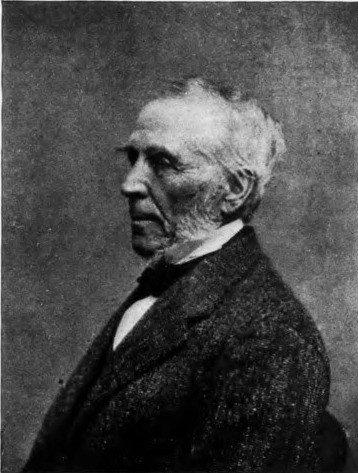

Chief Justice of the Superior Court of Judicature
- In office August 1, 1864 – September 1869
- Preceded by: Samuel Dana Bell
- Succeeded by: Henry Adams Bellows

Chief Justice of the Superior Court of Judicature
- In office July 20, 1855 – October 1, 1859
- Appointed by: Ralph Metcalf
- Preceded by: Andrew Salter Woods
- Succeeded by: Samuel Dana Bell

Associate Justice of the Superior Court of Judicature
- In office October 1852 – July 1855
- Appointed by: Samuel Dinsmoor Jr.

Member of the New Hampshire House of Representatives From Hanover, New Hampshire

Member of the New Hampshire House of Representatives From Concord, New Hampshire

Personal details
- Born: November 9, 1799
- Died: February 26, 1874 (aged 74) Concord, New Hampshire
- Spouse: Mary S. Nelson
- Profession: Lawyer

Ira Perley (November 9, 1799 – February 26, 1874) was the chief justice of the New Hampshire Superior Court of Judicature 1855–1859 and 1864–1869.

== Early life ==
Perley was born November 9, 1799, to Samuel and Phebe (Dresser) Perley.

== Career ==
Perley represented both Hanover and Concord in the New Hampshire House of Representatives.

Perley was appointed by Governor Samuel Dinsmoor Jr. as an associate justice of the Superior Court of Judicature in October 1852 and as the chief justice of the Superior Court of Judicature on July 20, 1855 by Governor Ralph Metcalf. Perley resigned from the court on October 1, 1859, he was reappointed as Chief Justice on August 1, 1864, and he resigned again in September 1869.

Perley was elected a member of the American Antiquarian Society in 1866. In 1873, Perley was president of the New Hampshire Bar Association.

Perley died on February 26, 1874, in Concord, New Hampshire.

Legal offices
Preceded by Andrew Salter Woods	Chief Justice of the New Hampshire; Superior Court of Judicature; July 20, 1855-October 1, 1859	Succeeded by Samuel Dana Bell
Preceded by Samuel Dana Bell	Chief Justice of the New Hampshire; Superior Court of Judicature; August 1, 1864-September 1869	Succeeded by Henry Adams Bellows
