= Francis Wayland Johnston =

American judge (1882–1960)

Francis Wayland Johnston (April 29, 1882 – May 15, 1960) was a justice of the New Hampshire Supreme Court from 1943 to 1952, serving as chief justice from October 5, 1949 to 1952.

Born in Nashua, New Hampshire, he attended Roxbury Latin School. He later went to Harvard University for his undergraduate and law degrees, graduating with an AB in 1900 and a law degree in 1904.

In 1932, he became Attorney General of New Hampshire, serving until 1935. After that, he became a judge for the New Hampshire Superior Court. He then became an associate justice of the New Hampshire Supreme Court in 1943, and chief justice in 1949. In 1952 After retiring in 1952, he went back to private practice in Concord, New Hampshire.

He died in 1960 at Concord Hospital.

Political offices
| Preceded by Peter Woodbury | Justice of the New Hampshire Supreme Court; 1943–1949 | Succeeded by Edward John Lampron |
| Preceded by Oliver Winslow Branch | Chief Justice of the New Hampshire Supreme Court; 1949–1952 | Succeeded by Frank R. Kenison |
