= Amos Noyes Blandin Jr. =

American judge (1896–1982)

Amos Noyes Blandin Jr. (December 20, 1896 – May 3, 1982) was a justice of the New Hampshire Supreme Court from 1947 to 1966.

== Early life, education, and military service ==
Born in Bath, New Hampshire, Blandin graduated from Phillips Exeter Academy in 1914, and received his undergraduate degree from Dartmouth College in 1918. Blandin "left Dartmouth in his senior year to join the field artillery in World War I as a second lieutenant". Returning to the U.S., Blandin received his LL.B. from Harvard Law School in 1921.

== Legal career ==
Following his law school graduation, Blandin entered the private practice of law, until 1941.

Blandin served on the New Hampshire Superior Court from 1941 to 1947, and was chief judge of that court for his final two years there. He was appointed to the state supreme court in 1947, and retired from the court on his 70th birthday, as was required by the state's age limit for the position.

Following his retirement, he served as a judicial referee in the state courts, where his duties included an examination of the conduct of a state district court judge, finding misconduct on the part of that judge. Blandin continued as a referee until 1978.

== Personal life and death ==
Blandin married Alberta Bell Miner, with whom he had three daughters. He died at his home in Hanover, New Hampshire, at the age of 85.

Political offices
| Preceded by Henri Alphonse Burque | Justice of the New Hampshire Supreme Court; 1947–1966 | Succeeded by William Alvan Grimes |
