= Justice Goodenow =

Justice Goodenow may refer to:

- Daniel Goodenow (1793–1863), associate justice of the Maine Supreme Judicial Court
- John M. Goodenow (1782–1838), associate justice of the Supreme Court of Ohio
- John Richard Goodnow (1906–1972), associate justice of the New Hampshire Supreme Court
