= Simeon Olcott =

American judge

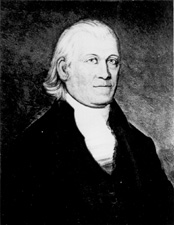

United States Senator from New Hampshire
- In office June 17, 1801 – March 3, 1805
- Preceded by: Samuel Livermore
- Succeeded by: Nicholas Gilman

Chief Judge of the New Hampshire Supreme Court
- In office 1795–1801
- Preceded by: John Pickering
- Succeeded by: Jeremiah Smith

Judge of the New Hampshire Supreme Court
- In office 1790–1795
- Preceded by: Josiah Bartlett
- Succeeded by: Ebenezer Thompson

Associate Justice of the Vermont Supreme Court
- In office 1781–1782
- Preceded by: Increase Moseley
- Succeeded by: Peter Olcott

Personal details
- Born: October 1, 1735 Bolton, Connecticut Colony
- Died: February 22, 1815 (aged 79) Charlestown, New Hampshire
- Resting place: Forest Hill Cemetery, Charlestown, New Hampshire
- Party: Federalist
- Spouse: Tryphena Terry (m. 1783–1815, his death)
- Children: 3
- Education: Yale College
- Profession: Attorney

Simeon Olcott (October 1, 1735 – February 22, 1815) was a New Hampshire attorney and politician. His career began before the American Revolution and continued afterwards, and among the positions in which he served were Chief Judge of the New Hampshire Supreme Court (1795–1801) and United States Senator from New Hampshire (1801–1805).

A native of Bolton, Connecticut, Olcott graduated from Yale College in 1761, studied law, attained admission to the bar, and began to practice in Charlestown, New Hampshire. He quickly became active in politics and government, and served as a town selectman, town meeting moderator, and member of the colonial legislature. He served as Cheshire County Probate Judge during the American Revolution, and when several western New Hampshire towns attempted to join Vermont after the war, Olcott served as an associate justice of the Vermont Supreme Court. The attempted union was soon dissolved, and Olcott served on New Hampshire's Court of Common Pleas (1784–1790), as a judge of the Superior Court (later renamed the state Supreme Court) (1790–1795), and chief judge of the Superior Court (1795–1801). In 1801, Olcott was selected to fill the U.S. Senate vacancy created after Samuel Livermore resigned, and he served from 1801 to 1805.

Olcott died in Charlestown in 1815 and was buried at Forest Hill Cemetery in Charlestown.

== Early life ==
Olcott was born in Bolton, Connecticut Colony, and was a son of Timothy Olcott and also Eunice (White) Olcott. He graduated from Yale College in 1761, studied law, was admitted to the bar and commenced practice in Charlestown, New Hampshire.

== Start of career ==
Olcott served in several local offices, including selectman (1769–1770, 1771) and member of the provincial legislature (1771–1774). In 1770 and 1772, Olcott was elected as Charlestown's town meeting moderator. In 1773, Olcott was appointed judge of probate for Cheshire County, and he served throughout the American Revolution. In 1781, several western New Hampshire towns voted to leave New Hampshire and join Vermont. Several residents of these towns were appointed or elected to Vermont offices, including Olcott, who was chosen as an Associate Justice of the Vermont Supreme Court. The union between New Hampshire's Connecticut River towns and Vermont was soon nullified, and Olcott resigned as an associate justice in 1782.

== Later career ==
In 1784, Olcott was appointed chief justice of the New Hampshire Court of Common Pleas, and he was an unsuccessful U.S. House candidate in a 1789 special election. He held his position as chief justice of the Court of Common Pleas until 1790, when he was appointed a judge of the New Hampshire Superior Court (later renamed the New Hampshire Supreme Court. He served until 1795, when he was appointed chief judge, and he held this position until 1801. When the country's first political parties were created, Olcott became identified with the Federalists.

Samuel Livermore resigned his seat in the United States Senate in 1801. The New Hampshire General Court chose Olcott to fill the vacancy, and he served from June 17, 1801, to March 3, 1805.

== Death and burial ==
Olcott retired at the completion of his U.S. Senate term and continued to reside in Charlestown. He died in Charlestown on February 22, 1815. He was buried at Forest Hill Cemetery in Charlestown.

== Family ==
In 1783, Olcott married Tryphena Terry of Enfield, Connecticut. They were the parents of three children, a son George who died in infancy, a second son named George (1785–1764), who was the longtime cashier of the Connecticut River Bank, and Henry, a career officer in the United States Marine Corps who died in 1821.

== Sources ==
=== Books ===
- Goodwin, Nathaniel (1845). Descendants of Thomas Olcott: One of the First Settlers of Hartford, Connecticut. Hartford, CT: Case, Tiffany and Burnham. p. 26.
- Klyza, Christopher McGrory; Trombulak, Stephen C. (2015). The Story of Vermont: A Natural and Cultural History, Second Edition. Hanover, NH: University Press of New England. ISBN 978-1-61168-402-5.
- MacPhee, Donald Albert (1959). The Tertium Quid Movement: A Study in Political Insurgency. Berkeley, CA: University of California, Berkeley.
- Saunderson, Henry H. (1876). History of Charlestown, New Hampshire. Claremont, NH: Claremont Manufacturing Company.
- Spencer, Thomas E. (1998). Where They're Buried. Baltimore, MD: Clearfield Company. p. 134. ISBN 978-0-8063-4823-0.

=== Internet ===
- Vermont Archives and Records Administration (2017). "Justices of the Supreme Court, 1778 – Present" (PDF). sec.state.vt.us. Montpelier, VT: Vermont Secretary of State.

U.S. Senate
Preceded by Samuel Livermore	U.S. senator (Class 2) from New Hampshire; 1801–1805; Served alongside: James Sheafe, William Plumer	Succeeded by Nicholas Gilman
