= Lilian Carpenter Streeter =

American social reformer, organizational founder, clubwoman and author

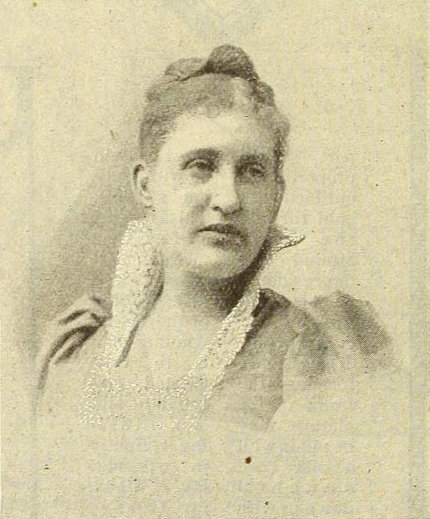
- Born: Lilian Carpenter; July 22, 1854; Bath, New Hampshire, U.S.
- Died: March 29, 1935 (aged 80); Concord, New Hampshire, U.S.
- Education: St. Johnsbury Academy
- Occupations: social reformer; organizational founder; clubwoman; author
- Spouse: Frank Sherwin Streeter (m. 1877; died 1922)
- Children: Julia Streeter; Thomas Winthrop Streeter Sr.
- Parents: Alonzo Philetus; Julia Rosanna (Goodall) Carpenter
- Relatives: William Carpenter
- Writing career
- Language: English

Lilian Carpenter Streeter (July 22, 1854 – March 29, 1935) was an American social reformer, organizational founder, clubwoman, and author. She founded the Concord Woman's Club, and the New Hampshire Federation of Woman's Clubs. Having lived in Concord, New Hampshire from 1877 till her death, she was active in every social, educational, and philanthropic movement that was brought to her notice, and her actions commanded the support and cooperation of other women. At the National Conference of Charities and Correction, held in Baltimore, Maryland, 1915, Streeter gave a paper entitled, "The Relation of Mental Defect to the Neglected, Dependent, and Delinquent Children of New Hampshire", making her the first woman to give a paper of this kind at a national conference. Streeter's articles on social and charitable topics appeared in magazines of the day.

== Early life and education ==
Lilian (sometimes spelled, "Lillian") Carpenter was born in Bath, New Hampshire, July 22, 1854. She was the daughter of Chief Justice Alonzo Philetus and Julia Rosanna (Goodall) Carpenter. She was the granddaughter of Rev. David Goodall, first minister of Littleton, New Hampshire. She was a descendant of William Carpenter, founder of Rehoboth, Massachusetts, and Col. Samuel Partridge, Chief Justice. Streeter had five siblings: Philip, Francis, Arthur, Edith, and Helen.

Streeter was educated in public schools and at the St. Johnsbury Academy. She had private teachers for the study of music and languages.

== Career ==
Streeter was the founder of the New Hampshire Federation of Women's Clubs, and later, its honorary president. Established in Concord, New Hampshire, October 1895, the avowed object was to unite the women of New Hampshire in non-partisan work for the benefit of the state.

Streeter had been the Correspondence Chair for the General Federation of Women's Clubs when she founded and became the first president of the Concord Woman's Club. At the time, there were very few clubs in the State, and her work in that direction was looked upon as something of a new departure.

One of the first things Streeter succeeded in accomplishing, after the founding of the Woman's Club, was the organizing of the Charities of Concord. Having failed in her first agitation, while chairman of the Philanthropic Committee of the Woman's Club, she gave an address upon charities organization before the Woman's Alliance of the Unitarian Church, at which all ministers and officers of charitable societies, in town, were present. At the close of the address a committee of five, with Streeter as chairman, was appointed to see about forming a Charities Organization Society in Concord. The society was organized March 23, 1903. She served as vice-president of the Concord Charity Organization from 1903 till 1910. She served as secretary of the New Hampshire State Board of Charities and Correction, from 1899 to 1901, and chair 1901–11. She was the chair of the Committee on Dependent Children, State Conference of Charities and Correction, from 1901. She served as chair, New Hampshire Children's Commission, 1913–15, her report having been called for from all over the country by social workers and state and college libraries. At the National Conference of Charities and Corrections, held in Baltimore, May 12, 1915, Streeter gave a paper entitled, "The Relation of Mental Defect to the Neglected, Dependent, and Delinquent Children of New Hampshire". She was the first woman to give a paper of this kind at a national conference.

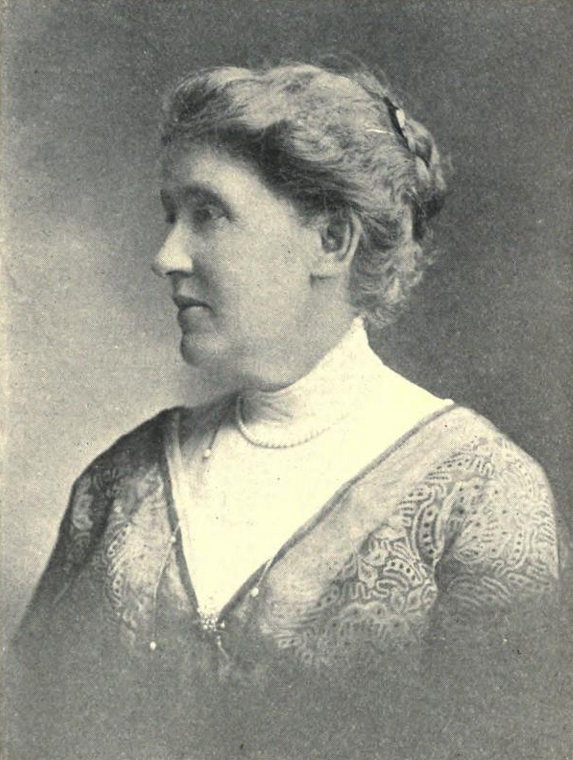
Lilian Carpenter Streeter

Streeter served as a trustee of the Margaret Pillsbury General Hospital (now Concord Hospital). She was the secretary of the Concord District Nursing Association, from its organization in 1899 till 1909, and president from 1909 to 1913, thereafter becoming honorary president. Streeter was a member of the American Academy of Political and Social Science, National Conference of Charities and Corrections, National Organization for Public Health Nursing; American Association for Study and Prevention of Infant Mortality; and the National Conference on the Education of Backward, Truant, Delinquent and Dependent children. She was a representative from New Hampshire at the White House Conference on Children and Youth, January 1909, on call of President Theodore Roosevelt. She was a member of the visiting committee, Orphans' Home, St. Paul's School, Concord; member, Rumford Chapter, Daughters of the American Revolution; treasurer, National Society of the Colonial Dames of America, for New Hampshire; member, executive committee, New Hampshire Branch National Civic Federation. She was a member of several other clubs including Woman's, Shakespeare, Friendly, Golf and Country clubs, Concord, and Mayflower Club, Boston, Massachusetts.

In 1895, she was appointed by Governor Charles A. Busiel to be a member of the New Hampshire Commission to the Atlanta exposition.

Streeter wrote magazine articles on social and charitable topics. She facilitated important reforms associated with the state's almshouses. She was an anti-suffragist.

== Personal life and death ==
On November 14, 1877, in Bath, she married Gen. Frank Sherwin Streeter (1853-1922), lawyer, of Concord. They had two children: Julia (b. 1878) and Thomas (b. 1883).

In religion, Streeter affiliated with the Episcopal Church, and was a member of St. Paul's Episcopal Church, Concord. She was a member of the Social Service Commission of the Protestant Episcopal diocese of New Hampshire and a member of the Social Service Commission of the Provincial Synod of New England (the only woman on the board).

After a long illness, she died at her home in Concord, March 29, 1935.
