= Oliver Ernesto Branch =

American lawyer and politician

Hon. Oliver Ernesto Branch
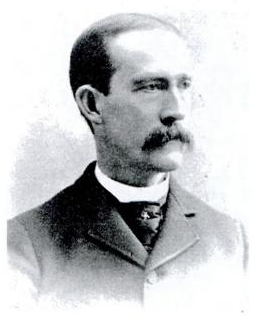

26th United States Attorney for the District of New Hampshire
- Appointed by: Grover Cleveland

Member of the New Hampshire House of Representatives
- In office 1888–1892

Moderator of the Weare, New Hampshire Town Meeting

Personal details
- Born: July 19, 1847 Madison, Ohio
- Died: June 22, 1916 Manchester, New Hampshire
- Children: Fredrick W. Branch; Oliver W. Branch
- Education: Hamilton College, June 25, 1873; Columbia College Law School, May 1877

Oliver Ernesto Branch (July 19, 1847 – June 22, 1916) was an American lawyer and politician from Weare, New Hampshire, who served in the New Hampshire House of Representatives and as the United States Attorney for the District of New Hampshire.

== Early life ==
Branch was born in Madison, Ohio, on July 19, 1847, to William Witter and Lucy J. (Bartram) Branch.

== Education ==
On June 25, 1873, Branch graduated from Hamilton College in upstate New York. While at Hamilton, Branch was a member of the Phi Beta Kappa honor society and the Delta Upsilon fraternity.

In May 1877, from Columbia College Law School.

== Family life ==
Branch married Sarah M. Chase, of Weare, on October 17, 1878. They had four children: Oliver Winslow Branch, Dorothy Witter Branch, Fredrick William Branch, and Randolph Wellington Branch.

== Bar admissions ==
Branch was admitted to the New York Bar in June 1877, and practiced law in New York City. Branch was admitted to the New Hampshire bar in June 1884.

== Public service ==
=== New Hampshire House of Representatives ===
Branch served in the New Hampshire House of Representatives from 1888 to 1892.

=== United States Attorney ===
On March 15, 1894, Branch was appointed by President Grover Cleveland to be the United States Attorney for the District of New Hampshire.

== Death ==
Branch died in Manchester, New Hampshire, on June 33, 1916.

Legal offices
Preceded by James W. Remick	26th United States Attorney for the District of New Hampshire; 1894-1898	Succeeded by Charles J. Hamblett
Political offices
Preceded by	Member of the New Hampshire House of Representatives; 1888-1892	Succeeded by
