= Thomas Winthrop Streeter Sr. =

American collector (1883–1965)

Thomas W. Streeter Sr.
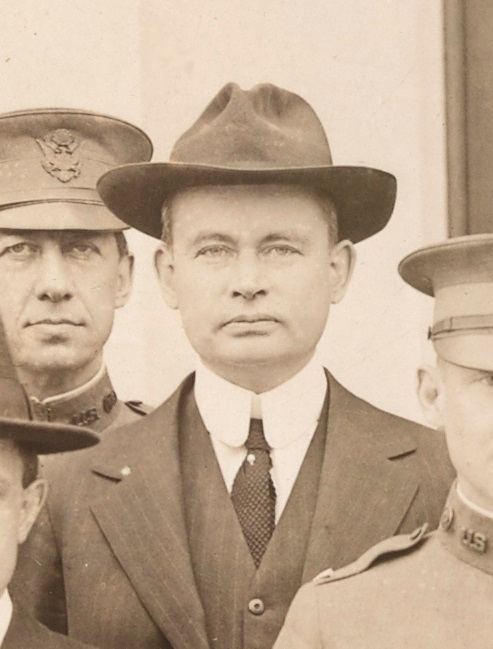
- Thomas Streeter in 1919
- Born: Thomas Winthrop Streeter; July 20, 1883; Concord, New Hampshire
- Died: June 12, 1965 (aged 81); Morristown, New Jersey
- Education: Dartmouth College; Harvard Law School
- Occupations: Businessman; collector; lawyer
- Spouse: Ruth Cheney (m. 1917)
- Children: 3
- Parent(s): Frank Sherwin Streeter, Lillian Carpenter Streeter

Thomas Winthrop Streeter Sr. (July 20, 1883 – June 12, 1965) was a book collector whose collection of Americana was considered one of the most important of its kind.

== Early life ==
Thomas Winthrop Streeter was born on July 20, 1883, in Concord, New Hampshire, to Lillian (née Carpenter) and Frank S. Streeter. He graduated from St. Paul's School in 1900 and Dartmouth College in 1904. In 1907, he graduated from Harvard Law School.

== Career ==
Following his graduation, Streeter practiced law in Boston. He law practiced at Choate, Hall & Stewart and later became a senior partner of the firm Streeter and Holmes. In 1917, he moved to New York City and was affiliated with banking and business firms there and in Morristown, New Jersey. He was chairman of the board of Simms Petroleum Corporation from 1923 to 1930 and was associated with the liquidation of Bank of United States from 1931 to 1935. In 1939, he retired from his law and financial career to focus his time on collecting historical documents about Americana, including books, maps, pamphlets, and broadsides.

Streeter was president of the Bibliographical Society of America from 1942 to 1943. He was chairman of Friends of the Dartmouth College Library. He was an associate of the John Carter Brown Library and a member of the Council of Fellows of the Pierpont Morgan Library. He was director of Friends Huntington Library. He was a member of the visiting committees of the libraries at Yale, Princeton, Harvard, and the McGregor Library. He was fellow of the California Historical Society and a member of the council of Grolier Club. He was a trustee of the New York Historical Society and served as its treasurer from 1947 to 1964. He served as president of the American Antiquarian Society. He was a member of the Wolpole Society, the Century Association of New York, and the Club of Odd Volumes of Boston.

In February 1957, Streeter sold 2,100 historical Texan Americana to the Yale University Library, including a letter from William B. Travis at The Alamo. His data on early American railroads was provided to the American Antiquarian Society and Harvard Business School.

== Personal life ==
Streeter married Ruth Cheney on July 23, 1917. Their children were Frank S., Henry S., Thomas W. and Lillian.

Streeter died on June 12, 1965, at his home in Morristown. He was buried in Peterborough, New Hampshire.

== Awards ==
In 1946, Streeter was awarded an honorary Doctor of Literature degree from Darthmouth College. In 1957, he was awarded the New York Historical Society's Gold Medal for Distinguished Service. He received the Henry Wagner Memorial Award of the California Historical Society in 1962.
