= William King Atkinson =

American judge (1765–1820)

William King Atkinson (January 6, 1765 – September 29, 1820) was a justice of the New Hampshire Supreme Court from 1803 to 1805, and Attorney General of New Hampshire from 1807 to 1812.

== Early life, education, and career ==
Born in Portsmouth, New Hampshire, to William and Mary (Wendell) King, Atkinson attended the schools of Portsmouth and studied under a private teacher, so that he was admitted to college at the age of fifteen. He did well enough in mathematics that he sought appointment to a professorship in that department. He graduated from Harvard College in 1783, and shortly thereafter studied law with Judge John Pickering in Portsmouth. In February 1786, his uncle, George Atkinson, died, leaving him a large and valuable estate on the condition that he change his surname from King to Atkinson, which he did, with that adoption being sanctioned by an act of the legislature.

He settled in Dover, New Hampshire, in 1787, and became the register of probate for Strafford County, succeeding John Wentworth Jr., who had died. He was also appointed the solicitor of Strafford County.

== Judicial service and later life ==
In 1803, Atkinson was appointed to the state supreme court, serving for two and a half years. However, he also continued to serve as register of probate, and continued to perform the duties of that office, "notwithstanding the provision of the state Constitution which forbade judges to hold any other office than that of justice of the peace." He also did not resign his appointment of county solicitor, though he did not act in that capacity. Jeremiah Mason, then attorney general of the state, took exception to these multiple offices, objecting to the admission of records from the probate office certified by Atkinson on the ground that by accepting the judgeship, Atkinson had vacated his earlier position. Mason also threatened to absent himself from the court when criminal business was considered, on the grounds that Atkinson "might descend from the bench and perform the duties of solicitor."

Atkinson resigned from the Supreme Court in 1805 due to conflict on the pay of associate justices, after Chief Justice Jeremiah Smith received a salary increase.

In February 1807, Atkinson was appointed Attorney General of New Hampshire, a position he held until 1812. He then returned to private practice, and held on to the county register of probate position until 1819, the year before he died.

== Personal life and death ==
On September 3, 1788, Atkinson married Abigail Pickering, daughter of Judge Pickering. They had a daughter, Frances, who married Asa Freeman, a counselor at law.

Towards the end of his life, Atkinson was "said to have fallen into habits of inebriety, so that there were times when he was unfitted for business, and his own affairs were neglected, and suffered in consequence."

Political offices
Preceded by Timothy Farrar	Justice of the New Hampshire Supreme Court; 1803–1805	Succeeded by Richard Evans
