= Alonzo P. Carpenter =

American judge (1829–1898)

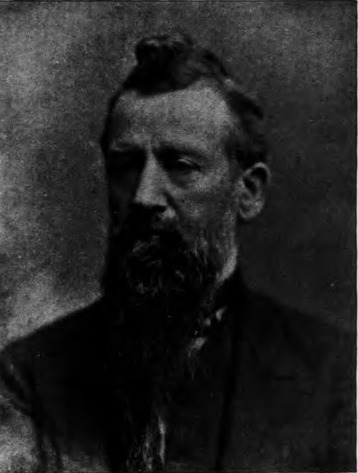
- Born: 28 January 1829; Waterford
- Died: 1898 (aged 68–69)
- Education: Williams College
- Occupation: Judge

Alonzo Philetus Carpenter (January 22, 1829 – May 21, 1898) was an associate justice of the New Hampshire Supreme Court from 1881 to 1896, and was chief justice of that court from 1896 to 1898.

== Early life, education, and career ==
Born in Waterford, Vermont, Carpenter attended St. Johnsbury Academy, entered Williams College in 1845 and graduated in 1849. He then became principal of the high school in Bath, New Hampshire, where he also read law in the office of Ira Goodall, gaining admission to the bar in New Hampshire in 1853. He entered the private practice of law in Bath, also serving as County Solicitor (the prosecuting officer) for Grafton County from 1863 to 1873. A Republican, Carpenter became "one of the foremost lawyers of the State, if not one of the leaders of the Bar".

== Judicial service ==
In September 1881, Governor Charles H. Bell appointed Carpenter to the New Hampshire Supreme Court, and Carpenter therefore moved to Concord, the state capital. On March 26, 1896, Governor Charles A. Busiel elevated Carpenter to the office of Chief Justice, which had been vacated by the death of Chief Justice Charles Cogswell Doe. This was "in response to the almost unanimous voice of the Bar of the State". Carpenter assumed the office on April 1, 1896, and remained until his death.

Carpenter was prominently mentioned in connection with the vacancy on the bench of the United States Circuit Court, in the First Circuit, caused by the resignation of Judge John Lowell in 1884. His appointment was "urged with great vigor by the entire New Hampshire Bar," but President Chester A. Arthur appointed LeBaron B. Colt of Rhode Island instead.

== Personal life and death ==
Carpenter married Julia R. Goddall in Bath in 1852. She had been one of his students during his time as principal of the high school there. Of their five children, four were living at the time of his death, among them Philip Carpenter, who practiced law in the city of New York, having been in partnership with his father before Carpenter's appointment to the bench. His second daughter, Edith, the wife of Bond V. Thomas, of Millville, New Jersey, wrote a prize-winning story for a competition sponsored by the New York Herald. Lilian Carpenter Streeter was a social reformer, clubwoman, and author.

The degree of LL. D. was conferred upon Judge Carpenter by Williams College in 1889. He suffered a paralytic stroke while on the bench at Concord, and died a few days later.

Political offices
Preceded by Charles Cogswell Doe	Chief Justice of the New Hampshire Supreme Court; 1896–1898	Succeeded by Lewis W. Clark
Political offices
Preceded by William Lawrence Foster	Justice of the New Hampshire Supreme Court; 1881–1896	Succeeded by Robert G. Pike
