= Samuel Dana Bell =

American judge (1798–1868)

Chief Justice of the Superior Court of Judicature
- In office September 30, 1859 – August 1, 1864
- Preceded by: Ira Perley
- Succeeded by: Ira Perley

Associate Justice of the Superior Court of Judicature
- In office 1849–1855

Member of the New Hampshire House of Representatives
- In office 1825–1825

Personal details
- Born: October 9, 1798 Francestown, New Hampshire
- Died: July 31, 1868 (aged 69) Manchester, New Hampshire
- Profession: Lawyer

Samuel Dana Bell (October 9, 1798 – July 31, 1868), was the chief justice of the New Hampshire Superior Court of Judicature from September 30, 1859 to August 1, 1864.

Bell was a member of the New Hampshire House of Representatives in 1825.

From 1849 to 1859 Bell was an associate justice of the Superior Court of Judicature.

Bell was born in Francestown, New Hampshire on October 9, 1798. He was the eldest son to Samuel Bell, governor of New Hampshire and United States Senator, and Mehitable Bowen Dana, and graduated from Harvard University in 1816.

Bell died in Manchester, New Hampshire on July 31, 1868.

Legal offices
Preceded by Ira Perley	Chief Justice of the New Hampshire; Superior Court of Judicature; September 30, 1859-August 1, 1864	Succeeded by Ira Perley
