= Goodnow Hall =

Goodnow Hall may refer to:

- Goodnow Hall (Grinnell College), Grinnell, Iowa, listed on the NRHP in Poweshiek County, Iowa
- Goodnow Hall (Kansas State University), Manhattan, Kansas
- Goodnow Hall, Huguenot College, Wellington, a heritage site in the Western Cape Province, South Africa
- The town hall of Charlemont, Massachusetts
