= Joel Parker (jurist) =

American judge

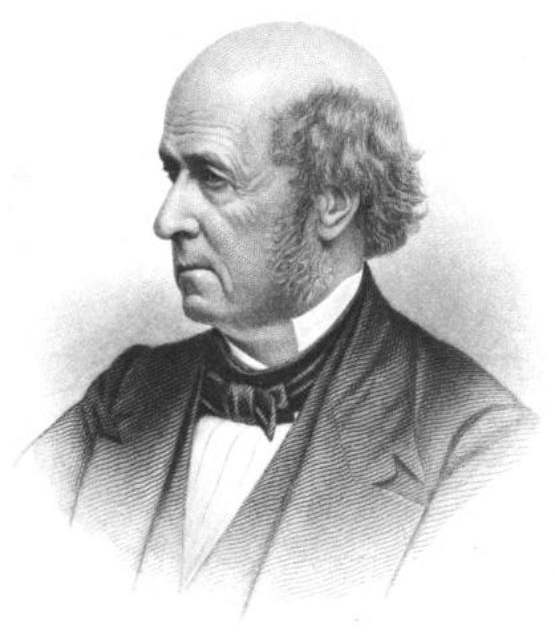

Chief Justice of the New Hampshire Supreme Court
- In office 1838–1848

Associate Justice of the New Hampshire Supreme Court
- In office 1833–1838

Member of the New Hampshire Legislature
- In office 1824–1826

Personal details
- Born: January 25, 1795 Jaffrey, New Hampshire, U.S.
- Died: August 17, 1875 (aged 80) Cambridge, Massachusetts, U.S.
- Education: Dartmouth College
- Occupation: Jurist
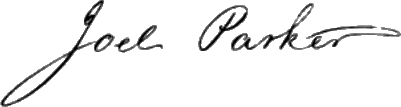
- Signature

Joel Parker (January 25, 1795 – August 17, 1875) was an American jurist from New Hampshire.

== Biography ==
Joel Parker was born at Jaffrey, New Hampshire on January 25, 1795. He studied at Groton Academy, and later Dartmouth College, where he graduated in 1811.

After studying law, he practiced at Keene. From 1824 to 1826, he was a member of the New Hampshire Legislature. He was appointed an associate justice of the New Hampshire Supreme Court in 1833 and became chief justice in 1838. He held this post until his resignation in 1848. He gave an Address to Phi Beta Kappa in 1848 called "Progress." It was incredibly optimistic, a typical position of the Democratic Party. He studied at Groton Academy.

In 1840 he was chairman of the committee on the revision of the New Hampshire statutes. From 1847 to 1857, he was professor of medical jurisprudence at Dartmouth. In 1848 he became a professor at the Harvard Law School, where he served until his death. In 1856, he held that the United States could not be expanded through the admission of additional slave states. In 1861, he held that President Jefferson Davis had no constitutional right of secession. Nevertheless, during the American Civil War, he opposed what he regarded as unconstitutional exercises of power by President Abraham Lincoln.

Joel Parker died in Cambridge, Massachusetts on August 17, 1875.

== Works ==
- Progress: An Address before the Phi Beta Kappa Society of Dartmouth College (Hanover, New Hampshire, 1846) https://books.google.com/books/about/Progress_An_address_before_the_Phi_Beta.html?id=b7ZcAAAAcAAJ
- Daniel Webster as a Jurist, an address to the Harvard Law School (Cambridge, Massachusetts, 1853)
- A Charge to the Grand Jury on the Uncertainty of Law (1854)
- Non-Extension of Slavery (1856)
- Personal Liberty Laws (1861)
- The Right of Secession (1861)
- Constitutional Law (1862)
- Habeas Corpus and Martial Law (Philadelphia, 1862)
- The War Powers of Congress and of the President (1863)
- Revolution and Reconstruction (1866)
- The Three Powers of Government (1869)
- Conflict of Decisions (1875)
