= Edward Samuel Goodnow =

American cartoonist

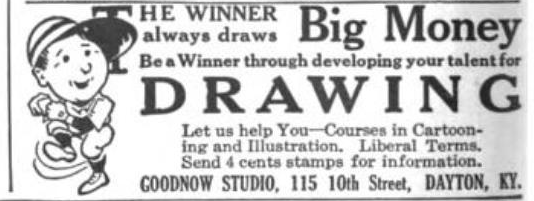
Edward Samuel Goodnow advertisement for Goodnow Studio in Dayton, Kentucky in 1919 in Cartoons Magazine

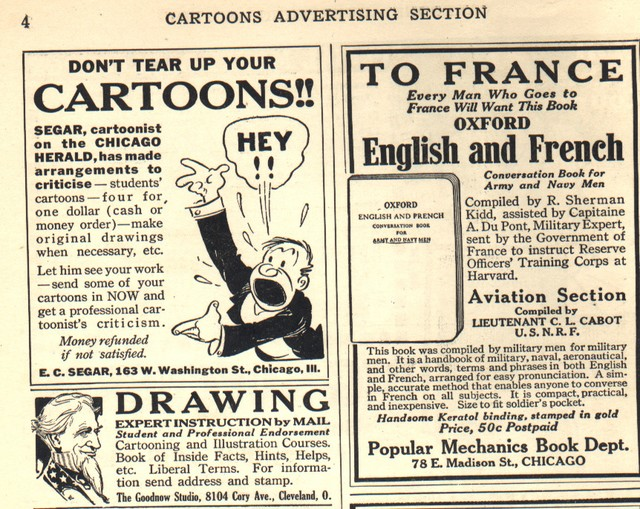
Goodnow Studio in April 1918 in Cleveland, Ohio

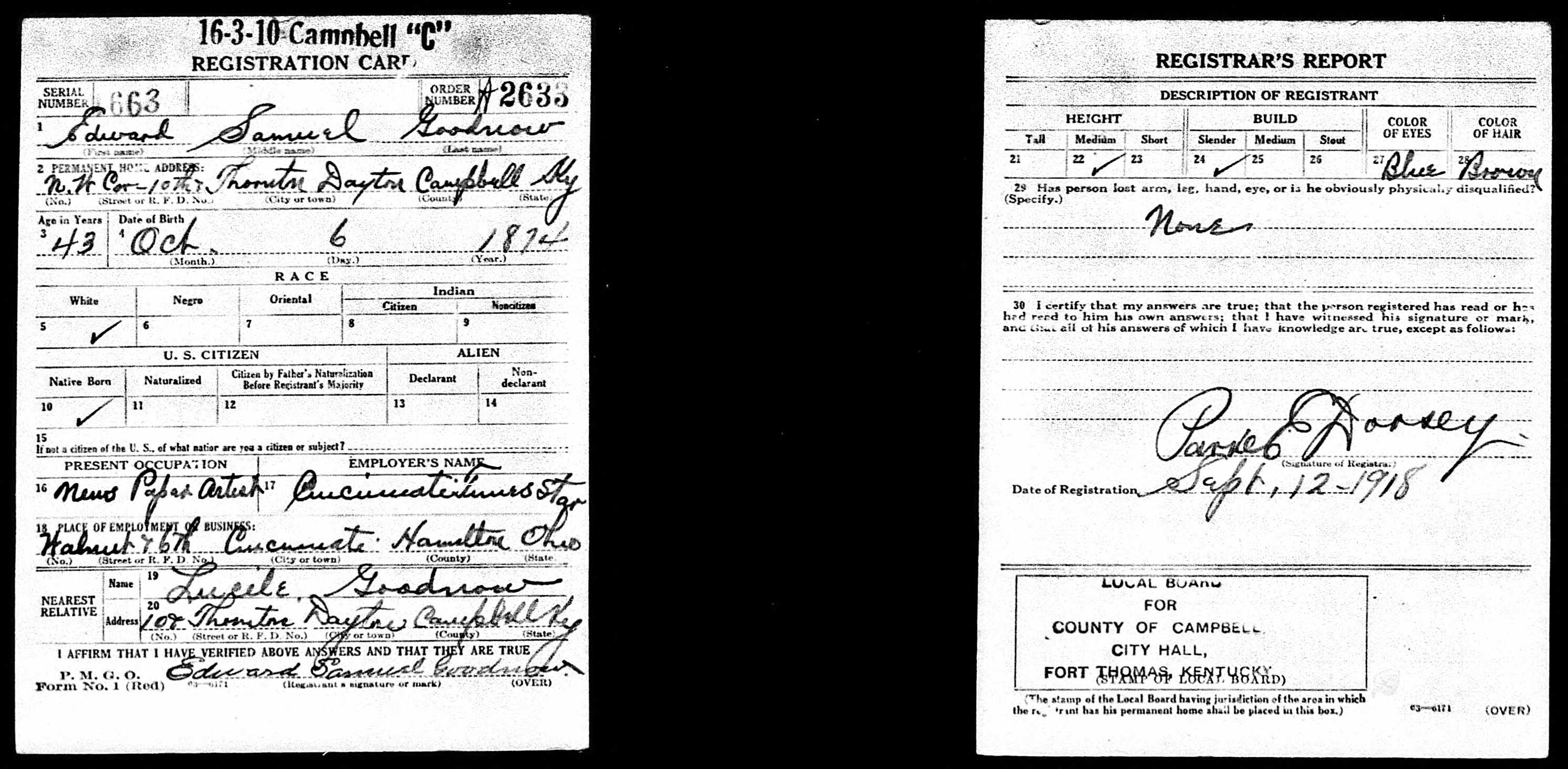
Edward Samuel Goodnow in the WWI draft registration

Edward Samuel Goodnow (October 6, 1874 – January 3, 1949) was a newspaper illustrator and author. He operated an art school for illustrators.

== Biography ==
He was born on October 6, 1874, in Missouri to Charles Edward Goodnow (1842–1916). One of his earliest jobs was working at the Laning Printing Company. On September 17, 1902, he married Lucille Nichols. By 1910 he was living in Euclid, Ohio. In 1914 he wrote Inside Facts about the Earnings, Methods and Requirements of the Newspaper Artist and Advertisement Illustrator: Hints and Helps for the Student of Practical Drawing. By 1918 he was living in Dayton, Kentucky but still working for the Cincinnati Times Star in Cincinnati, Ohio. He died on January 3, 1949, in Bethel, Ohio.

== Publications ==
- Goodnow Studio of Practical Drawing, Bellevue, Ohio (1905)
- Inside Facts about the Earnings, Methods and Requirements of the Newspaper Artist and Advertisement Illustrator: Hints and Helps for the Student of Practical Drawing (1914)

== See also ==
- Art Instruction Schools and their Draw Winky campaign
