= Goodnow Mountain =

Mountain in New York, United States

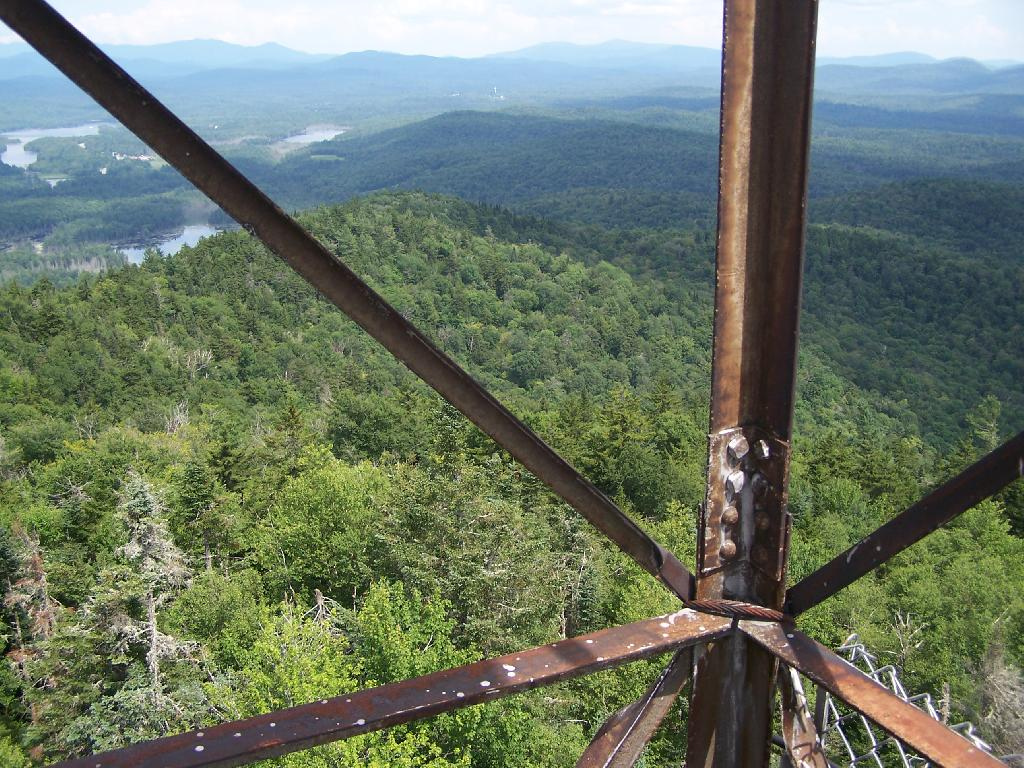
- View from Goodnow Mountain Fire Tower

Highest point
- Elevation: 2,664 feet (812 m)
- Coordinates: 43°57′37″N 74°12′35″W

Geography
- Location within New York Adirondack Park Location within the United States
- Topo map: USGS Newcomb

Goodnow Mountain is a 2,664-foot-tall (812 m) peak in the Adirondack Mountains of New York in the United States. It is the location of the Goodnow Mountain Fire Observation Station. In 1922, the Civilian Conservation Corps built a 60-foot-tall fire tower on the mountain. The tower closed at the end of the 1979 season. The tower was later transferred to SUNY College of Forestry and is now open to the public.

== History ==
Goodnow Mountain is named for Sylvester Goodnow, a homesteader who settled at the base of the mountain in the 1820s. Later on the surrounding acreage and mountain were purchased by the Huntington family. In 1932, Annie and Archer Huntington donated their 15,000 acres (61 km^{2}) property to the State University of New York.

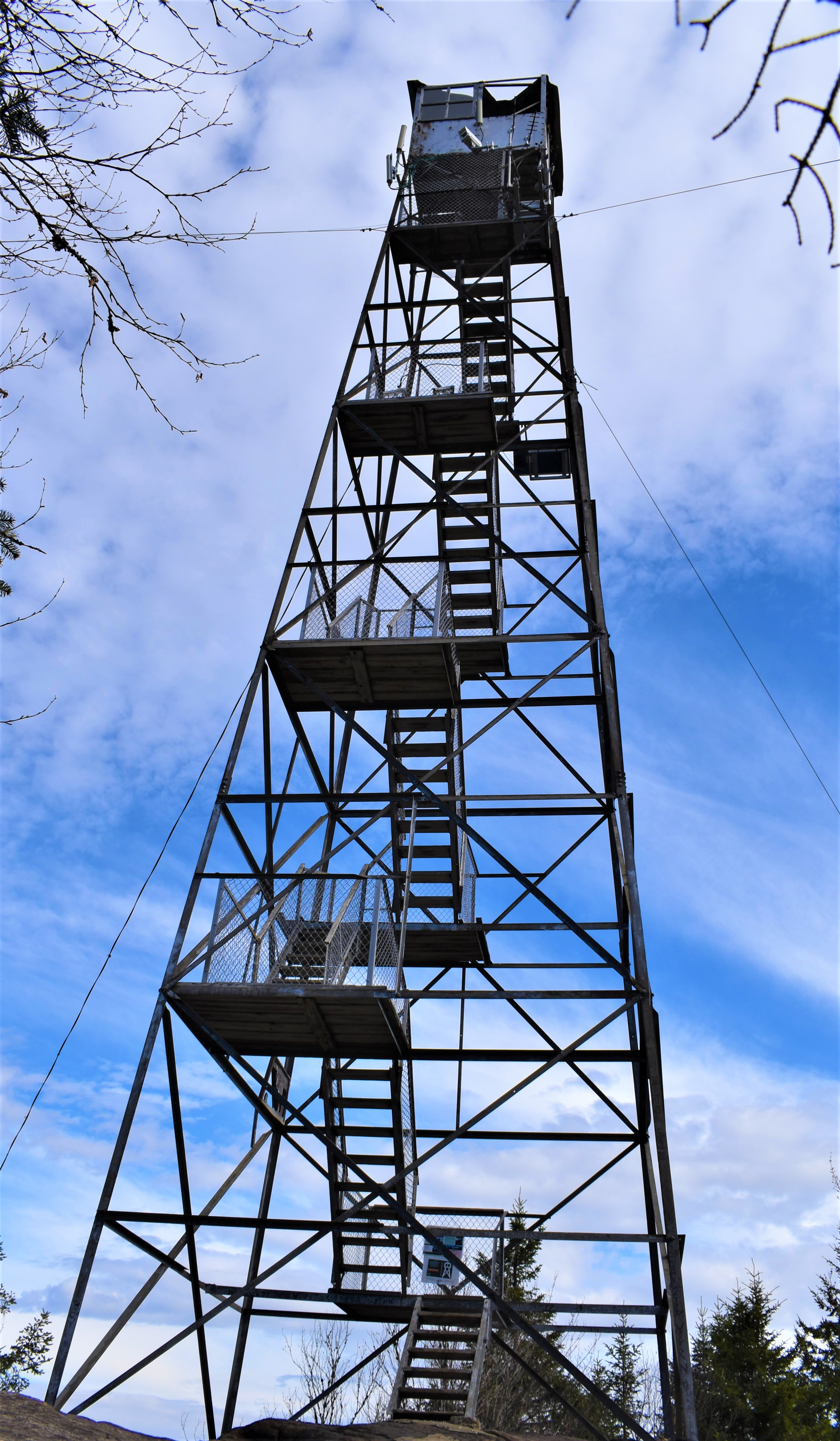
Fire tower on May 3, 2021

Goodnow Mountain was chosen for the location of a fire observation station in the town of Newcomb in Essex county, in 1921. A steel tower was secured through cooperation of landowners and lumbermen operating in the area, who hoped to have it operational in 1922. In Spring of 1922, a 60-foot-tall (18 m) Aermotor LS40 tower was built by the Civilian Conservation Corps. The tower ceased fire watching operations and closed at the end of the 1979 season. The tower was later transferred to SUNY College of Forestry. The tower and cabin have been completely restored by the SUNY College of Forestry and is open to the public. The fire tower is listed on the National Historic Lookout Register.
