= J. Everett Sargent =

American judge (1816–1890)

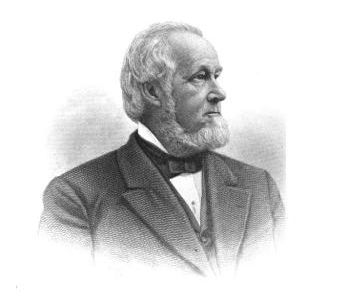

Chief Justice of the Superior Court of Judicature
- In office 1873–1874
- Preceded by: Henry Adams Bellows
- Succeeded by: Edmund L. Cushing

President of the New Hampshire Senate
- In office 1854–1855
- Preceded by: James M. Rix
- Succeeded by: William Haile

Member of the New Hampshire Senate

Speaker of the New Hampshire House of Representatives
- In office 1853–1854
- Preceded by: George W. Kittredge
- Succeeded by: Francis R. Chase

Personal details
- Born: October 23, 1816 New London, New Hampshire
- Died: January 6, 1890 (aged 73) Concord, New Hampshire
- Party: Republican
- Education: Dartmouth College A.B. 1840, A.M. 1843
- Profession: Lawyer
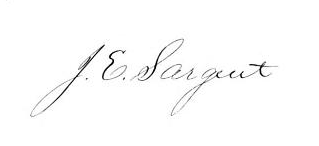
- Signature

Jonathan Everett Sargent (October 23, 1816 – January 6, 1890) was an American lawyer and politician who served as the Speaker of the New Hampshire House of Representatives, as the President of the New Hampshire Senate and as the chief justice of the New Hampshire Superior Court of Judicature.

== Early life ==
Sargent was born in New London, New Hampshire on October 23, 1816.

== Family ==
Sargent's father was Ebenezer Sargent (1768 - 1859), his mother was Prudence Chase (1774 - 1858).

Sargent had 5 children. Marie Louise Sargent (1856 - 1894), Annie Lawrie Sargent (1862 - 1865), George Lincoln Sargent (1863 - 1894) and John Jones Sargent (Unknown - 1870).

== Education ==
Sargent graduated from Dartmouth College receiving his A.B. in 1840, and his A.M. in 1843

Sargent was appointed as the Chief Justice March 17, 1873, his term ended when the New Hampshire Superior Court of Judicature was abolished on August 17, 1874.

== Notes ==
Legal offices
Preceded by	Associate Justice of the New Hampshire; Superior Court of Judicature; 1859-1873	Succeeded by
Preceded by Henry Adams Bellows	Chief Justice of New Hampshire; 1873-1874	Succeeded by Edmund L. Cushing
Political offices
Preceded by James M. Rix	President of the New Hampshire Senate; 1854-1855	Succeeded by William Haile
Preceded by George W. Kittredge	Speaker of the New Hampshire House of Representatives; 1853 - 1854	Succeeded by Francis R. Chase
