= Frank R. Kenison =

American judge (1907–1980)

Frank Rowe Kenison (November 1, 1907 – December 14, 1980) was a New Hampshire lawyer and judge who served as Attorney General of New Hampshire from 1940 to 1942, and on the New Hampshire Supreme Court from 1946 to 1977, serving as chief justice for 28 years, from 1952 to 1977.

== Early life, education, and military service ==
Born in Conway, New Hampshire, to Arthur Edon and Isadore Rowe Kenison, Kenison received a B.A. from Dartmouth College in 1929 followed by a law degree from the Boston University School of Law in 1932, gaining admission to the bar in New Hampshire the same year. He then entered the practice of law in Conway, and served as the solicitor of Carroll County, New Hampshire, from 1935 to 1937.

In 1937, Kenison became an assistant attorney general of New Hampshire, and on December 16, 1940, Governor Francis P. Murphy named Kenison Attorney General of New Hampshire. In 1942, Kenison took a leave of absence from the position to serve in the United States Navy during World War II. He endorsed his assistant, Ernest D. D'Amours, to succeed him, but the state council approved Governor Robert O. Blood's nominee, Stephen M. Wheeler, by a 3-2 vote. Kenison ultimately served with the U.S. Naval Reserve until 1945, and then returned to the position of attorney general from 1945 to 1946.

== Judicial service ==
On February 8, 1946, Kenison, then 38 years old, was nominated by Governor Charles M. Dale to a seat on the state supreme court set to be vacated by Justice Elwin L. Page reaching the state's mandatory retirement age of 70. On February 29, 1952, Governor Sherman Adams nominated Kenison for elevation to chief justice, to succeed the retiring Chief Justice Francis Wayland Johnston. Kenison became "known nationally as an instructor of judges", and served as chairman of the Chief Justices of the United States. He himself served until he reached the mandatory retirement age in 1977.

After his retirement from the court, Kenison became chairman of the board of overseers of the Franklin Pierce Law Center, serving in that capacity until his death.

== Personal life and death ==
On April 8, 1939, Kenison married Loretta M. Landry (1913–2017), with whom he had three children. He died at a hospital in Concord, New Hampshire, following a brief illness, at the age of 73. He was interred at Blossom Hill Cemetery.

== Honors ==
Kenison is the chapter namesake for the Phi Alpha Delta chapter at the University of New Hampshire School of Law, chartered in 1974. Following his retirement from the court in 1977, the courthouse was renamed the Frank Rowe Kenison Supreme Court Building.

Political offices
Preceded by Elwin L. Page	Associate Justice of the New Hampshire Supreme Court; 1946–1952	Succeeded by John Richard Goodnow
Preceded by Francis Wayland Johnston	Chief Justice of the New Hampshire Supreme Court; 1952–1977	Succeeded by Edward John Lampron
