= Elwin L. Page =

American judge (1876–1974)

Elwin Lawrence Page (1876 – January 12, 1974) was New Hampshire attorney and historian who served as a justice of the New Hampshire Supreme Court from 1934 to 1946.

Born in Concord, New Hampshire, Page received his undergraduate degree from Williams College in 1900, followed by a law degree from Harvard Law School in 1902. From 1931 to 1934, he was a justice on the New Hampshire Superior Court, and on September 29, 1934, Governor John G. Winant nominated Page to a seat on the state supreme court, to succeed John E. Allen, whom Winant had elevated to chief justice pending the retirement of sitting chief justice Robert E. Peaslee. Both prior to and after his judgeship, Page was in private practice in Concord.

He was also a historian and author, and was a member of the New Hampshire Historical Society for over 50 years. He died in 1974 at his son's home in Douglaston, New York.

Political offices
Preceded by John E. Allen	Justice of the New Hampshire Supreme Court; 1934–1946	Succeeded by Frank R. Kenison
