= Samuel Livermore =

American politician judge

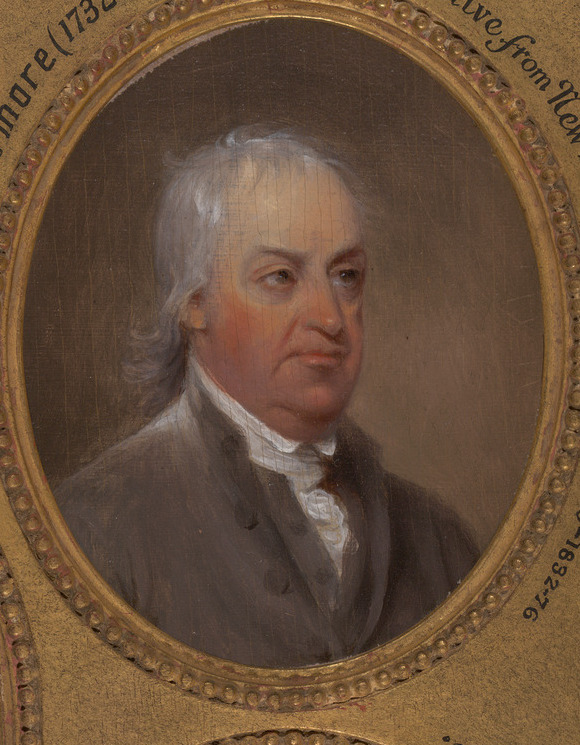
- Portrait by John Trumbull, c. 1790

President pro tempore of the United States Senate
- In office December 2, 1799 – December 29, 1799
- Preceded by: James Ross
- Succeeded by: Uriah Tracy
- In office May 6, 1796 – December 4, 1796
- Preceded by: Henry Tazewell
- Succeeded by: William Bingham
- In office March 4, 1793 – June 12, 1801
- Preceded by: Paine Wingate
- Succeeded by: Simeon Olcott

Member of the U.S. House of Representatives from New Hampshire's 3rd at-large district
- In office March 4, 1789 – March 3, 1793
- Preceded by: Office established
- Succeeded by: John Samuel Sherburne

Personal details
- Born: May 14, 1732 Waltham, Province of Massachusetts Bay, British America
- Died: May 18, 1803 (aged 71) Holderness, New Hampshire, U.S.
- Party: Pro-Administration; Federalist
- Education: College of New Jersey (renamed Princeton)
- Profession: Law

Samuel Livermore (May 14, 1732 – May 18, 1803) was an American politician and judge who served as the U.S. senator from New Hampshire from 1793 to 1801 and served as the president pro tempore of the United States Senate in 1796 and again in 1799.

== Life and career ==
Livermore was born in Waltham in the Province of Massachusetts Bay, the son of Hannah (Brown) and Samuel Livermore, and attended Waltham schools. He graduated from the College of New Jersey (now Princeton University) in 1752, then studied law, was admitted to the bar in 1756, and commenced practice in Waltham. He moved to Portsmouth, in 1758 and later to Londonderry. He was a member of the New Hampshire General Court (the state's general assembly) 1768–1769. He was judge-advocate in the Admiralty court and Attorney General from 1769 to 1774. He moved to Holderness in 1775 and was State attorney for three years.

Livermore was a member of the Continental Congress from 1780 to 1782 and again from 1785 to 1786. He was chief justice of the New Hampshire Superior Court of Judicature from 1782 to 1789, and a member of the State constitutional convention in 1788. He was elected to the United States House of Representatives for the First and Second Congresses, serving from March 4, 1789, to March 4, 1793, and served as the chairman of the House Committee on Elections in the Second Congress. Livermore was one of seven representatives to vote against the Fugitive Slave Act of 1793.

Livermore was president of the state constitutional convention in 1791 and in 1792 was elected as a Federalist to the United States Senate and was reelected in 1798 and served from March 4, 1793, until his resignation effective June 12, 1801, due to ill health. He served as president pro tempore of the Senate during the Fourth and Sixth Congresses. The defunct town of Livermore, New Hampshire was named after him.

Livermore died in Holderness, New Hampshire, and is interred in Trinity Churchyard there. He is featured on a New Hampshire historical marker (number 39) along New Hampshire Route 175 in Holderness.

Livermore was the father of Arthur Livermore, a U.S. representative from New Hampshire, and Edward St. Loe Livermore, a U.S. representative from Massachusetts.

U.S. House of Representatives
Preceded by Seat established	Member of the House of Representatives from New Hampshire's at-large (Seat 3) congressional district 1789–1793	Succeeded by John Samuel Sherburne
U.S. Senate
Preceded by Paine Wingate	U.S. senator (Class 2) from New Hampshire; 1793–1801; Served alongside: John Langdon, James Sheafe	Succeeded by Simeon Olcott
Political offices
Preceded by Henry Tazewell	President pro tempore of the United States Senate; May 6, 1796 – December 4, 1796	Succeeded by William Bingham
Preceded by James Ross	President pro tempore of the United States Senate; December 2, 1799 – December 29, 1799	Succeeded by Uriah Tracy
