= John Richard Goodnow =

American judge (1906–1972)

John Richard Goodnow (1906 – April 27, 1972) was a justice of the New Hampshire Supreme Court from 1952 to 1957.

Born in Jaffrey, New Hampshire, Goodnow received an undergraduate degree from Dartmouth College and a law degree from Harvard Law School. Prior to becoming a judge, he was a Cheshire County attorney and city solicitor.

Governor Sherman Adams elevated Goodnow from the state superior court to the state supreme court on February 29, 1952. After retiring, he became an attorney in Keene.

Political offices
Preceded by Frank R. Kenison	Justice of the New Hampshire Supreme Court; 1952–1957	Succeeded by Stephen Morse Wheeler
