= William Martin Chase =

American judge

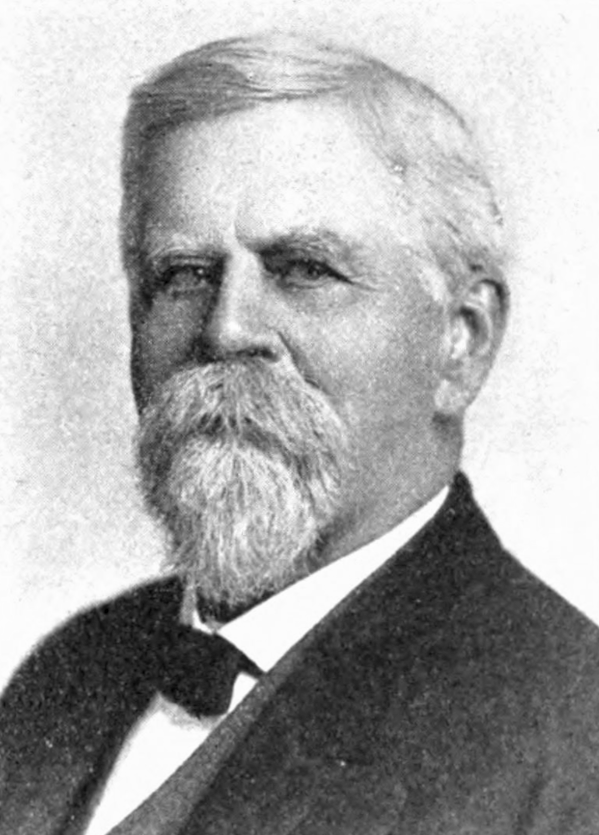
- Born: December 28, 1837; Canaan, New Hampshire
- Died: February 3, 1918 (aged 80); Concord, New Hampshire
- Education: Dartmouth College
- Occupation: Jurist
- Spouse: Ellen S. Abbott (m. 1863)
- Children: 1

Signature
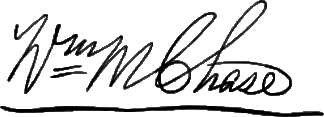

William Martin Chase (December 28, 1837 – February 3, 1918) was a justice of the Supreme Court of New Hampshire.

== Biography ==
Chase was born in Canaan, New Hampshire. He attended Canaan Union Academy and Kimball Union Academy. He then studied at Dartmouth College. He was also a trustee of the State Normal School and State Library.

He married Ellen S. Abbott on March 18, 1863, and they had one son.

In 1909, Chase was president of the New Hampshire Bar Association.

He died at his home in Concord on February 3, 1918.
