= William Alvan Grimes =

American judge (1911–1999)

William Alvan Grimes (July 4, 1911 – February 28, 1999) was a justice of the New Hampshire Supreme Court from 1966 to 1981, serving as chief justice from 1979 to 1981.

Born in Dover, New Hampshire, Grimes received a B.S. from the University of New Haven in 1934, and a J.D. from the Boston University School of Law in 1937. He gained admission to the bar in New Hampshire the same year, and joined the Rochester, New Hampshire, law firm of Cooper & Hall, becoming a partner in 1941. Grimes served in the New Hampshire House of Representatives from 1933 to 1935 and again from 1937 to 1939.

During World War II, Grimes served in the United States Navy Reserve. After working as solicitor for the City of Dover from 1946 to 1947, he held a seat on the Superior Court of New Hampshire from 1947 until his appointment to the state supreme court in 1966. He was a founding faculty member of the National Judicial College, and author of an influential annual summary of U.S. Supreme Court criminal law cases titled Grimes' Criminal Law Outline.

Grimes died at a retirement home in Maine at the age of 87.

Political offices
Preceded by Amos Noyes Blandin Jr.	Justice of the New Hampshire Supreme Court; 1966–1981	Succeeded by John W. King
