= Henry Adams Bellows (justice) =

American judge

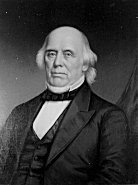
- Portrait by Adna Tenney (1810–1900)

Chief Justice of the New Hampshire Superior Court of Judicature
- In office 1869 – March 11, 1873
- Preceded by: Ira Perley
- Succeeded by: Jonathan Everett Sargent

Associate Justice of the New Hampshire Superior Court of Judicature
- In office September 23, 1859 – 1869

Member of the New Hampshire House of Representatives
- In office 1839, 1856–1857

Personal details
- Born: October 25, 1803 Walpole, New Hampshire, U.S.
- Died: March 11, 1873 (aged 69)
- Parent(s): Joseph Bellows; Mary Adams
- Profession: Politician, lawyer, jurist

Henry Adams Bellows (October 25, 1803 – March 11, 1873) was an American lawyer, state legislator, and jurist born in Walpole, New Hampshire October 25, 1803 to Joseph and Mary (Adams) Bellows. He was educated at the academy at Windsor, Vermont. He taught school in Walpole and studied law under William C. Bradley, being admitted to the bar in 1826. He practiced in Littleton, New Hampshire from 1828 to 1850, moving to Concord, New Hampshire. He was elected to the New Hampshire House of Representatives from Littleton in 1839. He was subsequently elected again to the House from Concord in 1856 and 1857, and served as Chairman of the Judiciary Committee. On 23 September 1859 he was appointed associate justice to the New Hampshire Supreme Court, where he served as a justice from 1859 to 1869 and Chief Justice from 1869 until his death on March 11, 1873.

Legal offices
Preceded by Ira Perley	Chief Justice of the New Hampshire; Superior Court of Judicature; 1869-1873	Succeeded by Jonathan Everett Sargent
