= Frank Nesmith Parsons =

American judge (1854–1934)

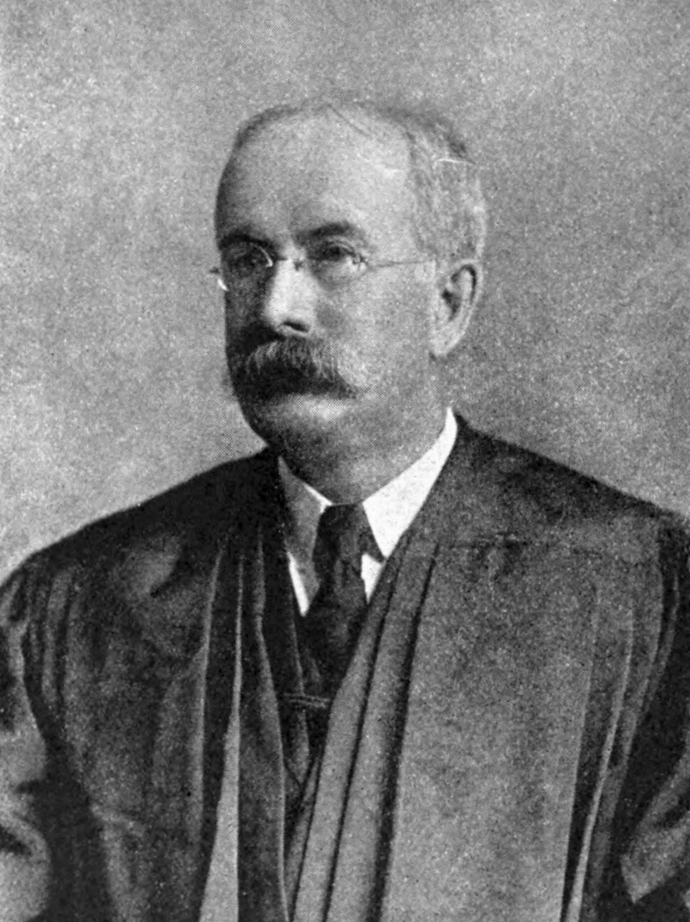

Member of the New Hampshire House of Representatives
- In office 1925–1928

Chief Justice of the New Hampshire Supreme Court
- In office 1902–1924

Associate Justice of the New Hampshire Supreme Court
- In office 1895–1902

Mayor of Franklin, New Hampshire
- In office 1895

Member of the Executive Council of New Hampshire
- In office 1893–1894

Personal details
- Born: September 3, 1854 Dover, New Hampshire
- Died: August 9, 1934 (aged 79) Franklin, New Hampshire
- Party: Republican
- Spouse: Helen F. Pike (m. 1880; died 1914)
- Education: Pinkerton Academy; Dartmouth College
- Occupation: Jurist

Frank Nesmith Parsons (Note: Some sources spell his middle name "Naismith".) (September 3, 1854 – August 9, 1934) was a lawyer, politician, and Chief Justice of the New Hampshire Supreme Court from 1902 to 1924.

== Biography ==
Parsons was born in Dover, New Hampshire on September 3, 1854, the son of Rev. Benjamin F. Parsons, a New Hampshire Congregational minister. He was educated at Pinkerton Academy in Derry, New Hampshire and at Dartmouth College, graduating in the class of 1874.

After teaching for several years, Parsons studied law and passed the bar in 1879. He became the law partner of Austin F. Pike, a lawyer and politician; their partnership continued until Pike's death in 1886. Parsons married Pike's daughter Helen on October 26, 1880. She died on March 6, 1914.

Parsons was appointed the State Law Reporter in 1891. A Republican, from 1893 to 1894 he served on the New Hampshire Executive Council. In 1895 Parsons was elected as the first mayor of Franklin, and in the same year he was appointed an associate justice of the New Hampshire Supreme Court. In 1902 he became Chief Justice, and continued in this post until 1924. In 1912, Parsons was also president of the New Hampshire Bar Association. From 1925 to 1928 he served as a state representative. In 1889 and 1930 he represented Franklin at state constitutional conventions, serving as president of the convention in 1930.

Parsons was involved in community affairs, serving on the Franklin school board and board of water commissioners, as president or director of several local banks, as president of the board of trustees at Pinkerton Academy, president of Franklin Hospital, and president of the New Hampshire Historical Society.

He died at his home in Franklin on August 9, 1934.
