= Charles Cogswell Doe =

American judge (1830–1896)

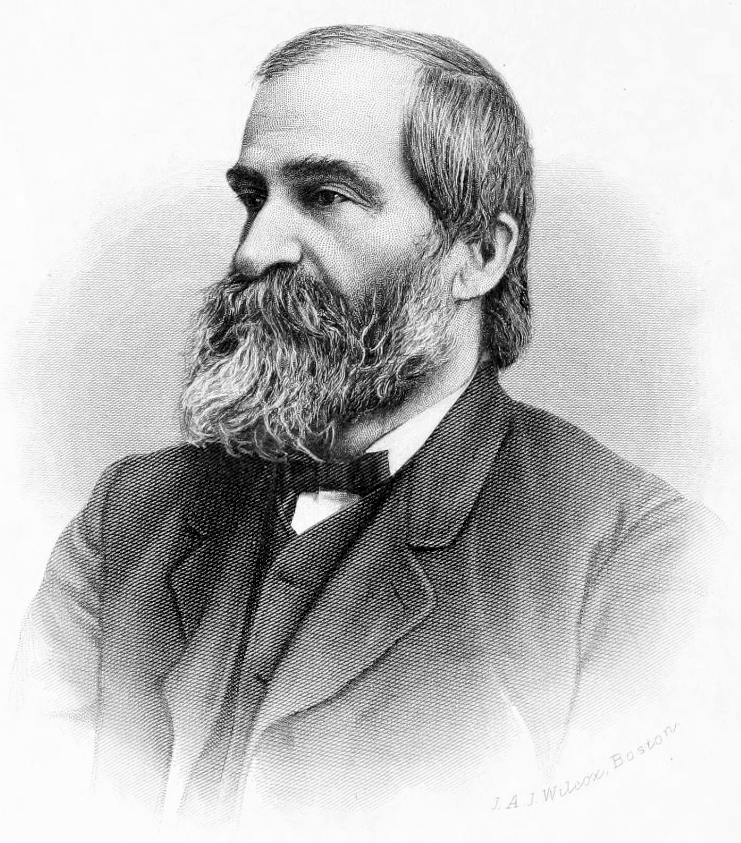

Personal details
- Born: April 11, 1830 Derry, New Hampshire
- Died: March 9, 1896 (aged 65) Rollinsford, New Hampshire
- Spouse: Edith Haven (m. 1865)
- Children: 9, including Jessie and Haven
- Education: Dartmouth College
- Occupation: Jurist

Charles Cogswell Doe (April 11, 1830 – March 9, 1896) was an associate justice of the Supreme Judicial Court of New Hampshire from 1859 to 1874, and then, after a brief period when the court was dissolved to be reorganized as the New Hampshire Supreme Court, as chief justice from 1876 to 1896. Roscoe Pound called Doe one of the ten greatest jurists in American history, the "one judge upon the bench of a state court who stands out as a builder of the law since the Civil War." A contemporary commentator has described Doe as "the most creative state judge of the nineteenth century."

== Early life and education ==
Doe was born to Joseph and Mary Bodwell Ricker Doe in Derry, New Hampshire, on April 11, 1830. He spent his boyhood in the Salmon Falls section of Somersworth, New Hampshire. Doe began his education at Berwick Academy in Maine, and in 1844 Doe entered Phillips Exeter Academy. In 1845, Doe's father withdrew him from Exeter and enrolled him in Phillips Academy at Andover, which was less expensive.

In autumn of 1845, Doe entered Harvard College where he stayed for only a year, possibly having been expelled for an incident in which he threw a tree stump through the dormitory window of an upperclassman who had tormented him in a hazing ritual. After leaving Harvard, Doe entered Dartmouth College, from which he graduated in 1849, having been elected to Phi Beta Kappa. Doe was bitter about the education he received at Dartmouth, calling it a "barbaric classical course" of study.

Upon graduation from Dartmouth, Doe began studying for the bar in the office of Dover attorney Daniel Miltmore Christie, one of the most successful New Hampshire attorneys in training students. After three years of study with Christie, Doe enrolled in Harvard Law School at a time when the school's quality was at its "low ebb". Doe left Harvard Law School without earning a degree, instead returning to Dover in January 1854 to be admitted to the bar. As Doe recalled years later, admittance to the bar had no requirements except that the applicant be twenty-one years of age: "age and good moral character were the only necessary qualifications. Legal knowledge and skill were not required."

In 2003, descendants of Doe donated to the library of the Woodman Institute Museum a 78-page diary covering eight months in Doe's life, between July 1852 and February 1853. According to Jay Surdukowski, Doe's early diary "reveals a hopeful youth struggling to come into his own in a tumultous [sic] time." In a long article about the journal, Surdukowski writes:

Doe's early musings on his chosen career path are uncanny in their modesty. Considering the prominence Doe will achieve in nineteenth century jurisprudence and the shadow he still casts today, 116 years after his death, one is struck by how little Doe actually dwells on the law in the diary. Most of the ink is spilled on other pursuits. His notes on court sessions tend to be perfunctory – records of verdicts, poor jury charges, satchels of work brought back by his mentor Mr. Christie. Perhaps this is why Doe grew up to be the judge and humane personage he would become — his training was spent becoming a well-rounded person in addition to a well-rounded lawyer.

== Personal life ==
Doe married Edith Haven, who was ten years his junior, on April 11, 1865. They had nine children (four boys and five girls) including state legislator Haven Doe, state court judge Robert Doe, and Jessie Doe, one of the first women elected to the New Hampshire House of Representatives. The family resided at the former Ricker Inn in Rollinsford, New Hampshire.

== Law practice ==
Soon after his admission to the bar, Doe was appointed solicitor of Strafford County, the county's chief prosecuting officer. In February 1855 Doe represented the state in the Hodge Case, a first-degree murder prosecution that marked Doe's first appearance before a jury. The trial ended in a mistrial due to a hung jury. Doe was removed from office as county solicitor on a charge of neglect of his duty, less than two years into his term of six years. Doe's biographer, John Phillip Reid, suggests that Doe's removal was part of an 1855 "political revolution" in New Hampshire in which hundreds of Democrats were removed from office by the legislature.

After his removal as county solicitor, Doe devoted his attention to his law practice in a partnership he formed with attorney Charles W. Woodman. Although little is known of Doe's law practice, his biographer reports that Doe was attorney of record on 223 separate actions filed in Strafford County between April 1854, when he was admitted to the bar, and September 1859, when he was appointed to the bench. John Philip Reid notes that during Doe's private practice of law, he both exploited and argued against the use of technicalities that he would later be instrumental in eliminating from New Hampshire law.

== Judicial career ==
As a judge, Doe showed a zeal for reform that had significant influence not only in New Hampshire, but on American law as a whole. He achieved a great deal in his effort to simplify antiquated rules of pleading, reform the rules of evidence, and dispense with formalities and ceremonies that stood in the way of speedy, efficient disposition of cases. Doe is thought to have written opinions ostensibly authored by other judges, in an effort to conceal his influence in guiding certain reforms in the law.

One area of great interest to Doe was the reform of jurisprudence involving the question of insanity. He engaged in a lengthy correspondence with distinguished psychiatrist Isaac Ray. Doe consulted Ray about the law of insanity, explaining that he believed law up to that point had mistakenly treated as legal questions what were properly considered questions of fact for the jury.

Doe died in office on March 9, 1896, at the train station in Rollinsford, New Hampshire.

== Influence and reputation ==
Roscoe Pound contended that Doe's greatest contribution to legal history was to show that legislative codification was not the only way of accomplishing legal reform:

Indeed, Doe's achievements in procedure are a striking testimony to what a masterful personality, joined with sound legal instincts and thorough knowledge of the traditional legal materials, may do in the way of practical law reform by judicial decision alone, without the aid of legislation.

John Henry Wigmore, the early 19th century jurist and preeminent scholar of the law of evidence, dedicated his Treatise on Evidence to Doe and to James Bradley Thayer, calling them the "Two Masters in the Law of Evidence".

Oliver Wendell Holmes Jr., the United States Supreme Court justice, did not share Wigmore's high regard for Doe. Writing to thank Wigmore in 1910 when the latter dedicated his Pocket Code of Evidence to Holmes, Holmes wrote,

I never quite understood your predilection for Doe. He seemed to me to write longwinded rather second rate discourses... at all events I thought there was not a great deal of brandy in his water.

== Personality and character ==
Despite considerable wealth, Doe dressed plainly, in the manner of a country farmer, wearing a brown frock coat and unpolished boots. Impatient with court formalities, he did not open or adjourn court with any ceremony, but rather called a recess at the end of the day until the next morning. He was known to keep the windows of his courtroom open during the winter, supplying the jury with horse blankets to keep warm. Doe's biographer, John Phillip Reid, asserts that Doe

was a man of genius, but his genius was displayed only professionally. He did not possess the curiosity that marks the educated man. He read only one novel in his life and seems to have been unaware of the movements in literature which were taking place in his century. He was an astute historian, but not a student of history. He read history only when it bore on a legal problem which he was researching. Indeed, he was not in the habit of reading unless it served a pragmatic purpose.

In 2007, the New Hampshire Supreme Court was given Doe's personal library, which had been "rescued" from a barn in Rollinsford, New Hampshire. Consisting of 1,764 items, the collection shed new light on Doe's thinking. His marginalia, one commentator observed, "provide evidence of his inclinations toward reform, his peeves, his interests, and show his humorous and poetic sides."

== See also ==
- New Hampshire Historical Marker No. 88: Charles Cogswell Doe (1830–1896)

== Sources ==
- Cohen, Jay (1984). "Charles Cogswell Doe". In Simpson, A. W. B. (ed.). Biographical Dictionary of the Common Law. Butterworths. pp. 153–154. ISBN 0-406-51657-X.
- Reid, John Phillip (2009). "Charles Cogswell Doe". In Newman, Roger K. (ed.). The Yale Biographical Dictionary of American Law. Yale University Press. pp. 168–169. ISBN 978-0-30011300-6.
- Reid, John Phillip (1967). Chief Justice: The Judicial World of Charles Doe. Harvard University Press. ISBN 978-0674114005.
- Reik, Louis E. (December 1953). "The Doe-Ray Correspondence: A Pioneer Collaboration in the Jurisprudence of Mental Disease". Yale Law Journal. 63 (2): 183–196. doi:10.2307/793465. JSTOR 793465.
- Reid, J. P. (1959–1960). "The Reformer and the Precisian: A Study in Judicial Attitudes". Journal of Legal Education. 12 (2): 157.
- Kenison, Frank R. (1956). "Pioneers in Criminology XII—Charles Doe (1830 - 1896)". Journal of Criminal Law and Criminology. 47 (3): 277–283. doi:10.2307/1140318. JSTOR 1140318.
- Popper, Robert (January 1962). "History and Development of the Accused's Right to Testify". Washington University Law Review. 1962 (4): 454.
- Douglas III, Charles G.; Surdukowski, Jay (Winter 2010). "The New Hampshire Supreme Court: A History of Change". New Hampshire Bar Journal: 10.
- Surdukowski, Jay. "Rollinsford Revisited: The Sacred and Profane Memories of Chief Justice Charles Doe". New Hampshire Bar Journal. Fall 2013–Winter 2014: 30.
- White, G. Edward (1976). The American Judicial Tradition: Profiles of Leading American Judges. Oxford University Press. ISBN 978-0195139631.
- "Note: Doe of New Hampshire: Reflections on a Nineteenth Century Judge". Harvard Law Review. 63: 513–522. 1950. doi:10.2307/1336250. JSTOR 1336250. – via HeinOnline (subscription required)
