= New Hampshire Bar Association =

Bar Association

- Type: Legal Society
- Headquarters: Concord, NH
- Location: United States
- Members: 5,885 in 2012 (2,167 out of state)
- Website: http://www.nhbar.org/

The New Hampshire Bar Association (NHBA) is the integrated (mandatory) bar association of the U.S. state of New Hampshire.

== History ==
NHBA's lineage extends back to county bar chapters such as New Hampshire's Grafton County Bar Association which in 1793 examined candidates for admission to the bar; a statewide meeting of New Hampshire bar members occurred in 1788.

In 1873, a special act of the Legislature established "The Bar Association of the State of New Hampshire" as a voluntary membership organization, making it the oldest statewide bar organization in the United States. Its first President was Ira Perley. In 1967, NHBA petitioned the Legislature to amend its acts of incorporation to change its name to "New Hampshire Bar Association". The next year, the New Hampshire Supreme Court unified the bar (making membership mandatory for practicing law in New Hampshire) for a three-year trial period. In 1972 Court ordered that unification "be continued without limitation of time".

== Structure ==
The NHBA is governed by a Board of Governors consisting of 6 officers elected statewide by the membership, 11 members elected by county, 5 elected at large, a public sector governor, and an ABA Association Delegate.

The Bar enforces the rule that New Hampshire lawyers must complete 12 credits of Continuing Legal Education each year.

NHBA publishes the scholarly quarterly New Hampshire Bar Journal and the newsier monthly New Hampshire Bar News.
