= List of people executed in New Hampshire =

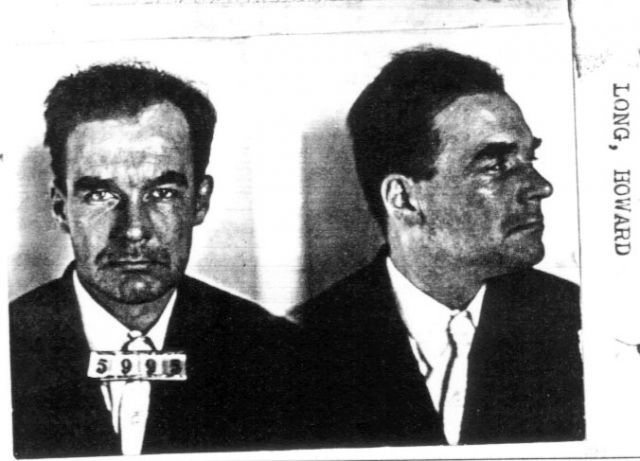
Howard Long, the most recent person executed in New Hampshire (1939, 87 years ago)

The following is a list of people executed in the U.S. state of New Hampshire. Between 1739 and 1939, during which New Hampshire was first the Province of New Hampshire and then became a U.S. state, 24 people were so punished. The sole method used was hanging.

Capital punishment in New Hampshire was abolished on May 30, 2019; however, the abolition was not retroactive and one inmate, Michael K. Addison, remains on the state's death row. Should the state carry out his execution, it would be by lethal injection, with hanging as an alternative should lethal injection be ruled unconstitutional or found inefficient, or if the inmate so requested.

== List ==
New Hampshire had public executions through 1868, which were held (after becoming a U.S. state) at county seats. Executions then moved to the state capital, Concord, held at the state prison.

Name	Race	Age	Sex	Date of execution	County	Crime	Victim(s)	Governor
Sarah Simpson	White	27	F	December 27, 1739	Rockingham	Murder	Her illegitimate daughter, newborn, white	Jonathan Belcher
Penelope Kenny	White	20	F	December 27, 1739	Rockingham	Murder	Her illegitimate child, newborn, white	Jonathan Belcher
Eliphaz Dow	White	50	M	May 8, 1755	Rockingham	Murder	Peter Clough, white	Benning Wentworth
Ruth Blay	White	31	F	December 30, 1768	Rockingham	Concealing childbirth	Her illegitimate child, newborn, white	John Wentworth
Elisha Thomas	White		M	June 3, 1788	Strafford	Murder	Capt. Peter Downe, white	John Sullivan
Thomas Powers	Mixed (Note: Mulatto.)	19	M	July 28, 1796	Grafton	Rape		John Taylor Gilman
Josiah Burnham	White	63	M	August 12, 1806	Grafton	Murder	Capt. Joseph Starkweather and Russell Freeman, white	John Langdon
Daniel Farmer	White	28	M	January 3, 1822	Hillsborough	Murder	Anna Ayers, white	Samuel Bell
Abraham Prescott	White	18	M	January 6, 1836	Merrimack	Murder-Rape	Sally Cochrane, white	William Badger
Andrew Howard	White		M	July 8, 1846	Strafford	Murder-Burglary	Phoebe Hanson, white	Anthony Colby
Rev. Enos Dudley	White		M	May 23, 1849	Grafton	Murder	Female, white (wife)	Jared W. Williams
Samuel Mills	White	28	M	May 6, 1868	Grafton	Murder-Robbery	George Maxwell, 65, white	Walter Harriman
Josiah Pike	White	31	M	November 9, 1869 (Note: First execution at the state prison.)	Rockingham	Murder-Burglary	Mr. and Mrs. Thomas Brown, elderly, white	Onslow Stearns
Franklin B. Evans	White	67	M	February 17, 1874	Rockingham	Murder-Rape	Georgianna Lovering, 14, white (niece) (Note: Suspected serial killer, confessed to another similar crime and suspected in three more for which he denied involvement.)	Ezekiel A. Straw
Elwin Major	White	29	M	January 5, 1877	Hillsborough	Murder	Ida Lovejoy Major, 17, white (wife)	Person Colby Cheney
Joseph LaPage	White	38	M	March 15, 1878	Merrimack	Murder-Rape	Josie Langmaid, 17, white (Note: Serial killer, murdered four women in Canada and the United States and attempted to murder two others, including his sister-in-law.)	Benjamin F. Prescott
John Pinkham	White	50	M	March 14, 1879	Strafford	Murder	Mrs. Berry, white	Benjamin F. Prescott
Joseph Buzzell	White	42	M	July 10, 1879	Carroll	Murder	Susan Hanson, white (ex-fiancée)	Nathaniel Head
Thomas Samon	White	36	M	April 17, 1885	Belknap	Murder	Three people, white (Note: His girlfriend Jane Ford, James Ruddy, and Ruddy's one-year-old son.)	Samuel W. Hale
James Palmer	White	21	M	May 1, 1890	Rockingham	Murder	Henry T. Whitehouse, white	David H. Goodell
Frank Almy	White	35	M	May 16, 1893	Grafton	Murder-Rape	Christie Warden, 25, white	John Butler Smith
Oscar Comery	White	34	M	February 18, 1916	Hillsborough	Murder	Female, white (wife)	Rolland H. Spaulding
Frederick L. Small	White	51	M	January 15, 1918	Carroll	Murder	Florence Arlene Small, 37, white (wife)	Henry W. Keyes
Howard Long	White	33	M	July 14, 1939	Merrimack	Murder	Mark Neville Jensen, 10, white (Note: Serial rapist, assaulted Jensen before murdering him and assaulted a boy and a girl in two separate crimes in Massachusetts.)	Francis P. Murphy

== See also ==
- Capital punishment in the United States
