= Oscar Comery =

American executed murderer

Oscar Joseph Comery (July 1886 – February 18, 1916) was a Canadian-American chauffeur hanged in Concord, New Hampshire for murdering his wife.

Comery was born in Canada, the son of French Canadians Joseph Comery (also spelled Comire) and Celine Boisvert.

According to the Concord Evening Monitor, Comery killed his wife on November 29, 1914. He was arrested on January 1, 1915, brought to trial on February 8, 1915, where he "pleaded guilty to murder in the first degree with the expectation that the court would sentence him to life imprisonment."

On February 18, 1916, Comery was convicted of murdering his wife. He confessed to killing his wife by poisoning her with strychnine by replacing the quinine his wife normally took with the poison. An autopsy was performed and strychnine was determined to be the cause of death.

He was hanged at 12:31 a.m. at the New Hampshire State Prison on February 18, 1916, at the age of 34. Comery was the first of only three people executed by the state of New Hampshire in the 20th century. The other two were Frederick L. Small in 1918 and Howard Long in 1939.

== See also ==
- Capital punishment in New Hampshire
- Capital punishment in the United States
- List of people executed in New Hampshire
- List of people executed in the United States in 1916

Preceded by Frank Almy	Executions carried out in New Hampshire	Succeeded by Frederick L. Small
