= Execution warrant =

Authorization to execute a condemned person

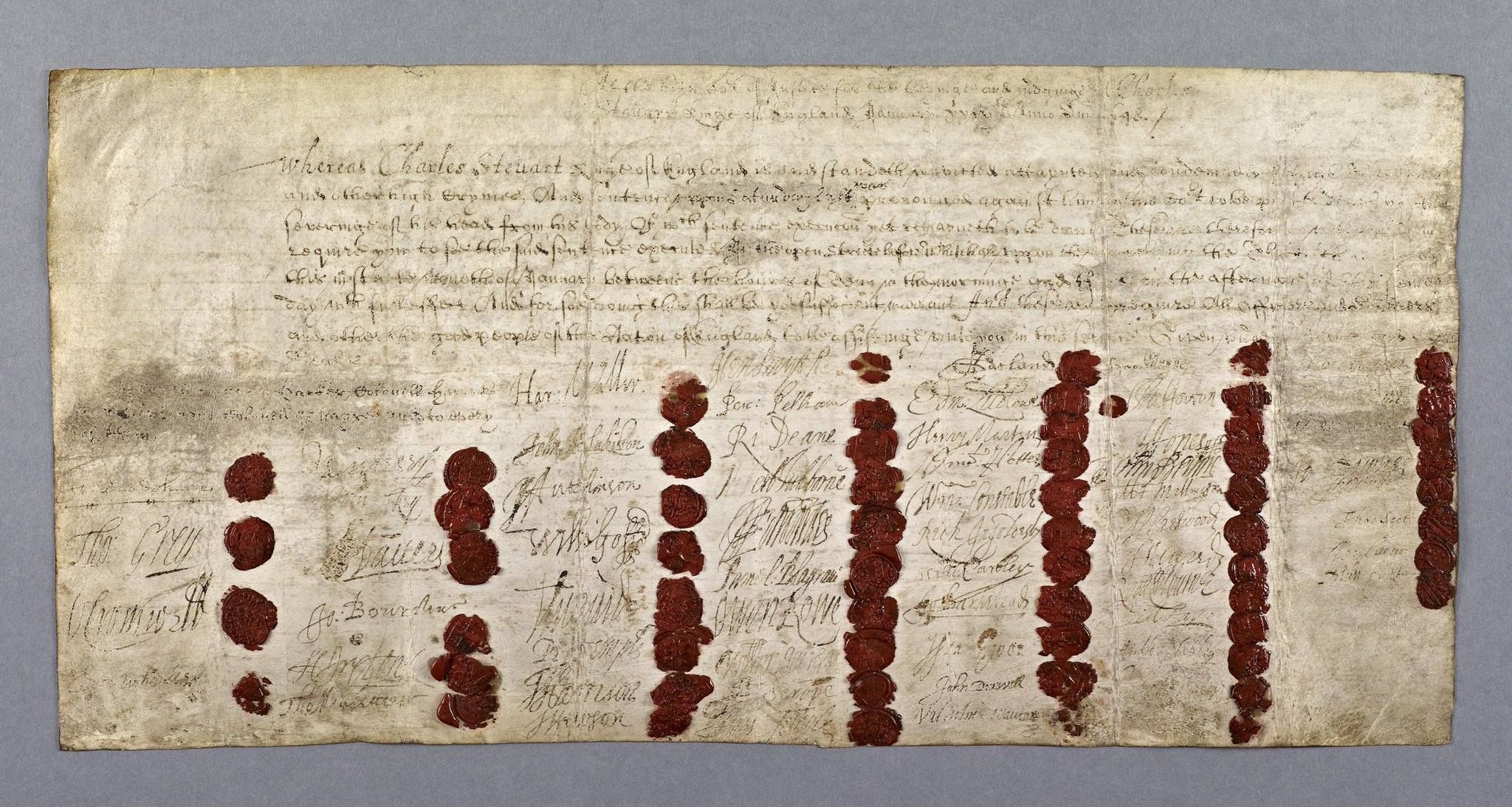
The death warrant (1649) of King Charles I of England and the wax seals of the 59 commissioners (Note: In 2011 the death warrant for Charles I was added by UNESCO to the UK Memory of the World Register (UKP: Warrant; UNESCO: Register))

An execution warrant (also called a death warrant or a black warrant) is a writ that authorizes the execution of a condemned person.

== United States ==
In the United States, either a judicial or executive official designated by law issues an execution warrant. This is done when a person, in trial court proceedings, has been sentenced to death, after trial and conviction, and usually after appeals are exhausted. Normally when a death warrant is signed and an execution date is set, the condemned person is moved from his or her death row cell to a death watch cell, which is typically located adjacent to the execution chamber. Usually, the government agency tasked with carrying out the execution, normally the state's Department of Corrections or the Federal Bureau of Prisons in federal cases, has a limited time frame, normally about 60 days, from the date the warrant is signed, to complete the execution process, or the warrant expires and the condemned person is returned to the death row cell, awaiting another execution date.

Stays of execution can be ordered in state cases by the Governor of the State, a trial court, a state appeals court or state Supreme Court or a court in the federal judiciary (including the United States Supreme Court). In federal death penalty cases the trial court, appeals courts, the United States Supreme Court and President may grant a stay of execution. In all cases, the stay may be issued at any time, even when the condemned is being prepared for execution.

=== Setting of execution dates by jurisdiction ===
Jurisdiction	Power	Notes
Federal	Director of the Federal Bureau of Prisons	Except to the extent a court orders otherwise, a sentence of death shall be executed on a date and at a time designated by the Director of the Federal Bureau of Prisons, which date shall be no sooner than 60 days from the entry of the judgment of death. If the date designated for execution passes by reason of a stay of execution, then a new date shall be designated promptly by the Director of the Federal Bureau of Prisons when the stay is lifted.
Federal (Military)	Secretary of the Army	According to Army Regulation (AR) 190-55, the Secretary of the Army, as the designated Department of Defense Corrections Level III executive official and upon the recommendation of the provost marshal general, sets the date, time, location and method of military executions. The execution date must be at least 60 days after affirmation of the sentence by the President of the United States. All sentences of death must be personally affirmed, in writing, by the President of the United States before the Secretary of the Army is permitted to authorize an execution.
Alabama	Alabama Supreme Court	The sentence shall be executed at any hour on the day set for the execution, not less than 30 nor more than 100 days from the date of sentencing.
Arizona	Arizona Supreme Court	
Arkansas	Governor	
California	Trial Court Judge	The execution date shall not be less than 60 days nor more than 90 days from the time of making the order
Colorado	Trial Court Judge	The death penalty in Colorado was repealed in 2020.
Connecticut	Trial Court Judge	Connecticut's death penalty was repealed April 25, 2012 for all future trials. The Connecticut Supreme Court commuted the sentences of all remaining death row inmates to life without parole on August 13, 2015.
Delaware	Trial Court Judge	Delaware's death penalty statute was found unconstitutional in 2016.
Florida	Governor	After a stay of execution is dissolved, the Governor must set the new date for execution of the death sentence within 10 days. The Governor can grant stays. If a death sentence is not carried out because of unjustified failure of the Governor to issue a warrant, or for any other unjustifiable reason, on application of the Department of Legal Affairs, the Supreme Court shall issue a warrant directing the sentence to be executed during a week designated in the warrant.
Georgia	Trial Court Judge	The court shall specify the time period for the execution in the sentence. The time period for the execution fixed by the court shall be seven days in duration and shall commence at noon on a specified date and shall end at noon on a specified date. The time period shall commence not less than 20 days nor more than 60 days from the date of sentencing. A new time period for the execution -due to stay- fixed by the judge shall commence not less than ten nor more than 20 days from the date of the order.
Idaho	Trial Court Judge	
Illinois	Supreme Court of Illinois	The death penalty in Illinois was repealed in 2011.
Indiana	Indiana Supreme Court	
Kansas		No executions have occurred in Kansas since 1965.
Kentucky	Governor	The execution shall in theory be carried out on the fifth Friday following the affirmation of the sentence by the Kentucky Supreme Court. However, if the sentence is not carried out because of stays or any other cause, the governor may appoint another day of execution and may continue to do so until the sentence is carried into effect.
Louisiana	Trial Court Judge	
Maryland	Trial Court Judge	Maryland's death penalty was repealed May 2, 2013 for all future trials. The governor commuted the sentences of the four remaining members of death row to life without parole on December 31, 2014.
Massachusetts	Trial Court Judge	Massachusetts' death penalty statute was found unconstitutional in 1984.
Mississippi	Supreme Court of Mississippi	
Missouri	Supreme Court of Missouri	
Montana	Trial Court Judge	
Nebraska	Nebraska Supreme Court	
Nevada	Trial Court Judge	
New Hampshire	Governor	The governor and council or their designee shall determine the time of performing such execution. Death penalty abolished in 2019, but not retroactively. New Hampshire still has one individual, Michael K. Addison, on death row.
New Mexico	Trial Court Judge	When judgment of death is rendered by any court of competent jurisdiction a warrant signed by the judge and attested by the clerk under the seal of the court must be drawn and delivered to the sheriff. It must state the conviction and judgment and appoint a day on which the judgment is to be executed, which must be not less than sixty nor more than ninety days from the date of judgment and must direct the sheriff to deliver the defendant, at a time specified in said order, not more than ten days from the date of judgment, to the warden of the state penitentiary at Santa Fe for execution. Death penalty abolished in 2009, but not retroactively. New Mexico had 2 individuals on death row, however their sentences were struck down by the New Mexico Supreme Court in 2019.
New York	Trial Court Judge	The death penalty in New York was de facto repealed in 2007. The week of execution appointed in the warrant shall be not less than 30 days and not more than 60 days after the issuance of the warrant. The date of execution within said week shall be left to the discretion of the commissioner, but the date and hour of the execution shall be announced publicly no later than seven days prior to said execution.
North Carolina	The Secretary of Public Safety	The Secretary of Public Safety with the assistance of the commissioner of the Adult Correction Division and the Director of Prisons shall immediately schedule the execution date for a condemned prisoner pursuant to the original death sentence no less than 15 days nor more than 120 days from the date of receiving written notification from the Office of the Attorney General in accordance with current statutory provisions
Ohio	Supreme Court of Ohio	
Oklahoma	Oklahoma Court of Criminal Appeals	Okla. Code of Criminal Procedures. 22-1001
Oregon	Trial Court Judge	
Pennsylvania	Governor	List of execution Warrants Issued since 1985 At least 349 execution warrants were signed since 1985, but only three executions were carried out, because those three defendants waived appeals.
South Carolina	South Carolina Supreme Court	
South Dakota	Trial Court Judge	
Tennessee	Tennessee Supreme Court	
Texas	Trial Court Judge	The first execution date may not be earlier than the 91st day after the date the convicting court enters the order setting the execution date. A subsequent execution date may not be earlier than the 31st day after the date the convicting court enters the order setting the execution date. The execution date shall be a Tuesday, Wednesday or Thursday.
Utah	Trial Court Judge	The appointed day the judgment is to be executed, which may not be fewer than 30 days nor more than 60 days from the date of issuance of the warrant, and may not be a Sunday, Monday, or a legal holiday.
Virginia	Trial Court Judge	The death penalty in Virginia was repealed in 2021.
Washington	Trial Court Judge	Washington's death penalty statute was found unconstitutional in 2018.
Wyoming	Trial Court Judge	

== United Kingdom ==
Mary, Queen of Scots, whose death warrant was signed by Elizabeth I, and King Charles I were among the most famous victims of death warrants in British history.

== See also ==
- Bill of attainder (capital or other punishment of a specific person authorized by a legislature rather than a court)
- Fatwa (in the western usage of the term to mean a religious warrant to kill)
