= Frank Almy =

American criminal (1857–1893)

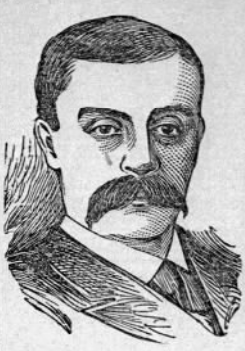
- Born: George H. Abbott; June 5, 1857; Salem, Massachusetts, U.S.
- Died: May 16, 1893 (aged 35); New Hampshire State Prison, Concord, New Hampshire, U.S.
- Cause of death: Execution by hanging
- Conviction: First degree murder
- Penalty: Death

Details
- Victims: Christie Warden
- Date: July 17, 1891
- Weapon: Handgun
- Date apprehended: August 20, 1891

Frank C. Almy (born George H. Abbott, June 5, 1857 – May 16, 1893) was an American convicted murderer hanged by the state of New Hampshire for killing a woman in Hanover, New Hampshire, in July 1891.

== Background ==
George Abbott was born in 1857 in Salem, Massachusetts, and moved with his foster parents to North Thetford, Vermont, at age 10. At age 17, in 1874, he was sentenced to four years in New Hampshire prison for a burglary in Orford, New Hampshire. After his release in 1878, he returned to his hometown of Salem, but by 1879 was back in the Connecticut River area of Vermont and New Hampshire, where he was involved in more burglaries. He was eventually caught, and sentenced to 15 years in prison in Vermont, entering in June 1881, aged 23. He escaped from prison in September 1887, and thereafter went by the name Frank C. Almy.

During 1889 and 1890, Almy worked in Massachusetts in Peabody, Lynn, Marblehead, and Danvers. By July 1890, he had relocated to Hanover, New Hampshire, and took a job on the farm of the Warden family there. He left in April 1891, returned to his hometown of Salem, then took a job in the Dorchester neighborhood of Boston.

== Crime ==
On July 17, 1891, Almy confronted four women near Hanover. He singled out Christie Warden, aged 25, and dragged her away, while using a handgun to threaten the other women, including Warden's mother and her younger sister. After dragging Warden away, he killed her with two gunshots and removed most of her clothing. Almy had previously worked for Warden's father, and she had reportedly rejected his attention. (Note: Later reports suggest attraction between the two, although Christie's younger sister had developed a dislike of Almy.) Almy then disappeared, leading to a large manhunt.

== Apprehension ==
On July 21, Almy was thought to be in Canada, believed to have boarded a train in Sherbrooke, Quebec, bound for Richmond, Quebec. He was then suspected of having boarded a ship bound for England. On July 29, a man detained in Montpelier, Vermont, on suspicion of being Almy, was found not to be him. Eventually, Almy was captured on August 20 in Hanover, having hid himself in the barn of the Warden family for 33 days. After being discovered in the barn, Almy exchanged gunfire with his pursuers, and ultimately surrendered after being shot in the leg and becoming weak due to the loss of blood. His capture garnered a six-column story on the front page of The Boston Globe.

Newspaper reports that Almy was actually Abbott surfaced within days of his arrest. (Note: He was sentenced and executed under the name of Frank C. Almy by the state of New Hampshire.)

== Legal proceedings ==
On September 16, Almy was indicted by a grand jury for the murder of Christie Warden. On November 16, the day before his trial was set to begin, Almy was brought to court in Plymouth, New Hampshire, where he changed his plea from not guilty to guilty. Three days later, he was sentenced to death by hanging by the Supreme Court of Grafton County, the sentence to be carried out in December 1892. Motions by Almy's defense led to another court hearing in May 1892, at which time he was again sentenced to death by hanging, with the sentence to be carried out in May 1893.

On May 16, 1893, Almy was executed by hanging in Concord, New Hampshire. He was the last person executed by the state of New Hampshire during the 19th century.

== See also ==
- Capital punishment in New Hampshire
- Capital punishment in the United States
- List of people executed in New Hampshire

== Notes ==
Preceded by James Palmer	Executions carried out in New Hampshire	Succeeded by Oscar Comery
