= Joseph LaPage =

Canadian serial killer

- Born: Joseph Paget; 1838; Lower Canada
- Died: March 15, 1878 (aged 39–40); New Hampshire State Prison, Concord, New Hampshire, United States
- Cause of death: Execution by hanging
- Other names: "The French Monster"; Joseph La Pagette; Joseph Paige; Joseph Par(r)ish; Joseph Paize; Joseph Le Paize
- Conviction: First degree murder
- Penalty: Death

Details
- Victims: 4
- Span of crimes: 1867–1875
- Country: Canada, United States
- States: Quebec, Vermont, New Hampshire
- Date apprehended: October 14, 1875

Joseph LaPage (born Joseph Paget; 1838 – March 15, 1878), known as "The French Monster" and various other aliases, was a Canadian rapist, serial killer and necrophile who murdered four women in Canada and the United States, also attempting to kill his wife's sister and another unnamed woman. He was hanged for the murder of 17-year-old Josie Langmaid, which occurred in Pembroke, New Hampshire.

== Biography ==
=== Life and early crimes ===
LaPage was born as Joseph Paget in 1838, in an unnamed settlement 50 miles (80 km) northwest of Montreal. His parents, who were immigrants from France, were well-respected farmers in the area. When he was about 20 years old, LaPage married a woman three years older than him, with whom he had five children. Five years after their marriage, the family moved to Sainte-Béatrix, where he had already received a negative reputation. He frequently abused his wife and his eldest daughter; he even went so far as nearly killing his wife's sister, Julienne Rousse (who survived and testified as his later trial). LaPage was arrested, but knocked the officer down and fled to the United States. He took his family with him, and settled in St. Albans, Vermont, in September 1871. The following year, he briefly returned to his former residence, where he was suspected of setting on fire the home of a man connected to his arrest, and also attempting to assault a young unmarried woman. He struck the woman with a club, causing her injuries that would last for a month. LaPage also attempted to entice a 14-year-old girl into the woods with him, but failed. Soon after, he returned to St. Albans, where he occasionally worked as a farmhand and woodsman.

=== Murder of Mariette Ball ===
On July 24, 1874, Mariette N. Ball, a school teacher in St. Albans' nearby district, was murdered. Her daily trips from her home to work passed by a field in which LaPage worked, and he became fascinated by her. After many weeks of contemplation, on July 24, 1874, he decided to follow her. He gave an excuse that he was going to pick berries, and then cut through the woods and waited at a hill. Ball was walking through the desolate path, en route to the residence of Foster A. Page, which she did every Saturday. LaPage, who had put on a roughly made mask made from an old mat, attacked Ball, who pleaded for her life and fought back. During the struggle, she managed to tear away the mask and see LaPage's face. Despite her strong physique and the several scratches inflicted on the man's face, she was strangled to death by LaPage, who then had sex with her corpse. After he was finished, just to make sure that she wouldn't return to life, he bashed her head into a stone. The bloodied murderer then left the scene.

Ball's body was soon found, and an investigation was launched to determine who had killed her. At one time, LaPage was arrested for the crime thanks to George M. Lang, who had been inquired about the departure of a train by LaPage, who had scratches on his face. He was brought before Sheriffs Newton and Swift, who inquired about the murder, but as they had no evidence and the hired detective from Boston had also seen other people in the district at the time of the murder, LaPage was released and others were investigated. In the end, nobody was convicted of the murder, and the Ball family moved to California.

=== Murder of Josie Langmaid ===
After the Ball murder, LaPage moved to Suncook, New Hampshire, where he was hired by Mr. Trueworthy L. Fowler to work as a substitute tender in Pembroke. While working there, he noticed a beautiful young girl and her classmate (Langmaid), and inquired of Fowler's son about who the girl was. The son told him it was his sister, and LaPage continued to ask where she had come from and if she passed through the old road, to which the brother replied positively.

Learning of this, LaPage then proceeded to wait for the girl out in the woods near Pembroke on October 4, 1875, but as she did not appear, he instead focused his attention on another target: 17-year-old Josie Langmaid. She had just left her father's house and was walking towards school when she turned towards the old road. When seen by LaPage, he immediately attacked her. A severe struggle ensued, with LaPage tearing through the girl's clothes, raping her before beginning to hit her with a stick, before taking out his knife and cutting Josie's throat so deeply that he began decapitating her. After she had died, he took her body to the nearby woods, where he fully decapitated her and then brought her head to another spot along the road, before leaving to wash his hands, coat and knife in a nearby brook. Leaving the body there, he returned to the place where he had left his axe, and a little further ahead he hid the wallet, ring and other items he had stolen from the girl. Soon after, he returned to his home in Suncook, where he then burned his clothes. When inquired by his wife about the scratches on his neck, he claimed that they were caused by poison ivy.

== Discovery and arrest ==
Langmaid's body was soon found in the woods, and authorities immediately began searching for the perpetrator. Initially suspicions fell on a local named Bill Drew, who was nearly lynched by an outraged mob. However, Mr. Fowler's son remembered his conversation with LaPage, and immediately he was sought after. Meanwhile, a Mr. W. N. Abell, with whom Mariette Ball had boarded in St. Albans, read about the Langmaid murder, and knowing that LaPage had moved away to Suncook last summer. He contacted the authorities in Suncook and gave the suspected murderer's name, and since they knew that LaPage's children worked in the nearby factory, they asked his employer about the location of the man's residence. When they went there, Mr. Fowler immediately recognized the man who worked with him, and LaPage was immediately arrested.

== Trial, sentence and death ==
At his initial trial, LaPage was convicted and sentenced to death, but as he complained that it was unfair towards him, he was ordered to have a second trial, in which he was convicted again. He was put in an isolated cell, where he was noted as repeating prayers, pacing around, and looking gloomily out the window. He was visited several times by reporters and religious figures, and confessed the murders of both Langmaid and Ball to them, saying: "I kill gal. Yes, I kill two gal. Too bad, too bad." LaPage couldn't read either English or French, and instead had a calendar with a mark indicating March 15, the date of his execution.

When the day of his execution came, Sheriff Dodge and his deputies brought him to the scaffold. He was accompanied by Fathers Barret and Millett, repeating their prayers slowly in French. Despite his predicament, LaPage was reported as being very calm. After his death warrant was read, Sheriff Dodge remarked in a husky tone: "And now Joseph LaPage, in accordance with the command, I proceed to execute the sentence of death, by hanging you by the neck until you are dead, and may God have mercy on your soul."

After finishing, he pressed the button and the trap door opened. LaPage dropped about six feet, and died slowly, without a kick or convulsion. His body, on request by his wife, was then buried in the cemetery of Suncook's Catholic church.

== Discovery of earlier murders ==
In less than a month after LaPage's execution, a tip came from Saint-Alexandre, Quebec, that he most likely had murdered a mother and daughter there.

According to George Fountie, his wife and 16-year-old daughter Minnie had been murdered by LaPage on October 12, 1867. The pair had gone to the village, about two and a half miles away from their home, for trading purposes. After the wife met a fellow lady friend, they had dinner at her house and stayed there until half past six, but never returned home that night. On the dawn of the new day, Mr. Fountie, anxious that something horrible had happened, immediately began looking for them, assisted by the community. Following a long, exhaustive search, the mutilated bodies of both women were located under a brush pile off the main road, in a nearby pasture. Minnie, like Josie Langmaid, had been raped and her body mutilated, with the exception that her head hadn't been decapitated. A scamp by the name of Horace H. Martin was arrested, but soon released due to lack of evidence and the fact that he wasn't even near the area when the murders occurred.

However, Joseph LaPage was in the village at the time, doing business in the local post office. He was standing in the office doorway when the women passed by him on their way home. He followed them, and as they turned a corner in the street, he began speaking to them in an insulting way, which was resented by the mother and daughter. They said that if he didn't mind his own business, they would have him arrested, and LaPage soon went back to the post office, with neither party aware that the entire conversation was overheard by a man who had passed by. When he returned to the post office, LaPage said in an irritated tone that "if the women did have him 'hauled up' they would be sorry some time." He then left and crossed a field toward the north side of the village, which had a path leading directly to where the bodies were found. LaPage was never suspected of the murders at the time, but when he confessed to the Ball murder, Fountie was thoroughly convinced that he was the perpetrator. He claimed that if the murderer was alive, he would be convicted without much trouble, but also said that it didn't matter now, only showing the world at large the dangerous character of the man who had died on the scaffold.

== See also ==
- Capital punishment in New Hampshire
- Capital punishment in the United States
- List of people executed in New Hampshire
- List of serial killers by country
