= Frederick L. Small =

American criminal (b. 1866, d. 1918)

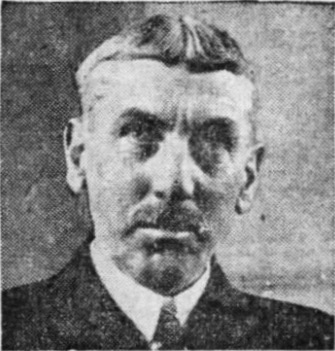
- Born: 1866; Portland, Maine, U.S.
- Died: January 15, 1918 (aged 51/52); New Hampshire State Prison, Concord, New Hampshire, U.S.
- Cause of death: Execution by hanging
- Conviction: First degree murder
- Penalty: Death

Details
- Victims: Florence Small (wife)
- Date: September 28, 1916
- Weapons: Window cord and handgun
- Date apprehended: September 29, 1916

Florence Small
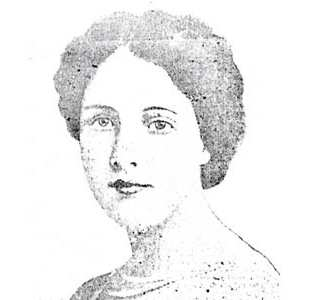
- Born: Florence Arlene Curry; March 15, 1879; Hortonville, Nova Scotia, Canada
- Died: September 28, 1916 (aged 37); Ossipee, New Hampshire, U.S.

Frederick Lincoln Small (1866 – January 15, 1918) was an American stockbroker, convicted and hanged by the U.S. state of New Hampshire for the murder of Florence Arlene Small (née Curry), his third wife.

== Background ==
Small was married three times. His first wife, Nettie Davis of Minot, Maine, died during childbirth on March 14, 1891. She was 22 years old.

In 1909, Small sued Arthur Soden, former president/owner of the Boston Beaneaters baseball team of the National League, for $500,000 ($17.9 million in 2025). Small claimed that Soden had "alienated the affections" of Small's second wife, Laura Patterson. At the time the damage amount of the lawsuit requested was the largest in United States history. In 1911, Soden was ordered to pay Small a judgment of $10,000 ($345,536 in 2025).

Around 1893, Mr. Small was employed in Boston as a real estate agent, he also was a stockbroker. He was moderately successful in both ventures.

Small and his third wife took out a joint life insurance policy of $20,000 ($591,743 in 2025) on March 16, 1916, from the John Hancock Company of Boston. The policy was written that the other spouse would collect if one spouse died. Mr. Small was 49 and Mrs. Small was 37 years old. One premium of $1,107.60 was paid before the incident. Mr. Small had two properties previously destroyed by mysterious fires before the one that claimed the life of his third wife, Florence.

== Crime ==
Mrs. Small's body was found in the ruins of the couple's burnt two-story cottage in Ossipee, New Hampshire, near Ossipee Lake following a fire that occurred during the evening of September 28, 1916. Mr. Small had been at the cottage that afternoon, but had left to travel to Boston via train. The fire was discovered about 10 p.m., and responders found a body in the debris the next morning. Mrs. Small's skull was crushed and also had a cord wrapped around her neck. She had also been shot, and there was evidence she had been chloroformed. The body would likely have been destroyed by the fire; however, fire had compromised the floor of the cottage, and her body was found in the flooded basement.

At first, the alibi of being in Boston was a good one for Mr. Small, until investigators discovered an alarm clock, spark plug, fire screen, clock spring and some hairpins had been used to make a timing device, indicating arson. Mr. Small was known to be a tinkerer who enjoyed mechanical projects. A local grocer reported that he delivered five gallons of kerosene to the Smalls' cottage just before the fire.

Small was standing outside the remains of the cottage when the medical examiner asked what he wanted done with his wife's remains. All he said "What?, is there enough left of the body for a casket?" He later put down about $30 for the cheapest one he could find. This raised suspicion of Small's involvement.

Mr. Small offered a $1,000 reward for information leading to the murderer after he was taken into custody. The authorities were already making a case against him by that time.

== Aftermath ==
Small went on trial at the newly built Carroll County Court House. At the time, the trial was very sensational. Many reporters from Boston covered the trial and there were quite a few spectators. On January 8, 1917, a jury found Frederick Small guilty of murder.

The State of New Hampshire executed Small by hanging on January 15, 1918. Small was the second of only three people executed by the state of New Hampshire in the 20th century. The other two were Oscar Comery in 1916 and Howard Long in 1939.

== Gallery ==
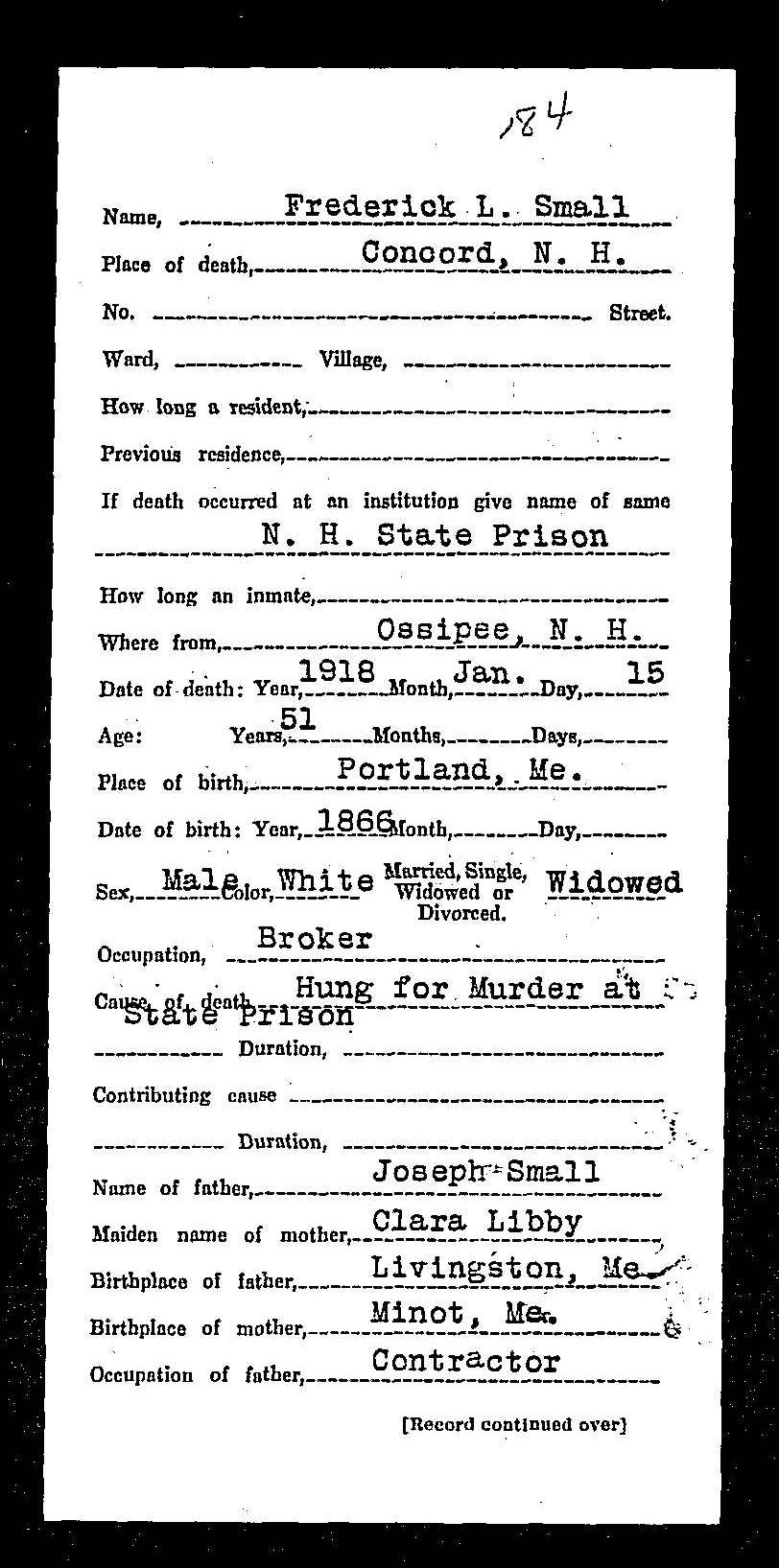
Mr. Small's death certificate

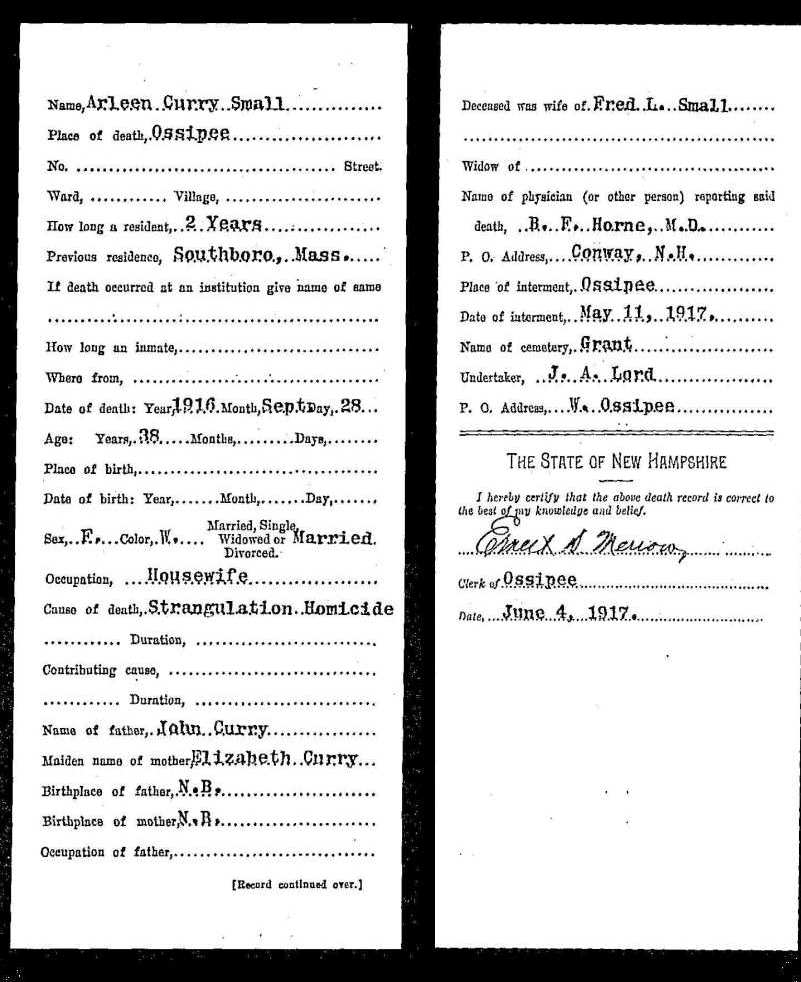
Mrs. Small's death certificate

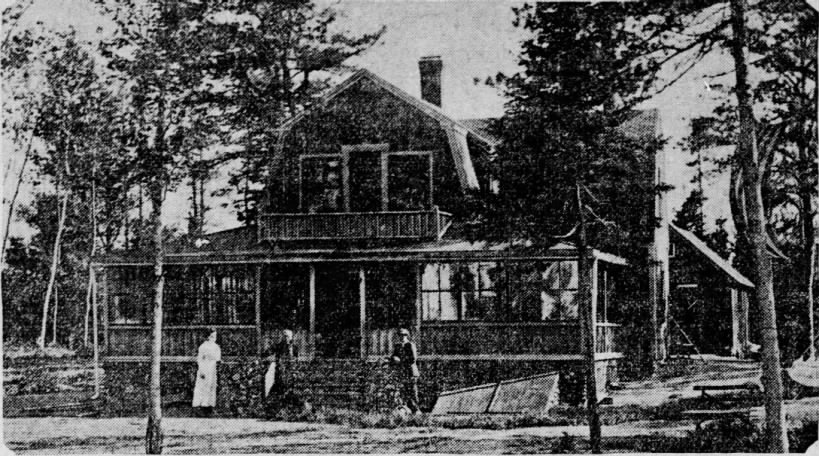
The couple's home, prior to the fire

== See also ==
- Capital punishment in New Hampshire
- Capital punishment in the United States
- List of people executed in New Hampshire
- List of people executed in the United States in 1918

Preceded by Oscar Comery	Executions carried out in New Hampshire	Succeeded by Howard Long
