= Franklin B. Evans =

Executed American murderer and suspected serial killer (1807–1874)

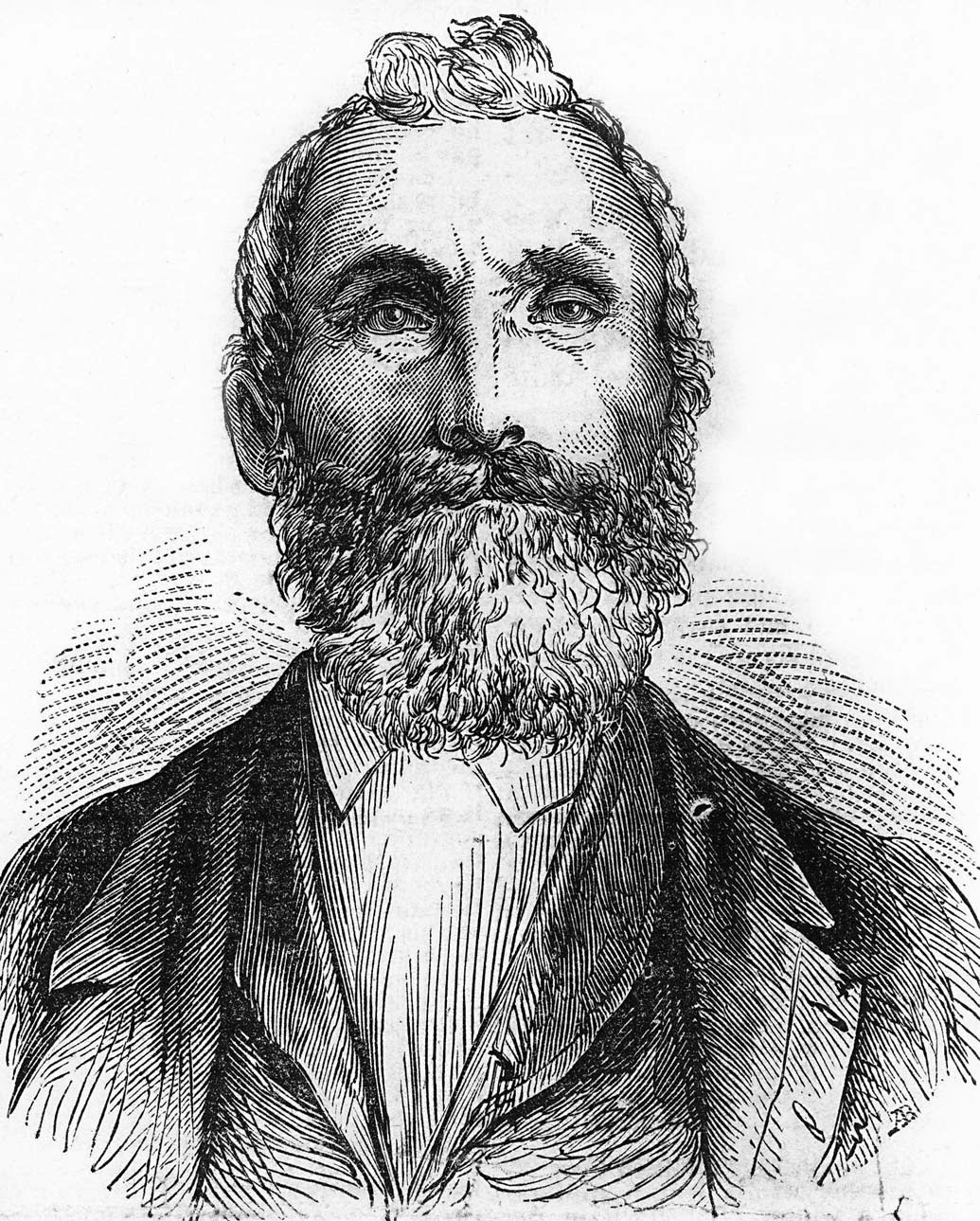
- Sketch of Evans circa 1870s
- Born: 1807; Strafford, New Hampshire, U.S.
- Died: February 17, 1874 (aged 66–67); New Hampshire State Prison, Concord, New Hampshire, U.S.
- Cause of death: Execution by hanging
- Other name: The Northwood Murderer
- Conviction: First degree murder
- Penalty: Death

Details
- Victims: 2–5+
- Span of crimes: 1850–1872
- Country: United States
- States: New Hampshire, possibly Maine and Massachusetts
- Date apprehended: 1872

Franklin B. Evans (1807 – February 17, 1874), known as The Northwood Murderer, was a 19th-century American murderer and suspected serial killer. He was convicted for the brutal murder of his niece Georgianna Lovering in Northwood, New Hampshire, in 1872, and later confessed to another similar murder in the town of Derry, committed in 1850. He was suspected in at least three other child murders in Maine and Massachusetts, but denied responsibility for them. He was executed at the New Hampshire State Prison for Men in 1874.

== Early life ==
Evans was born in 1807 in Strafford, New Hampshire, but since his youth led an itinerant lifestyle and travelled around the state; throughout his adult life, he lived in several New Hampshire towns (including Manchester, Concord, Allenstown, Derry, and Candia). He was married three times and fostered two children. Regarded as a shrewd individual by locals, Evans was known for his eccentric but harmless behavior. He presented himself as a botanist, magician and even a Millerite preacher, travelling extensively around New England and even farther north into Canada. He was quickly exposed as a fraud wherever he went, however, and in 1872 he wound up boarding at the house of Sylvester Day in Northwood. Day was the brother of Evans's first wife. Evans was predominantly friendly with the majority of Day's family members, and made his income as a laborer for local farmers.

== Murder of Georgianna Lovering ==
The 14-year-old Georgianna Lovering, affectionately known as "Georgie" among her family members, was Evans' niece, and they lived together in the same household. Although Lovering wasn't especially fond of her uncle she still respected and even looked up to him, as he was her older relative. At one point, it was claimed that Evans had attempted to seduce her, but that she rejected him and told her mother about the incident. After that, Evans began to treat her much more nicely, but was planning to have his way with her in the long run. Evans began setting snares to catch birds out in the nearby forest, and told his niece about all of the pretty colors of the magnificent creatures he'd captured. Naturally curious, Lovering started asking him to bring her along to see them. At first Evans refused, but he eventually allowed her to on several occasions. On September 24, 1872, Evans asked Lovering to go and look after his birds, as he had to go to work. Initially hesitant as she had grown tired of doing it, Lovering accepted and went to the forest. On the following day she was asked to do it again, and she once more reluctantly accepted. Before leaving, Lovering told her grandmother that she would be in the forest looking after Evans's birds, and would return later. She then kissed her and left. After that, she would never be seen alive again.

Unbeknownst to Lovering, Evans, who was hiding on a hillside overlooking the Day household and the nearby pasture, was lying in wait for her. When he saw her going into the woods, he followed after her. At some point, Evans attacked and raped Lovering, who fiercely attempted to resist him and escape. To prevent her from doing so, Evans wrapped his hands around her throat and strangled her to death. After assuring she was dead, he took out a knife and proceeded to extensively mutilate parts of her body. Fearing that she might be discovered if left here, Evans dragged her body to the swamp, where he discarded it in a hollow filled with rocks and other debris and covered it with leaves. After concealing the body, he promptly left the area.

=== Search, arrest and discovery ===
When she failed to return home by the usual time, Lovering's grandmother asked Day to go out into the woods and get her. He followed the trail where she was last seen, but found no trace of her. As he got deeper and deeper into the forest, Day kept calling out for Lovering, thinking that she was simply playing a prank on him and was hiding behind a tree. Eventually, he grew tired and returned home, expecting that she had returned home by now via another path. However, much to both Day's and the grandmother's shock, she was nowhere to be found. A search party was organized by the neighbors, and they all went looking for her in the woods. Not long after, while passing by a brush fence near the entry to the forest, a neighbor, James Pender, found a broken comb which belonged to Lovering. Alarmed by the discovery, the party ventured further along the trail, where they found the missing girl's apron. Not long after, some misplaced leaves, stirred up dirt and footprints were located, all of which indicated that there had been a struggle. By this time, a fear arose among the Northwood residents that Lovering had been murdered.

By this time, Evans had run some errands and returned home via a path in the forest. In the evening, he was visited by John G. Mead, a merchant who usually made transactions for Lovering and who inquired of him about the missing girl. Evans emphatically insisted on his innocence, but his apparent lack of anxiety made Mead suspicious. He informed the police, who kept a close watch on Evans' home until they could obtain an arrest warrant. To their surprise, Evans made no attempt to escape, and was shortly thereafter arrested by Sheriff Henry A. Drew, who drove him to his house in Strafford. There, Evans continued to deny that he had done anything and claimed that Lovering was alive and well, but at the same time he also begged the Sheriff to provide him with some strychnine, likely with which to commit suicide. In the meantime, the search party was combing through the entire forest, but was unsuccessful in finding Lovering.

A few days after being detained, Evans told Sheriff Drew that he had met a man by the name of Webster in Strafford. He claimed that the stranger had come from Kingston and expressed his desire to elope with Lovering. Evans agreed to assist him, and on the agreed day, he gave the girl $11 to buy some new clothes and took her to the forest, where she and the mysterious man then drove away. Despite his suspicions that this was a fabricated story, Drew took Evans to Kingston in search of Webster, but found that there was no such man living there. Evans shrugged this off and said that he might've been from Kensington, but that search also turned up fruitless. By this point tired of Evans' lies, Drew brought him back to the house, where he began to repeatedly ask him questions regarding Lovering because he was certain that the man was hiding something. Eventually, Evans buckled under the pressure and confessed that he had done something terrible, confessing in detail what he had done to the girl. In order to get him to reveal the body's location, Drew promised Evans that if he did so, he would help him escape into Canada and even divide the prize money between them. Evans, evidently fooled by the proposal, agreed, unaware that the sheriff later informed his wife to tell some of the nearby neighbors to be on standby to apprehend the killer if he tried to escape.

After gathering their search party, the group went to the outskirts of the forest, whereupon Evans and Drew, armed with a lantern, went inside. After traversing through the pitch-black marshes and getting lost once, Evans eventually stopped at a deep hollow in the swamp, pointing out to a spot covered with leaves. Drew approached the spot and upon touching it, he realised that it was indeed the dead girl's body. He then took out his handcuffs and arrested Evans, who pleaded that the officer shoot him on the spot. Drew refused, and called for assistance. One of the men, E. J. Parshley, was left to guard the prisoner, while the others fetched more officers and a surgeon. Two hours later they returned, and the surgeon, Dr. Hanson, lifted the body from its resting place. He observed bruising around the girl's neck, indicating strangulation. As he began to cut through her clothing, the grisly sight of her mutilated body was revealed to the onlookers, who were left in horror; Evans himself let out a shriek that echoed through the woods. While some of the men transported the body to Mr. Mead's store, Evans and the officer were left behind so they could locate the missing remains. Hesitant at first, Evans led him to a mill a mile away, where he lifted a rock to reveal where he had buried the parts he had cut off. By then, news of the discovery had spread, and fearing that the killer would be lynched by a mob Sheriff Drew hid him in his house until his trial would begin.

== Trial, confession and execution ==
Soon after he was charged with Lovering's murder, Evans denied killing her, claiming that the elusive Webster had killed the girl and that he had been paid to help conceal the body. His claims disregarded, Evans was now being investigated for a slew of mutilation-slayings that had occurred over the past two decades. Among the most prominent were the following:

- October 30, 1850: The abduction, rape, and murder of a 5-year-old girl in Derry, New Hampshire; in that same fall, Evans was living with his second wife in Salem, Massachusetts, when she left him. He claimed to have travelled to Derry and randomly happened upon the house of a Mr. Mills, whose door was ajar. Hearing moaning coming from inside the home, Evans sneaked in and found several children on the floor, surrounding the victim, who appeared sickly. After "examining" her, Evans concluded that she wouldn't live long, and, wishing to dissect a human corpse, he took her out to the nearby woods. He raped and strangled the girl, and then began inspecting the corpse, finding that one of her hips and part of the spine were deformed. However, a feeling of guilt overtook him and he decided against dissecting the corpse. Evans then buried it under a rotten chestnut tree stump. He later claimed to have attempted to find the body the following year, but was unsuccessful in doing so.
- 1862: The rape of a 14-year-old girl in Strong, Maine, northwest of Augusta, whose throat was subsequently cut. An Irish national was wrongfully imprisoned for this murder, and later died in prison.
- June 12, 1865: The Joyce children murders in Roxbury, Massachusetts (now part of Boston). Isabella (14) and her brother John (12) were killed in a location named Bussy's Woods, with the girl being raped and stabbed a multitude of times. Her brother, frozen in fear, was subsequently caught and stabbed to death. It was determined that Evans was in Boston at the time, as part of his preaching lectures.
- June 10, 1872: The murder of a woman found dead near the woods in Fitchburg, Massachusetts.

He would eventually be put on trial solely for Lovering's murder, which began on February 3, 1873, and was presided over by Justices Doe and Ladd. Two days into the trial, on the day of his sentencing, Evans attempted to hang himself with his own suspenders, but was stopped by the jail guard. He was then shackled and brought back to the courtroom. Despite his counsel's attempts to portray him as insane, it was conclusively proven by the prosecution's examining psychiatrist that Evans was perfectly aware of the circumstances under which he had killed Lovering. After the jury were recalled to make a decision, it took them only half an hour to return a verdict of guilty. The court then immediately sentenced the defendant to be hanged in the state prison. While awaiting execution, Evans was visited by E. F. Pillsbury, an attorney from Maine who had been asked by the governor to interview him about the child murder that had occurred in Strong. Despite Pillsbury's best attempts, Evans continued to deny his guilt in the crime. Two days after the interview, Evans was interviewed again by Sheriff Drew, and this time he implied that he might have been responsible for the Joyce murders but didn't admit it directly.

In the weeks approaching his execution Evans started having vivid dreams and visions, which some papers believed might be related to the murders. While sitting on death row, he appeared to be in relatively high spirits, believing that he would have his sentence commuted or even be pardoned. In a conversation with the sheriff stationed in the prison, he expressed that his only true regret was his ignorance of his "call" to preach the Millerite doctrine and that if he had, he would be an honored member of that society. In addition, he professed his belief that he was one of the chosen few whose sins would be turned into virtues upon death.

Before his execution, Evans wrote down a confession in which he professed his guilt in the killings of the Mills child and Lovering, as well as several thefts and frauds, but continued to deny responsibility for any other murders. He also requested that after his death, his body should be sold to Dartmouth College's anatomical division for dissection and the money given to his son. On February 18, 1874, after reading out his written confession and bidding his farewells to his children, the black cap was placed over Evans' head and the trap door sprung open not long after. After a few minutes, he was pronounced dead. That same evening, his body was given for dissection to the college as he had asked, where it was dissected by Dr. A. H. Crosby.

== See also ==
- Capital punishment in New Hampshire
- Capital punishment in the United States
- List of people executed in New Hampshire
