= Murder of Florence Arlene Small =

American murder in 1916 in the state of New Hampshire

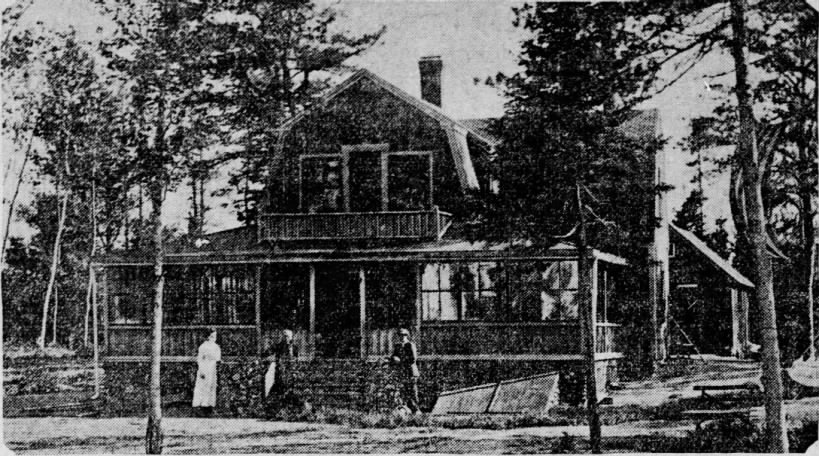
- The couple's home prior to the fire
- Location: Ossipee, New Hampshire, U.S.
- Date: September 28, 1916; 110 years ago
- Attack type: Murder by strangulation and gunshot
- Weapons: Window cord and handgun
- Deaths: Florence Arlene Small, aged 37
- Perpetrators: Frederick L. Small, husband
- Verdict: Guilty
- Convictions: First-degree murder
- Sentence: Death by hanging

The murder of Florence Arlene Small occurred on September 28, 1916. She was the victim of a brutal murder in her home in Ossipee, New Hampshire. Her husband, Frederick L. Small, was convicted of the crime and was hanged on January 15, 1918.

== Victim ==
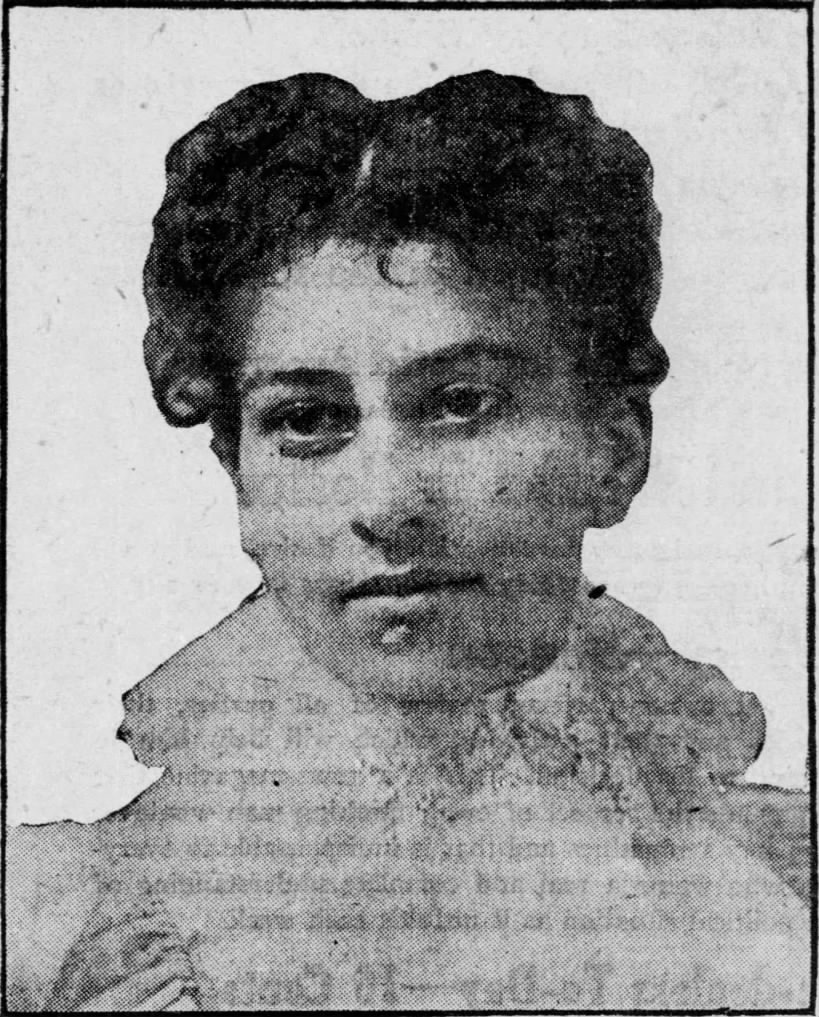
Florence Arlene Small

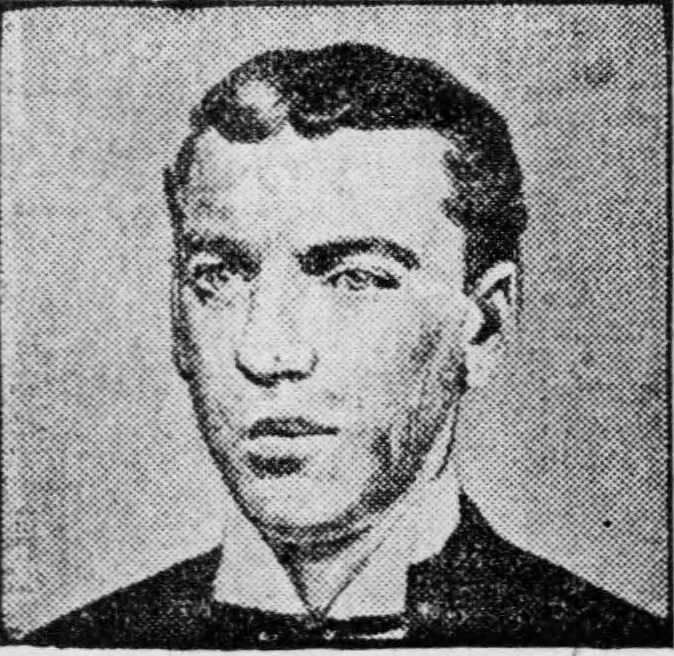
Frederick L. Small

Florence Arlene Small (née Curry) (Note: Some sources give her middle name as Aileen.) was born in Hortonville, Nova Scotia, on March 27, 1879. She married Frederick L. Small, a Boston stockbroker, in Fayville, Massachusetts, in December 1911. (Note: Other reports give the couple's date of marriage as December 3, 1913.) It was Frederick L. Small's third marriage. The couple moved to Ossipee, New Hampshire, in May 1914.

On September 28, 1916, the couple's home in Ossipee, (Note: Initial newspaper reports gave the location as Mountain View, New Hampshire.) known as Fellsmere, was destroyed by fire. Because of the remoteness of the cottage, the fire enveloped the house before rescuers could intervene. Mr. Small was away on a business trip, and Mrs. Small's body was found in the debris. Though she was badly burned by the fire, examiners found Mrs. Small to have "a cord about her neck, a bullet wound over one eye and wounds on the head."

The couple had no children. Mrs. Small was survived by her mother, Elizabeth Curry, and sister, Norma Curry.

== Murder charge and trial ==
Frederick L. Small was charged with murdering his wife, allegedly to collect $20,000 ($591,743 in 2025) from an insurance policy. Judge John Kivel presided. Attorney William S. Matthews served as Small's senior counsel. County Solicitor Walter Hill and Attorney General James P. Tuttle represented the prosecution. Police Inspector Andrew Houghton of a Boston-based detective agency investigated the case.

Local residents of Ossipee testified at the trial to the character of Frederick L. Small and his aggressive physical and verbal behavior towards his wife. Helen Connor testified that when she complimented Small on his wife's cooking, he said that "sometimes he had to take the axe to her." In addition, Philip L. Davis stated that Small "kicked his wife, swore at her, and ordered her into the house" after a flagpole they were trying to install fell to the ground. The local physician testified that he was called to the Small establishment where he found the woman bleeding. Small admitted that he had "struck her over the head with a bootjack; damn it, I should kill her. I will kill her."

According to testimony presented by the State, within 30 minutes after Mrs. Small ate lunch, Mr. Small beat, strangled, and shot his wife before leaving on a trip to Boston. This trip served as Small's alibi, since he was out of town when the house caught on fire. Small had with him his Masonic apron and other valuable papers, even though the trip was to be a short one. However, chemical residue (resin) was found smeared on the torso of Florence's body. Small's .32 caliber pistol (which matched the bullet found on the left side of her forehead) and a clock, that served as a mechanism to start the fire remotely, were found in the house's ruins. This circumstantial evidence led prosecutors to argue the death of Florence Arlene Small was premeditated and not accidental.

== Sentencing and appeal ==
Frederick L. Small was found by a jury to be guilty of first degree murder with a stipulation of capital punishment. He maintained his innocence.

By New Hampshire law at the time, a year and a day was required between "the passing of a death sentence and its execution." In January 1918, a petition to stay Small's execution was filed. The document alleged that one of the jurors stated that "he knew Small was guilty" before any evidence had been presented in the case. Small's lawyers also filed a motion for a new trial. Both were denied. Small was hanged on January 15, 1918, at the New Hampshire State Prison in Concord.

Florence Arlene Small is buried in the Grant Hill Cemetery in Center Ossipee. Through the efforts of the Ossipee Historical Society and citizens of Ossipee, she was given a proper ceremony on the 91st anniversary of her death, and her site is now identified with a marker.
