= Penelope Kenny =

- Born: 1719; Kingdom of Ireland
- Died: December 27, 1739 (aged 20); Portsmouth, Province of New Hampshire
- Status: Executed
- Conviction: Feloniously concealing the death of an infant bastard child
- Penalty: Death

Penelope Kenny (1719 – December 27, 1739) was an Irish servant who was executed by hanging for the murder of her newborn child in the Province of New Hampshire, along with Sarah Simpson, who was also convicted of murdering her newborn child. Kenny was born in or near Limerick and was 20 years old.

== See also ==
- Capital punishment in New Hampshire
- List of people executed in New Hampshire

Preceded by Sarah Simpson	Executions carried out in New Hampshire	Succeeded by Eliphaz Dow
