= Ruth Blay =

- Born: June 10, 1737; Haverhill, Province of Massachusetts Bay
- Died: December 30, 1768 (aged 31); Portsmouth, Province of New Hampshire
- Cause of death: Hanging
- Status: Executed
- Conviction: Concealing the death of an infant bastard child
- Penalty: Death by hanging

Ruth Blay (June 10, 1737 – December 30, 1768) was a schoolteacher executed by the Province of New Hampshire. She was the last female executed in New Hampshire.

== Biography ==
A resident of South Hampton, Blay was a schoolteacher, working in several local towns; her mother was tailor in Portsmouth where Ruth Blay was living until she fled to South Hampton. She was convicted of concealment of an illegitimate child, which was later found under the floor of the barn next to the house in which she was staying. She was not convicted of killing the baby. However, the coroner, Samuel Folsom, said the baby's death had been brought about by violence.

At the time, concealment of an illegitimate child, whether it survived birth or not, was punishable by hanging. Her trial began on September 3, 1768, and she was found guilty and sentenced to death. Ruth Blay's original execution was set for November 24, 1768. She was waiting for a pardon from Governor Benning Wentworth who gave her 4 reprieves in total which pushed her actual execution date to December 30, 1768. She was executed by Thomas Packer, Portsmouth’s High Sheriff, who had also overseen the execution of Eliphaz Dow in 1755.

== Execution ==
On December 30, 1768, Ruth Blay was transported by horse cart from the town jail to a hill overlooking a parcel of parish land where a farmer grazed his cattle. Hundreds, possibly over a thousand, gathered to witness her execution. In their rush for a clear view, they damaged the stone walls surrounding the field. After a brief ceremony, including a stern sermon from a local minister, Sheriff Packer placed a noose around Blay’s neck as she stood on the cart. Moments later, he drove the cart away, leaving her to die a slow and agonizing death by suffocation. These are the stark facts reported in contemporary newspapers and official records.

== Legacy ==
Ruth Blay’s body was buried by workers in an unmarked grave at the base of Gallows Hill, though the exact location remains unknown. Today, the area has evolved into four graveyards collectively known as South Cemetery. Unsurprisingly, many locals believe the site is haunted.

== Mural ==
The Ruth Blay mural in Portsmouth, New Hampshire, honors Ruth Blay, a 31-year-old teacher who was executed in 1768 for concealing the birth of her illegitimate child. She was the last woman to be executed in the state. The mural was initiated by the nonprofit organization Friends of Ruth Blay, which seeks to bring awareness to historic and marginalized figures from Portsmouth's history. This specific project was part of their "History Through Art" initiative, aiming to use public art to tell stories of equity and justice. The mural, unveiled on July 26, 2021, was designed by artist Terrence Parker with contributions from Carl Aichele and DBG Design. It was made possible through donations by Kristen and Todd Adelman, owners of the building on 165 Court Street, where the mural is located. The design highlights Ruth Blay's story and her tragic treatment under the harsh laws of the time, shedding light on broader issues of gender injustice and societal inequality.

== Backstory ==
Ruth Blay fled to South Hampton to have her baby. She lived with the Currier family and claimed to them that her husband was traveling, yet no one still knows the name of the husband. The baby girl was delivered on June 10, 1768. The child was then found on June 14 under the floors of a barn. Ruth's students found the child in the morning due to a smell coming from the barn. Blay did not deny that the child was her; when the authorities indicated that they were going to examine her for a recent birth, she said there was no need because it was hers, claiming the child was dead at birth.

== See also ==
- Capital punishment in New Hampshire
- Capital punishment in the United States
- List of people executed in New Hampshire

Preceded by Eliphaz Dow	Executions carried out in New Hampshire	Succeeded by Elisha Thomas
