= Howard Long =

American murderer (1905–1939)

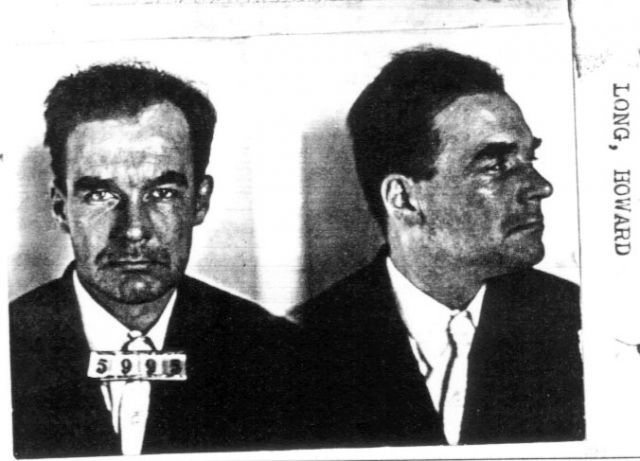
- Born: September 21, 1905; Hartford, Connecticut, U.S.
- Died: July 14, 1939 (aged 33); New Hampshire State Prison, New Hampshire, U.S.
- Status: Executed by hanging
- Conviction: First degree murder
- Penalty: Death (verdict reached December 13, 1937)

Details
- Victims: 2
- Span of crimes: 1924–1937
- Date apprehended: September 14, 1937

Howard Long (September 21, 1905 – July 14, 1939) was an American convicted murderer who was executed for the 1937 murder of 10-year-old Mark Neville Jensen in Gilford, New Hampshire. Long remains the most recent person to be executed by the state of New Hampshire.

== Background ==
Long was born on September 21, 1905, in Hartford, Connecticut. He was an only child, born to Sarah Long, and came from a wealthy family. During his youth, Long moved to Belmont, Massachusetts, where he committed his first crime. In 1924, he attacked and assaulted a young girl. During the attack, the girl managed to bite Long, causing him to flee. She survived and was found by a Belmont police officer. The bite mark helped convict Long, and he was sent to a Massachusetts reformatory. However, he was later paroled.

In July 1930, Long attacked his second victim. He lured a young boy with the promise of giving him a puppy and took him to an abandoned house, where he assaulted him. The boy survived the attack and Long was subsequently confined to Bridgewater State Hospital. The judge overseeing the case was bribed by Long's mother, who gave him $30,000 to set up a trust. The judge then petitioned the court to parole Long, leading to his release in 1935.

== Murders ==
After his release, the judge bought Long a general store in Alton, New Hampshire. Long left Belmont and moved to the state of New Hampshire where he worked as the storekeeper of the general store. It was here that he committed his first murder. On November 12, 1936, Long abducted a 9-year-old boy named Armand Nadeau in Dover. Long enticed Nadeau into his car and drove around with him for more than ten hours. When Long attempted to molest Nadeau, he became scared and jumped from the moving car. Nadeau hit his head and sustained a fatal head injury. Long went back to find the body and then hid it. The body of Nadeau was found by hunters a month after the murder, in the cellar of an abandoned house in Rollinsford. Nadeau's skull had been crushed.

Long committed his second and final murder on September 10, 1937, in Gilford. Long murdered and sexually assaulted a 10-year-old boy named Mark Neville Jensen from Laconia. Jensen had been walking with his mother's dress in order to return it. He had then disappeared. Witnesses reported seeing Jensen at various towns and cities throughout that day. He was also seen at a restaurant and later was spotted walking with Long and his dog. Jensen's body was found the following night, in a wooded area in Gilford. He had been beaten to death and his head had been crushed by an automobile screw jack.

== Trial and execution ==
Evidence linked Long to the murder of Jensen and police arrested him less than a week later. Long then confessed to the murder of Jensen. Further evidence also linked Long to the murder of Nadeau. The trial of Long began on December 6, 1937. On December 13, Long was found guilty and was sentenced to death. He was originally scheduled for execution on December 30, 1938, but the execution was postponed.

Long was executed via hanging at 1:27 a.m. on July 14, 1939. He was executed in a converted storeroom at the New Hampshire State Prison in Concord. It took seven minutes for Long to die and the process was described in detail in a newspaper at the time. Long was buried at Pine Grove Cemetery in Manchester, New Hampshire. A paper noted that the only people attending his burial were the cemetery workers. The rope that was used to hang Long was cut into smaller pieces. One piece was given to the Laconia, New Hampshire Sheriff Frederick D. Elliot and the other piece was property of the New Hampshire Department of Corrections until donated to the New Hampshire Historical Society in 2001.

Long remains the last person to be executed in New Hampshire. Capital punishment was abolished in New Hampshire on May 30, 2019. This could mean Long will be the last ever person to be executed by the state. However, one person, Michael K. Addison, still remains on death row in New Hampshire. The abolishment was not retroactive thus does not apply to Addison's case, meaning he could still, although very unlikely, be executed.

== See also ==
- List of most recent executions by jurisdiction
- List of people executed in New Hampshire
- List of people executed in the United States in 1939

Preceded by Frederick L. Small	Executions carried out in New Hampshire	Succeeded by None
