= Eliphaz Dow =

- Born: 1705
- Died: May 8, 1755 (aged 49–50); Portsmouth, Province of New Hampshire
- Status: Executed
- Conviction: Murder
- Penalty: Death by hanging

Eliphaz Dow (1705 – May 8, 1755) of Hampton Falls in the Province of New Hampshire was the first male known to have been executed in what is now the U.S. state of New Hampshire. Two women, Penelope Kenny and Sarah Simpson, had been executed in 1739.

== Crime ==
Eliphaz, the son of Joseph and Hannah Dow, was a shoemaker, married but with no known children. He was convicted of the murder of Peter Clough, also from Hampton Falls. It appeared, upon evidence, that a feud had subsisted between them for quite some time. On 12 December 1754, they accidentally met at the house of Eliphaz' brother Noah Dow. Clough accused Dow of maliciously killing one of his cows. They began to threaten each other, then Clough challenged Dow to go out of the house to fight. Dow was a slightly built man who was not much of a fighter while Clough was an intimidating man who was a local blacksmith. Clough went outside and Dow followed. Dow picked up his brother's hoe and struck Clough with a massive blow on the side of the head which instantly killed him.

== Trial ==
Dow was arrested on the same day of the crime. He went before the Honorable Judge Meshech Weare. Dow pleaded "strictly self defense" at his trial. He was committed to the prison in Portsmouth. "At the February term of Superior Court, he was indicted, tried & convicted: and sentence was pronounced upon him that he should be hanged by the neck until he should be dead." His sentence was ordered to be executed on March 20, 1755. Matthew Livermore, Esq. was the attorney general of the Province of New Hampshire that prosecuted Dow. Dow had two reprieves that were allowed until May 8, 1755.

== Execution ==
Many people came out to see Dow's public execution. He became the first male to be executed in New Hampshire. Dow was executed by Thomas Packer, Portsmouth's High Sheriff, who also executed Ruth Blay 13 years later in 1768. Some accounts have Blay and Dow as second cousins.

The exact location of the gallows has been debated for some time. Some accounts have descriptions of the corner of South and Sagamore Streets. Some historic accounts have the location of Ward's Corner. Dow was hanged for about three hours, between the time of twelve noon until three in the afternoon. His body was buried in the road a few rods from the gallows, just at the declivity of the hill.

An account in the New Hampshire Gazette, August 24, 1847, states that bones discovered near the site were "doubtless" his. The bones were only three or four feet under ground, and "together with the bones, were found pieces of bark and leather." This was thought to indicate that he was buried with his shoes on.

== See also ==
- Capital punishment in New Hampshire
- Capital punishment in the United States
- List of people executed in New Hampshire

| Preceded by Penelope Kenny | Executions carried out in New Hampshire | Succeeded by Ruth Blay |
