= Walter H. Bourque Jr. =

Second longest-serving inmate in the United States (1937–2025)

Walter Henry Bourque Jr.
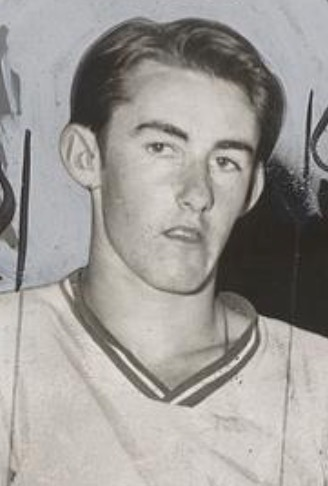
- Bourque in July 1955
- Born: 1937; Manchester, New Hampshire, U.S.
- Died: January 10, 2025 (aged 87)
- Known for: Second-longest serving prisoner in US history (69 years, 31 days)
- Status: Deceased
- Conviction: Second-degree murder
- Penalty: Life imprisonment with the possibility of parole after 18 years

Details
- Date: July 6, 1955
- Country: United States
- State: New Hampshire
- Date apprehended: July 8, 1955

Walter Henry Bourque Jr. (1937 (Note: While some records estimate a 1938 birth date, reporting from July 1955 and November 1955 state Bourque was 17, and reporting from December 1955 states he was 18, indicating a birth date in late 1937.) – January 10, 2025) was an American convicted murderer who was the second longest-serving prisoner in United States history, and the third-longest worldwide.

Bourque served 69 years and 31 days after being sentenced to life in prison for second-degree murder in 1955 at the age of 18.

== Early life ==
Bourque was born in 1937, in Manchester, New Hampshire, to Walter Bourque Sr. and his wife Aurore Bourque. He had a younger brother, George. At the time of the murder, Bourque was employed at a local shoe factory.

== Murder and sentencing ==
On July 6, 1955, Bourque—17 years old at the time—sexually assaulted and murdered his neighbor, four-year-old Patricia Ann Johnson, in the cellar of their adjoining tenement. Bourque stated that at approximately 3:30 p.m., he lured Johnson into the cellar and assaulted her. When Johnson threatened to tell her mother, Bourque choked her and threw a cap pistol at her before ultimately killing her with an axe.

Following the murder, Bourque dug two separate holes in the earth-floor cellar of the tenement. He buried Johnson's body in a hole 2 1/2 feet deep, covered it with dirt, and placed a window screen over the grave; he buried her clothing in a second hole nearby. After concealing the sites, he returned to his apartment.

Bourque was involved in the search for the missing girl for two days, which included over 1,000 volunteers. On July 8, the victim's father, Richard Johnson, informed police that his daughter occasionally visited the cellar to watch Bourque chop wood; police subsequently took Bourque into custody. After two hours of questioning, he confessed to two officers and led them to her body. He was subsequently charged with first-degree murder and held without bail.

On July 11, Bourque pleaded not guilty in New Hampshire Superior Court. Following a grand jury indictment for first-degree murder on September 13, he again pleaded not guilty on September 19; his trial was set for December 5, 1955. At trial, Bourque admitted to the murder while on the stand. Judge William A. Grimes instructed an all-male jury to choose between four separate indictments: first-degree murder with capital punishment (hanging), first-degree murder with a mandatory life term, second-degree murder which could carry up to life, or first-degree manslaughter with a maximum 30-year sentence. On December 10, the jury convicted him of second-degree murder; he was subsequently sentenced to life imprisonment with the possibility of parole after 18 years.

== Imprisonment ==
Bourque began his sentence at the New Hampshire State Prison for Men. In 1966, his application for parole was rejected due to the nature of his crime. He was transferred to a minimum-security unit in 1977 in preparation for leaving prison, but was accused of inappropriate conduct with minors, though he was not criminally charged. He was then transferred to the New Hampshire State Hospital in 1978 to participate in a sex offender program. While there, he was granted off-grounds privileges, including a 72-hour unescorted pass in 1979 to visit friends in Farmington, where he recalled visiting a club. At the time of this pass, Bourque was 41 years old and had already served 24 years for murder. However, he was returned to prison later that year after stealing a $92 check belonging to another patient, leading to a forgery charge.

In 1999, the parole board indicated it would release Bourque if he successfully completed a sex offender program. However, he was not assessed for the necessary treatment at that time to determine his eligibility for the program. In May 2004, after the Concord Monitor brought the case to his attention, John Eckert, an executive assistant to the parole board, requested again that Bourque be assessed.

Bourque continued to work in the prison print shop, a position he started on March 1, 1958. On June 30, 1986, he was moved into the prison's newly constructed North Unit. Although he originally knew how to operate every machine in the shop, he later exclusively operated the letter press to number order forms for state agencies, stamping up to 1,000 forms per hour. Bourque maintained a strict weekday routine, waking at 5:45 a.m., attending counts, and spending his off-hours watching television, observing other inmates play basketball, or trading canteen items like coffee and food with fellow prisoners.

Bourque expressed deep remorse over the 1955 murder, stating that he thought about Johnson constantly and wished someone had stopped him on the stairs. He acknowledged becoming institutionalized, noting that prison was all he knew and that his fellow inmates had become his family.

Bourque died in custody on January 10, 2025, after serving 69 years, 31 days. Only one other U.S. inmate is known to have served a longer sentence: Francis Clifford Smith, who served 70 years, 31 days in prison.

== See also ==
- List of longest prison sentences served
