= New Hampshire State Prison for Women =

Women's prison in New Hampshire, U.S.

Coordinates: 43°13′31″N 71°33′35″W

- Interactive map of New Hampshire State Prison for Women
- Location: 42 Perimeter Road Concord, New Hampshire
- Status: Operational
- Security class: maximum, medium, and minimum security
- Capacity: 105
- Opened: 2018
- Managed by: New Hampshire Department of Corrections

New Hampshire State Prison for Women is an American women's prison in Concord, New Hampshire. It is the only women's prison in the U.S. state of New Hampshire. The New Hampshire Department of Corrections facility is also located in Concord.

== History ==
The original New Hampshire State Prison for Women was located in Goffstown and was created in 1989 in response to a sex discrimination lawsuit against the New Hampshire authorities. The old prison received criticism for discriminations on the grounds of the inmates having fewer facilities and them receiving fewer support services than the equivalent New Hampshire State Prison for Men. A class action lawsuit was brought against the New Hampshire Department of Corrections as a result of the poor facilities at the Goffstown prison.

Accordingly, plans were made for the construction of a new prison for women in New Hampshire. The new prison opened in 2018 in Concord after decades of legal battles concerning the services offered at the old Goffstown facility. It houses maximum, medium, and minimum security prisoners and overflow prisoners from the county prisons, which often lack appropriate facilities for women. Due to New Hampshire state law, 0.5% of the construction costs had to be set aside for the prisoners to have space to create art on certain prison walls.

Since 2008, the Saint Anselm College's Knights of Columbus and a group of women from the prison have started a recycling program within the prison. In 2009, Saint Anselm's Knights of Columbus Council #4875 won the National Community Activity Award from the Supreme Council in Connecticut.

== Notable inmates ==
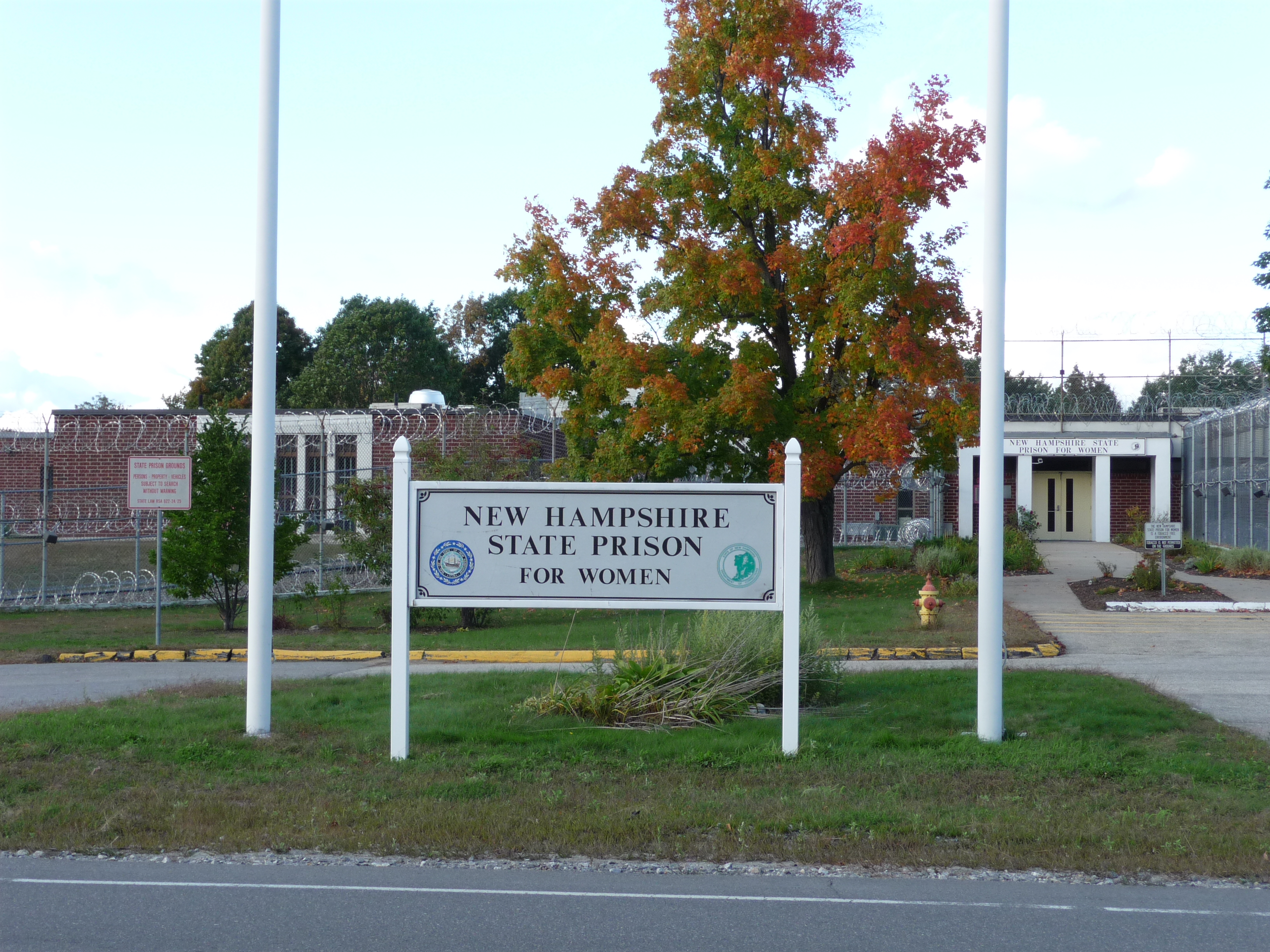
The former prison in Goffstown, NH

- Pamela Smart - Transferred to Bedford Hills Correctional Facility for Women in 1993.
- Sheila LaBarre - Serving two life sentences without the possibly of parole for the murders of two ex-boyfriends.

== See also ==
- New Hampshire State Prison for Men
