= Sarah Simpson =

American murderer

- Born: c. 1711 or 1712; Oyster River Plantation, Province of New Hampshire
- Died: December 27, 1739 (aged 27); Portsmouth, Province of New Hampshire
- Status: Executed
- Conviction: Feloniously concealing the death of an infant bastard child
- Penalty: Death

Sarah Simpson (c. 1711 or 1712 – December 27, 1739) was a widow executed by hanging for the murder of her newborn child in the Province of New Hampshire. She was one of the first two people to be executed in the history of the namesake state. She was executed with Penelope Kenny, who was also convicted of killing her newborn child.

== Life ==
Sarah Simpson, according to Reverend Jabez Fitch, was born likely in between 1711 or 1712, in the Oyster River Plantation (modern-day Durham, New Hampshire) near the Oyster River. Little information is known about her life, though she was said to have worked as an apprentice in Portsmouth.

== Death of child, murder trial and execution ==
On August 11, 1739, a dead female newborn was found floating in a well in Portsmouth by Reverend Jabez Fitch. Provincial officials suspected the baby belonged to a widowed woman named Sarah Simpson, as she had recently given birth. They issued warrants to investigate Simpson. During interrogation, Simpson admitted a recent stillbirth but denied that the infant in the well was hers. It was alleged that, soon after, she led the officials to a grave where a body of an infant, presumably hers, was buried "four inches underground by the riverside". The officials eventually charged Simpson with being the mother of the daughter in the well.

Researcher Christopher Benedetto cites that the motive behind the crime was stigma surrounding fornication (non-marital sex), and children born out of it. Simpson and Penelope Kenny, upon giving birth in August, knew that if they had to survive, they had hide the physical product (children) of their sexual improprieties.

=== Trial and conviction ===
The trial of August 1739 was described by Governor Jonathan Belcher to have been "long, tedious, attended with much trouble and difficulty". Over 30 witnesses testified in the Superior Court. By a jury of 12 men, Simpson and Kenny were convicted of "concealing the death of an infant child" on August 30. Simpson was sent to jail shortly after.

Leaving no estate, the two women were sentenced to be hanged on November 21, 1739. Belcher postponed the execution to December 27, possibly influenced by their remorse for their crimes.

=== Execution ===
On December 27, 1739, Simpson, along with Kenny, were led to the gallows by the Portsmouth ministers. Among them, that day, was a larger crowd than what was expected; it had snowed the day before, so the weather conditions would have continued to have been harsh.

Simpson gave a note to one of the ministers, which was to be read aloud. In that, she confessed to regretting her past marriage to her deceased husband, and advised her listeners to "marry in the Lord" when they marry.

Her and Kenny said their last words below the nooses before they were executed. The executioner was the Sheriff Eleazar Russell.

== See also ==
- Capital punishment in New Hampshire
- Capital punishment in the United States
- List of people executed in New Hampshire

Preceded by None	Executions carried out in New Hampshire	Succeeded by Penelope Kenny
