= New Hampshire Department of Corrections =

Government agency in the U.S. state of New Hampshire

- Abbreviation: NHDOC

Agency overview
- Formed: 1983
- Preceding agency: New Hampshire State Prison
- Employees: 851
- Annual budget: $107 million

Jurisdictional structure
- Operations jurisdiction: New Hampshire, US
- Map of New Hampshire Department of Corrections's jurisdiction
- Area: 9,350 square miles (24,200 km^{2})
- Population: 1,315,809 (2008 est.)
- General nature: Civilian police

Operational structure
- Headquarters: Concord, New Hampshire
- Agency executive: Helen Hanks, Commissioner

Website
- www.corrections.nh.gov

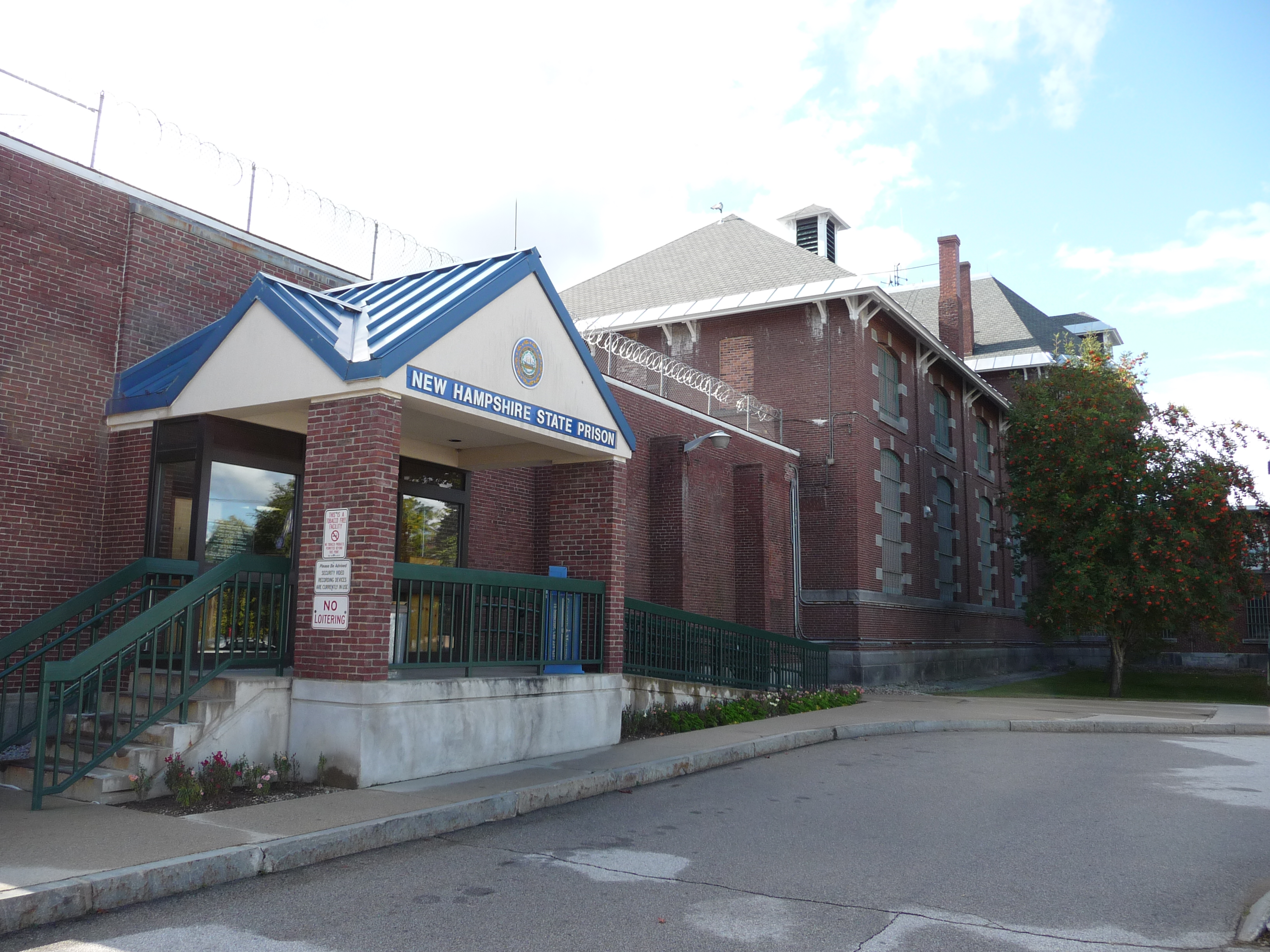
New Hampshire State Prison for Men

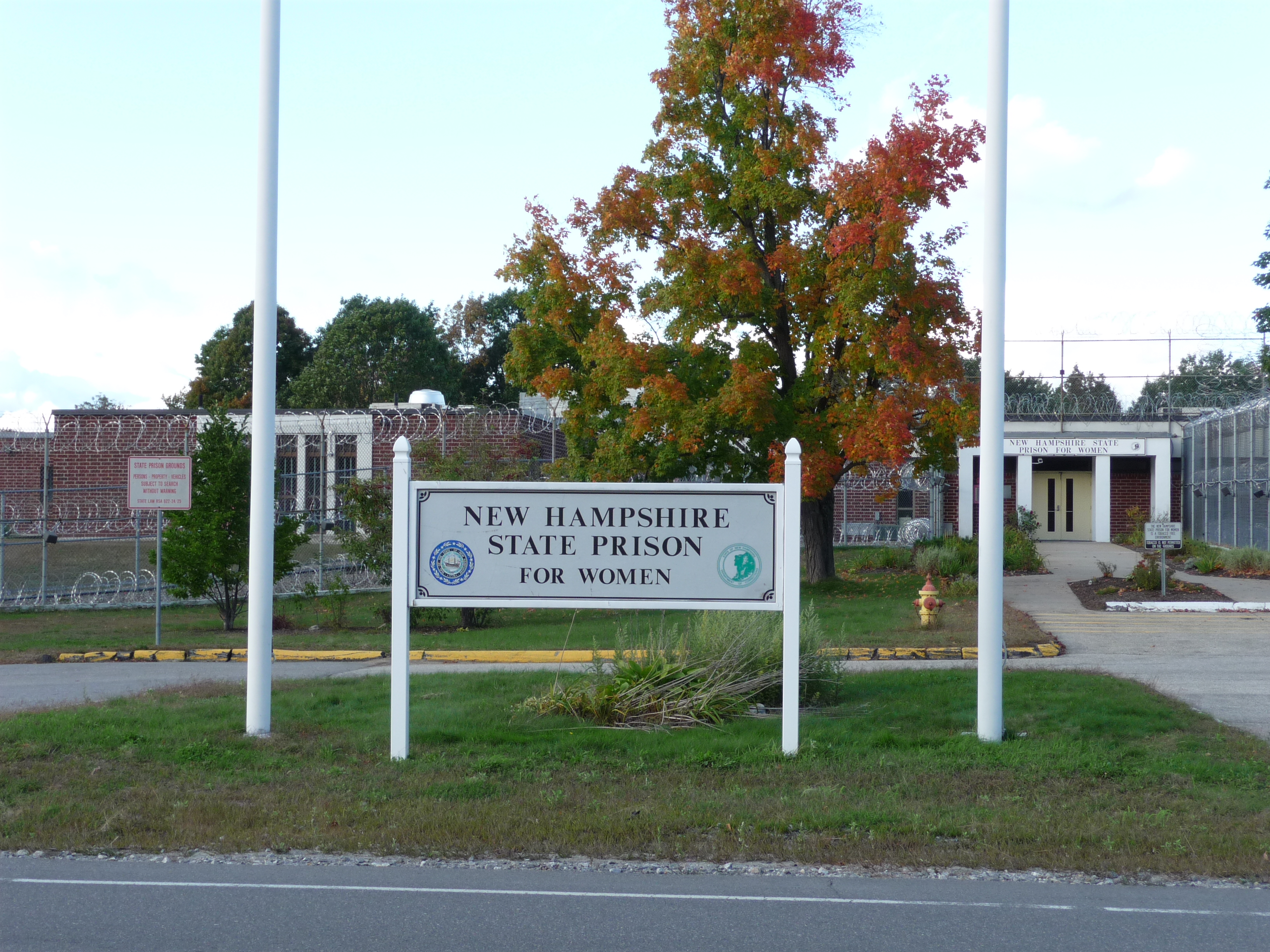
New Hampshire State Prison for Women

The New Hampshire Department of Corrections is the government agency in the U.S. state of New Hampshire charged with overseeing the state correctional facilities, supervising probation and parolees, and serving in an advisory capacity in the prevention of crime and delinquency. The largest correctional facility in the state is the New Hampshire State Prison for Men in Concord, which is managed by the New Hampshire Department of Corrections. The agency has its headquarters in Concord.

As of June 30, 2022, the department had an inmate population of 2,029 and 709 total employees. During the COVID-19 period, the department had an average of 34 security and 27 civilian staff retirements a year.

== Divisions ==
=== Administration ===
The Division of Administration oversees the business operations for the Department of Corrections.

=== Commissioner's Office ===
The commissioner of the department shall be appointed by the governor with the consent of the council and shall serve for a term of 4 years from the date of appointment and until a successor is appointed. The Commissioner is the chief administrative officer of the department and shall manage all operations of the department and administer and enforce the laws with which he or the department is charged. He shall report directly to the governor.

=== Adult Parole Board ===
The Adult Parole Board is an independent agency that reports directly to the Governor. The board consists of seven members appointed by the Governor and approved by the Executive Council. Members serve five-year terms, and may serve no more than two consecutive terms. By law, three board members must preside over each hearing. The board is part-time, which means that members report for duty only when scheduled for hearings. Board members are always available to issue arrest warrants for parole violators and to consult with parole officers regarding problem cases.

=== Correctional Industries ===
New Hampshire Correctional Industries manufactures goods and provides services to government and/or customers. It operates businesses in the agricultural, manufacturing, and service-related fields.

=== Field Services ===
The Division of Field Services supervises New Hampshire offenders who are not currently incarcerated. Field Services is also responsible for conducting pre-sentencing investigations. These investigations are requested by a court of law. They include an evaluation of the offender's criminal charge, a review of the circumstances including interviews with affected parties, and a recommendation to the sentencing judge.

The Division of Field Services also supervises offenders on probation or parole from other jurisdictions using an interstate compact agreement.

=== Forensic and Medical Services ===
The Division of Forensic and Medical Services is responsible for the provision and coordination of all health and mental health services received by inmates at all facilities operated by the Department of Corrections.

=== Public Information Office ===
The Public Information Office coordinates the release of public information to the public and to the media.

=== Division of Community Corrections/Transitional Housing ===
There are three Transitional Housing Units, formerly called halfway houses, and one Transitional Work Center. These facilities are operated by the Department of Corrections, Division of Community Corrections and are responsible for providing treatment and services to offenders that are preparing to transition back into the community.

=== Bureau of Programs ===
The Bureau of Programs is responsible for the development and implementation of offender programs geared toward rehabilitation and offender change. Programs include Correctional Counseling/Case Management, the Corrections Special School District (Granite State High School), Family Connections Center, Intervention Services, Parole Violator (PV) Program, Women's Services, Spiritual and Religious Services, and Library Services.

=== Victim Services ===
The New Hampshire Department of Corrections Victim Services Bureau provides services for crime victims and survivors consistent with their needs.

== State prison facilities ==
The Department of Corrections manages the operations of three secure prison facilities within the state:

Name	Location	Security level	Capacity	Prisoners	Gender
Northern NH Correctional Facility	Berlin	Medium and Minimum Custody	635	475	Male
State Prison for Men	Concord	Multi-level	1,408	1,220	Male
State Prison for Women	Concord	Medium-Minimum (mixed pop.)	224	124	Female

== Line of duty deaths ==
As of 2025, 1 officer of the New Hampshire Department of Corrections was killed in the line of duty

== See also ==
- List of law enforcement agencies in New Hampshire
- List of United States state correction agencies
- Prison
