= Murder of Michael Briggs =

Police officer murdered in New Hampshire, U.S.

- Location: Manchester, New Hampshire, U.S.
- Date: October 16, 2006; 20 years ago
- Attack type: Murder by shooting
- Weapon: Handgun
- Deaths: Michael Briggs
- Perpetrators: Michael Kiser Addison; Antoine Bell-Rodgers
- Motive: Avoiding arrest for robbery
- Verdict: Guilty
- Convictions: Addison: Capital murder (1 count), armed robbery, felony possession of a firearm Bell-Rodgers: Robbery
- Sentence: Addison: Death; Bell-Rodgers: 5-7 years imprisonment

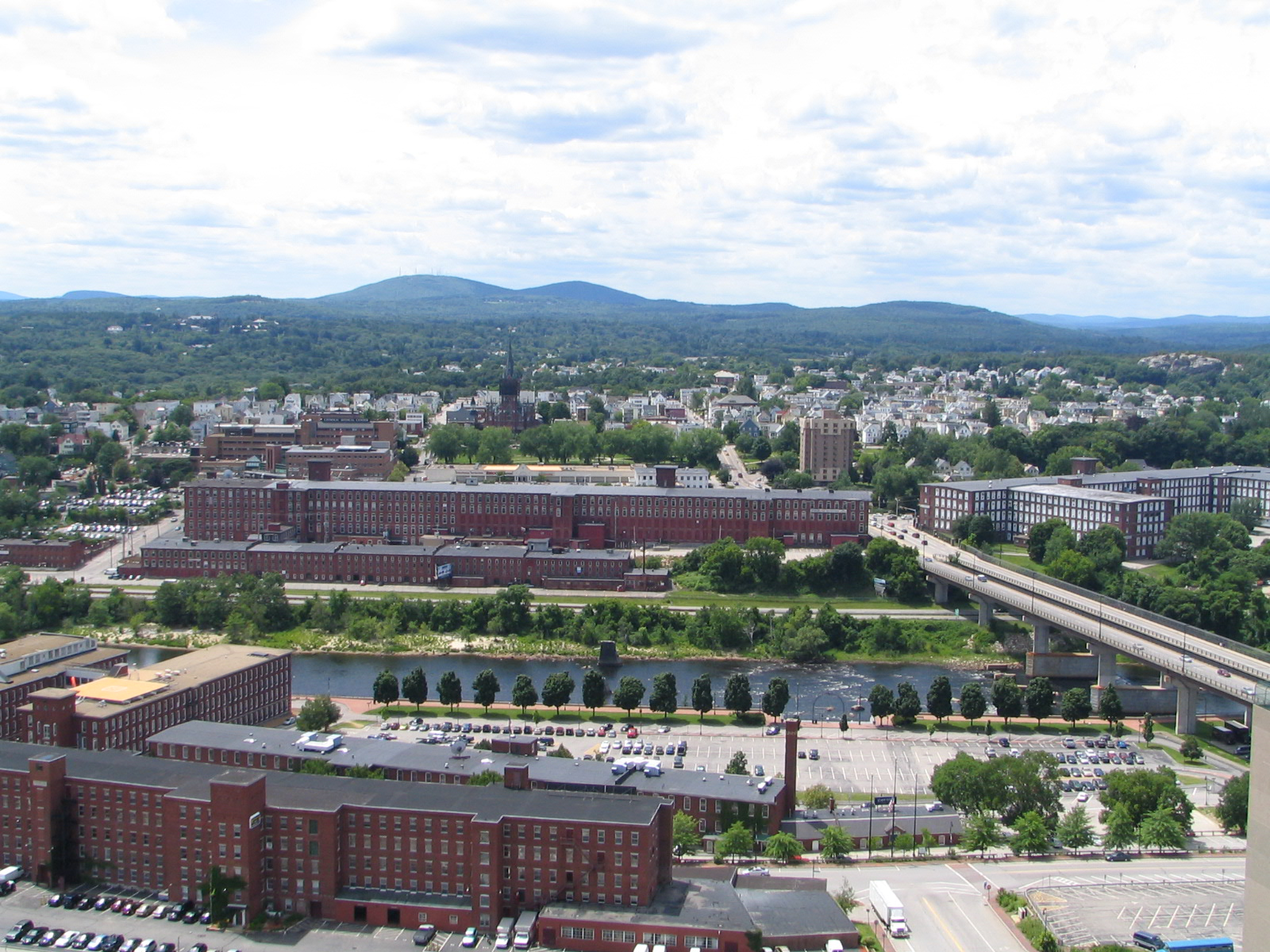
Manchester, New Hampshire in July 2006, three months before the murder

The murder of Michael Briggs occurred on October 16, 2006, in Manchester, New Hampshire, United States. Briggs, a police officer, was shot while on duty and was transported to the hospital, where he died of his injuries. The suspect, Michael "Stix" Addison, fled New Hampshire, prompting a manhunt by police. Fifteen hours after the shooting, Addison was arrested in Dorchester, Massachusetts. He was charged by Boston Police with being a fugitive from justice. He waived domestic extradition and was transported back to New Hampshire.

Addison was transported to the Suffolk County Jail in Massachusetts where his bail was set at $2 million (equivalent to $3.19 million in 2025). New Hampshire prosecutors sought the death penalty for Michael Addison, since killing the police officer qualified the crime as a capital murder. There was ongoing debate about capital punishment in New Hampshire, which had not executed anyone since Howard Long in 1939. A string of crimes that began a week earlier and culminated with the shooting of Officer Briggs on October 16, 2006, resulted in the arrest and questioning of two more people connected with Addison.

In March 2007, a trial date for Addison was set for early September 2008. This was the first trial for capital murder in the state since Gordon E. Perry was indicted for the capital murder of Officer Jeremy Charron in 1997. At the conclusion of the trial, Michael Addison was convicted of capital murder and sentenced to death. Addison is the only person on death row in New Hampshire. The state supreme court upheld his conviction and sentence in 2014–2015. The US Supreme Court declined to hear his case. In 2025, the state Supreme Court agreed to revisit the sentence as the state legislature had revoked the death penalty for all future cases, but ultimately declined to reduce Addison's sentence.

== Background ==
=== Michael Briggs ===
Michael Briggs (May 2, 1971 – October 17, 2006) was born in Epsom, New Hampshire, and served in the United States Marines from 1991 to 1995 after graduating from Pembroke Academy in 1990. From 1995 to 2001 he worked as a correctional officer and a police officer for the Epsom Police Department. On May 2, 2001, his 30th birthday, Briggs became a police officer for the Manchester Police Department and was assigned as a bicycle police officer. Briggs graduated from the New Hampshire Police Academy in November 2001. In 2004, he received a life-saving medal after saving residents from a burning building. He was awarded the Congressional Law Enforcement Award in October 2005 for the same actions. Briggs was a member of the New Hampshire Police Association. Briggs was married and the father of two young sons. He was a friend and co-worker of Jeremy Charron, who was killed on duty in August 1997. In August 2019, Mitchell Briggs, son of Michael Briggs, graduated from the NH Police Academy 18 years after his father.

=== Michael K. Addison ===
Born in Boston on March 19, 1980, Michael Addison was adopted at age two by Rosetta Addison, his maternal grandmother, and her husband, Lucious Addison, a disabled Vietnam veteran. Lucious and Rosetta later divorced, and Rosetta reared her teenage children and "Little Michael" in what was described as a chaotic setting. He attended high school in Dorchester but did not graduate. At trial, the defense presented material about Addison's troubled upbringing: his time with his grandmother in Brockton, Massachusetts and also his time with his alcoholic mother in one of Boston's most violent and drug-ridden housing projects in the Roxbury neighborhood. The defense argued for life imprisonment without parole.

At the time of the Briggs shooting, Michael "Stix" Addison was a Manchester, New Hampshire resident. There had been previous encounters between Officer Briggs and Michael Addison. In 2002, Addison was arrested by Briggs near the Queen City Bridge in Manchester. In March 2003, Addison received first aid from Briggs after a shooting incident, assistance which may have saved the young man's life. The shooter, Thomas Williams, was arrested on July 15, 2003, and pleaded guilty in March 2004. In October 2006, Williams was given a deal for a shortened sentence contingent upon his testifying for the prosecution in the Officer Briggs murder case.

In October 2003, Addison was arrested in Londonderry, New Hampshire, charged with false imprisonment, criminal restraint, prowling, and criminal threatening. Addison pleaded guilty to criminal restraint of Brian St. Peter in the dispute over drug money, a misdemeanor; he was sentenced to six months in the Rockingham County House of Corrections. The other charges were dropped in the plea deal. On August 6, 2004, Addison admitted to the fact that he had violated his Massachusetts probation by virtue of the false imprisonment.

== The shooting ==
According to court records, Addison was convicted of participating with Antoine Bell-Rodgers in three separate felonies in the six days preceding the Briggs shooting.

On October 16, 2006, Officer Michael Briggs and his partner Officer John Breckenridge were responding to a domestic disturbance call involving Addison and Antoine Bell-Rodgers. When both officers spotted the suspects, Briggs ordered them to stop. Bell-Rodgers stopped, but Addison continued walking away. When Officer Briggs instructed Addison to stop, Addison turned and shot Briggs before the officer could draw his weapon. Two other officers returned fire at Addison, who fled through an alleyway, dropping his handgun nearby. Bell-Rodgers surrendered to police but Addison fled the crime scene. Later, police found Addison's gun and T-shirt. In a court re-enactment, eyewitnesses claimed that moments before the shooting, they saw a dark gray van and two men jumping out of it and running north towards Lincoln Street where the shooting took place.

A manhunt was launched after the shooting. SWAT teams and local police searched throughout the city of Manchester looking for Addison. One SWAT team searched the apartment building where Addison's girlfriend, Angela Swist, lived and found clothing stained with blood in a bathtub and a bottle of bleach nearby. They questioned Swist about the items. Later, the police executed search warrants at two other apartment buildings, based on reports of Addison being seen there, where more evidence was found. Several schools were placed on lockdown as police and SWAT teams searched vehicles coming and going to work or school in the area.

Manchester Police Detectives learned during the investigation that Addison had fled with his other girlfriend (not Swist) to his grandfather's apartment in Dorchester, Massachusetts. Addison escaped from Manchester because the apartment he was hiding in was outside the Manchester SWAT Team's barricades. Manchester detectives provided the information to Boston Police Department's Anti-Crime Unit led by Boston Police Sergeant Gary Eblan, who ultimately located Addison hiding inside the apartment and took him into custody without incident after successful negotiations. Addison was held without bail.

=== Extradition and charges ===
After a brief hearing in Dorchester, Addison was turned over to Manchester Detectives and extradited to New Hampshire. During an interview shortly after Addison's arrest with Manchester Police Detectives, he denied any role in the murder of Briggs. During a taped interview, Addison told his story six different times before confessing to authorities that he shot at the police officers coming toward him. The Manchester Police Department, Det. Lt. Willard, sought a Capital Murder warrant for Addison, which the Manchester District Court signed, charging Addison with capital murder. Attorney General Kelly Ayotte sought the death penalty as murder of a police officer may be punishable by death under the state's capital punishment law. Later Addison was also charged with armed robbery, conspiracy and felony possession of a firearm in relation to a five-day crime spree that started a week before the homicide.

=== Investigation and further arrests ===
Detective Lieutenant Nick Willard of the Manchester Police Department led the investigation into the murder of Officer Briggs, as well as the ancillary crimes, and established the following events.

October 10, 2006 Antoine Bell-Rogers robs the owner of El Mexicano restaurant in Manchester at gunpoint, firing one shot into the ceiling and one into the floor between the owner's legs, while Michael K. Addison robs a customer at knifepoint of $300 and a cell phone.

October 11, 2006 Addison holds a female clerk at a 7-Eleven convenience store in Hudson at gunpoint while Bell-Rogers steals $280. During the investigation, his girlfriend Angela Swist and Teresia Shipley, another friend, turned themselves in to police after authorities issued warrants for their arrests. During an interview with police, Swist told officers that she drove Addison and Antoine Bell-Rodgers to the 7-Eleven on October 11, where Addison and his accomplice robbed the store and fled. She also admitted that she was the driver of the getaway car.

October 15, 2006 Addison and Bell-Rogers are involved in a gunfire incident on Edward J. Roy Drive in Manchester. Bell-Rogers, one of the men arrested at the scene of the October 16, 2006, shooting of Briggs, was later charged with firing a handgun at an apartment and felony possessing a firearm. He was not charged in connection with the shooting of officer Michael Briggs. A grand jury, however, charged Bell-Rogers with armed robbery and conspiracy for robbing a convenience store five days before the Briggs shooting. A bail of $50,000 (2006 USD) was set in October 2006 and was upheld in January 2007. On March 5, 2007, Bell-Rodgers asked the court to have his felony charges dropped.

On March 28, 2007, the Hillsborough County Superior Court re-indicted Bell-Rogers on the weapons charges after a defense lawyer tried to dismiss Bell-Rogers' original indictment. That same day, Teresia Shipley pleaded guilty on charges of helping Addison rob a convenience store days before the shooting of Briggs.

After a number of charges were resolved either through conviction or plea, Antoine Bell-Rogers was sentenced to 60½ years in prison.

== Trial and appeals ==
The trial was held in Hillsborough County Superior Court (Northern District), Hon. Kathleen A. McGuire presiding, case # 2007-S-00254.

Pretrial:

- November 17, 2006: A pre-trial hearing was conducted, in which police officers told the judge about the shooting on October 16, 2006. The pre-hearing allowed the officers and Judge William Lyons to place Michael Addison in superior (or state) court based on evidence. Some lawyers and legal observers suggested that the trial of Michael Addison could take years.
- February 16, 2007: Defenders of Michael Addison complained that the grand jury improperly subpoenaed records and eyewitness testimonies, as court rules state that prosecutors cannot present psychological evaluations, juvenile, and other records without authorization of the judge.
- February 23, 2007: Addison was indicted on capital murder charges by a grand jury.
- February 27, 2007: Addison pleaded not guilty to the capital murder charges during the five-minute court hearing. Another court hearing was set for March 6.
- March 8, 2007: The judicial council received $134,542 (2007 USD) to pay defense to represent Michael Addison.
- March 14, 2007: Judge Kathleen A. McGuire set a date for jury selection for Addison's capital murder trial to be conducted on September 2, 2008. McGuire said that the trial would start on that date after jury selection.
- March 23, 2007: Attorneys defending Addison planned to contest the use of capital punishment. They intended to explore controversial issues about the law and were expected to refer to a 1997 trial in which a man convicted of murdering a police officer was sentenced to life imprisonment without parole. In addition, the defense attorneys wanted a change of venue, to gain stricter security; and they wanted to prevent newspaper and television media from taking photographs of Addison while he was in prison and entering or leaving the courthouse. The defense said such photographs could bias viewers against him and complicate his right to a fair trial. Prosecutors wanted the trial to remain in Manchester and argued that moving Addison to a different courthouse would interfere with the trial. On April 13, 2007, the judge rejected the defense attorneys' request, saying that the trial would not affect jury selection and potential jurors had likely already seen published photos of Addison.
- April 27, 2007: Michael Addison was charged with armed robbery in relation to a robbery at a restaurant on October 10, 2006, several days before the October 16 shooting of Briggs.
- May 31, 2007: Attorneys for Michael Addison stated that the New Hampshire Supreme Court should halt all proceedings due to claims of how the courts handled the death penalty case for Addison. These claims included that the court should not impose the death penalty case at all or that it enact certain rules about how the courts would handle a death sentence.
- June 25, 2008: The trial court denied Addison's request for change of venue from the Superior Court in Manchester.
- July 1, 2008: The trial court granted Addison's request to bifurcate the sentencing portion of the trial, assuming a finding of guilt. The court made numerous decisions throughout the year that allowed the death penalty to be presented to the jury. Essentially, the determination by the jury regarding the death penalty will be made in two stages: first, whether the death penalty may be applied and, second, whether the death penalty should be applied, or if life without parole is the proper sentence.
- July 22, 2008: The trial court granted the defendant's motion to suppress his confession. It may not be used as evidence at trial in determining guilt.

Trial:

- September 22, 2008: Jury selection began.
- October 16, 2008: One day after the jury selection was completed, the defense filed a motion renewing its request for a change of venue, asking the court to strike the panel chosen. The Court denied the motion.
- October 20, 2008: In opening arguments, the defendant admits to murdering Officer Briggs, but claims it was not "knowing" but "reckless" and thus Second Degree Murder, subject to life imprisonment, but not the death penalty.
- November 10, 2008: After 14 days of testimony, closing arguments are presented.
- November 13, 2008: The jury unanimously found Michael Addison guilty of capital murder at the Hillsborough Superior Court in Manchester.
- November 17, 2008: The jurors, charged with determining whether the convicted killer is eligible for the death penalty, said yes. But, they found that the State had not proven that Addison purposely murdered Officer Briggs.
- November 21, 2008: The defense team pressed their case that mitigating circumstances called for life in prison without the possibility of parole as the sentencing phase opens.
- December 15, 2008: Final arguments presented in the sentencing phase. Jury deliberation begins.
- December 18, 2008: Jury sentences Addison to death by lethal injection.
- December 22, 2008: The judge imposes the death sentence, along with 63 years of incarceration for the prior convictions stemming from the Addison/Bell-Rodgers crime spree the week before the Officer Briggs murder.

Appeals:

- November 14, 2012: NH Supreme Court hears oral arguments in the appeal of the guilt, eligibility, and sentence selection phases of trial.
- April 10, 2013: NH Supreme Court announces a reduced oral argument calendar for April, May, and June to allow the justices time to address the significant issues raised in the Addison appeal.
- November 6, 2013: NH Supreme Court announces its decision in the pending appeal. The unanimous opinion states in part,

"With respect to the issues raised by the defendant on appeal, we find no reversible error. Accordingly, we affirm the defendant's conviction for capital murder. Furthermore, we conclude that the sentence of death was not imposed under the influence of passion, prejudice or any other arbitrary factor, and that the evidence was sufficient to support the jury's findings of aggravating circumstances. We note that our review of the defendant's sentence is not yet complete. Only after additional briefing and oral argument on comparative proportionality under RSA 630:5, XI(c) will we conclude our review of the defendant's sentence of death, at which time we will issue a further opinion." As to the open question, the relevant statute reads, "XI. With regard to the sentence the supreme court shall determine: ...(c) Whether the sentence of death is excessive or disproportionate to the penalty imposed in similar cases, considering both the crime and the defendant."

- January 15, 2015: Oral arguments before the NH Supreme Court on the question of comparative proportionality of the death sentence. The defense relies on the fact that the jury considered but failed to find that Addison "purposely" killed Officer Briggs. "Addison's case is unique because the jury imposed the sentence of death despite specifically rejecting the purpose to kill." The defense asks that the Court vacate the sentence of death, and enter a sentence of life imprisonment without possibility of parole (LWOP).
- April 30, 2015: The New Hampshire Supreme Court delivered its final decision in the State vs. Addison direct appeal. Following the proportionality review by the Supreme Court as mandated by the capital murder statute, it upheld the sentence (after affirming the conviction). Addison was scheduled to be executed for the October 16, 2006, shooting death of Manchester police officer Michael Briggs.

US Supreme Court denies certiorari:

- January 11, 2016: The United States Supreme Court denied the defendant's petition for writ of certiorari, declining to hear the case on direct appeal. New Hampshire's only death row case in more than 75 years is set to enter the complicated process known as a writ of habeas corpus. A status conference in the case was scheduled for the end of September. Addison was also appealing in federal court, and he had a federal hearing scheduled for May 26.

Habeas Corpus: The Concord Monitor reports, "Presently, Addison is appealing his conviction on habeus [sic] corpus grounds. Progress on that petition, launched in 2016, has ground to a near halt in Merrimack County Superior Court amid a flurry of mostly-sealed petitions over the years. But its existence has stopped a key catalyst: the one-year countdown clock between the end of Addison's appeals and the possibility of an execution."

Petition Seeking Exercise of Original Jurisdiction: On September 15, 2025, the state Supreme Court agreed to hear an appeal of the death sentence in the Briggs murder. The case is docketed as 2025-0273. In support of the petition, the American Civil Liberties Union of New Hampshire filed an Amicus brief with the NH Supreme Court asking that the death sentence be vacated: "A finding that Mr. Addison’s death sentence is excessive is supported by the New Hampshire Legislature’s repeal of the death penalty, the actions of other states post-repeal, and consideration of the racial aspects of this case making it particularly vulnerable to an unfair and disproportionate death sentence. For these reasons, Amici ask that this Court vacate Mr. Addison’s death sentence as excessive." New Hampshire hasn’t executed anyone since 1939. If his petition is granted, Addison would serve a life sentence without possibility of parole for conviction of murder. The State's 44-page answer brief was filed January 15, 2026. Oral argument took place on March 26, 2026. The entire proceeding before a three-judge panel was livestreamed by WMUR-TV.

The Supreme Court issued its order on October 6, 2026 dismissing the petition, and stating that the law as written does not allow for a second comparative proportionality review.

== Aftermath ==
=== Charities for Briggs family ===
The Manchester Police Patrolman's Association set up a charity fund for the Briggs family after the shooting. A charity set up in the Portsmouth Police Department raised more than $13,000 (2006 USD), while residents of Portsmouth raised over $1,000 (2006 USD). The Manchester Monarchs ice hockey team, in partnership with WGIR AM and FM radio, raised more than $55,000 (2006 US$) through auctions.

The Massachusetts College of Pharmacy and Health president gave the mayor of Manchester a $5,000 (2006 USD) check during a ceremony. The organization also set up a scholarship for the children of Michael Briggs, which covers the tuition at the college in Manchester. The only report of a charity scam was from Boston; two men were arrested. Police reports indicated that the men took advantage of Officer Briggs' murder by going around and asking for money for the Briggs family. About 62 people were reported being scammed by the perpetrators. Both men were charged with running the scam and impersonating police officers. Both men were held on $10,000 (2006 USD) bail.

=== Memorial ===
On October 21, 2006, family and friends of Michael Briggs and many others gathered at a memorial service held at the Lambert Funeral Home and later at the Merchantsauto.com Stadium after a long funeral procession through the city. Approximately 800–4,000 officers from across the state of New Hampshire attended the memorial service. Flowers and makeshift memorials were left at the police station as a tribute to Briggs. Representatives of the American Red Cross also attended the memorial service.

The city closed down parts of Elm Street for the funeral and procession; it suspended parking and meter restrictions (although some were reserved for the memorial service).

The Union Leader newspaper named Michael Briggs as the "New Hampshire Citizen of the Year" on December 31, 2006. On January 27, 2007, the Manchester Police Department retired the badge number (number 83) of Officer Michael Briggs during a ceremony outside the police station. In addition, the police department presented his family with the flag that flew over the police station the day of his death. A plaque featuring Briggs' photography was installed in the front lobby of the police department.

On March 20, 2007, the New Hampshire Fisher Cats minor league baseball team announced that they would retire the number 83 in honor of Officer Briggs on May 21, 2007. The number will be retired next to the number of Jackie Robinson (which is 42). In addition, team members will wear special jerseys carrying the patch of the Manchester Police Department and Officer Briggs' badge number.

In Epsom, a traffic circle (rotary) was renamed on June 4, 2007, to honor officers Michael Briggs and Jeremy Charron.

== Responses ==
=== Political response ===
- NH State Attorney General Kelly A. Ayotte said in an October 18, 2006, press release that the Joint Legislative Fiscal Committee had approved $450,000 (2006 USD) in order to pursue a capital murder case against Michael Addison.
- On March 7, 2007, a panel of the New Hampshire state government passed a bill named "Michael's Law" on a 3–0 vote. The bill recommends the state of New Hampshire pay $100,000 (USD) to the families of any police officer or firefighter killed on duty after October 1, 2006, and allows the state to buy insurance to cover cost benefit payments.
- A special commission has been studying the state's death penalty law. It heard testimony on December 4, 2009, that the prosecution of Addison cost $1.6 million and the public defense cost $1.1 million. Costs include forensics testing, expert witnesses, staff, and attorney, and other items, Deputy Attorney General Orville "Bud" Fitch told the commission.
- A 2014 bill to repeal the New Hampshire death penalty law (not applicable retroactively to the Addison case than on appeal) passed the House of Representatives by a wide 225-104 margin. The State Senate was split 12-12, and the bill was tabled. While Governor Maggie Hassan offered support for the bill, Lou D'Allesandro, the eight-term Senator from Manchester, blocked its passage. At the time, New Hampshire was the only state in New England that still authorized the death penalty.
- Governor Hassan said in 2015 that she did not favor the death penalty, but she would not commute Addison's sentence. Hassan announced plans in December 2015 to challenge Kelly Ayotte for her US Senate seat; she defeated Ayotte in 2016.
- Governor Chris Sununu vetoed a bill on June 20, 2018, that passed the legislature during the 2018 session to repeal the death penalty. The Senate did not have sufficient votes to override the veto.
- On May 3, 2019, Governor Sununu vetoed a second bill to repeal the death penalty. This time, the Senate was expected to have sufficient votes to override the veto.
- On May 30, 2019, Governor Sununu's veto was overridden by the legislature, officially abolishing capital punishment in New Hampshire. This action brought the use of capital punishment sentences in New England to an end, although the abolition law was not retroactive and did not apply to Addison's case.

== Media involvement ==
Many local and state news media outlets in New Hampshire and Massachusetts reported the death and memorial of Officer Briggs. Many local newspapers like the New Hampshire Union Leader had special coverage of the shooting and memorial on their websites. Other newspapers like the Portsmouth Herald, Boston Globe and the Washington Post also reported on the shooting and memorial of Michael Briggs.

The initial probable cause hearing was carried on live TV with Det. Lt. Nick Willard testifying to how the murder was committed under the questioning of NH Assistant Attorney General Karen Huntress. The courtroom was so full that officers watched the hearing live in media trucks parked outside the courthouse. Many television stations in New Hampshire also reported on the shooting and Briggs' memorial. One station, WMUR, televised the funeral procession and memorial service on October 21, 2006. However, a court ruling prohibited television and radio stations from performing live broadcasts of the murder trial (although one camera was allowed) according to a rule started by the New Hampshire Supreme Court in 2004. WMUR petitioned that ruling, and on April 13, 2007, another court ruling stated that the pre-trial hearings could be broadcast on television on a one-hour delay in case something unexpected occurs that cannot be televised. The local television station again petitioned for live, streaming coverage of the trial. The court granted their request over the defense team's objections while limiting the scope of their coverage.

== See also ==
- Capital punishment in New Hampshire
