= Bud Fitch =

American lawyer

Orville B. Fitch II

Acting New Hampshire Attorney General
- In office July 16, 2009 – August 24, 2009
- Preceded by: Kelly Ayotte
- Succeeded by: Michael Delaney

Deputy New Hampshire Attorney General
- In office February 8, 2006 – December 3, 2010
- Succeeded by: Michael Delaney

New Hampshire Senior Assistant Attorney General
- In office January 26, 2005 – February 8, 2006

Personal details
- Occupation: Lawyer

Orville B. "Bud" Fitch II is an American lawyer who served as Deputy Attorney General for the U.S. State of New Hampshire, and became the Acting Attorney General for New Hampshire, when Kelly Ayotte resigned on July 16, 2009. He left the Deputy Attorney General position in December 2010 to join Ayotte's staff. Previously he served as a Senior Assistant Attorney General heading the Civil Bureau of the New Hampshire Department of Justice.

In 2017, Fitch was hired by the office of the New Hampshire Secretary of State to investigate claims of voter fraud in New Hampshire.
