= New Hampshire State Prison for Men =

Prison in New Hampshire, United States

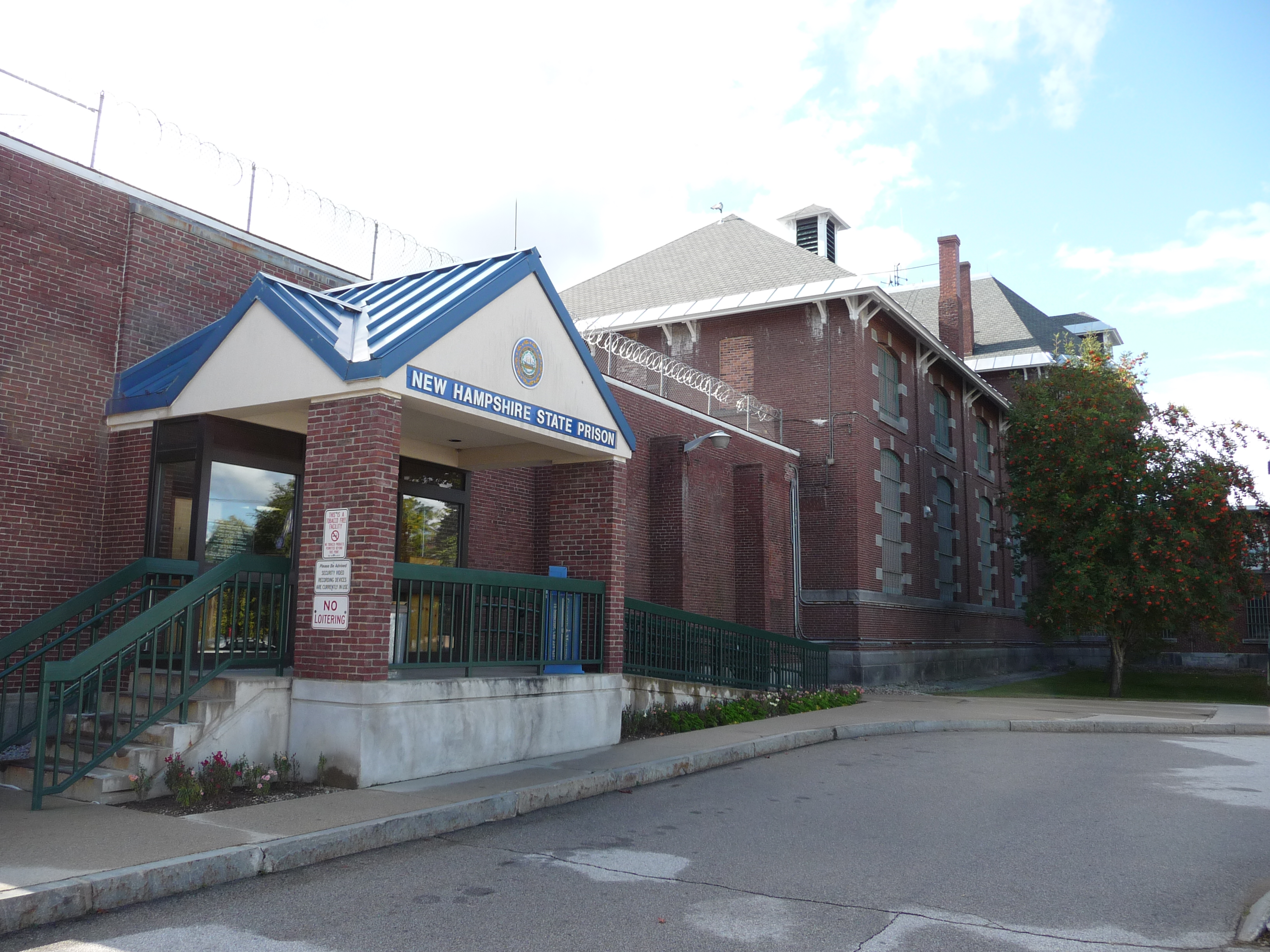
- New Hampshire State Prison

- Location in New Hampshire
- Location: Concord, New Hampshire; 43°13′38″N 71°33′31″W
- Status: Operational
- Security class: Maximum, medium, and minimum
- Capacity: 1,461
- Opened: 1878
- Managed by: New Hampshire Department of Corrections
- Warden: Michelle Edmark

The New Hampshire State Prison for Men (NHSPM) is a New Hampshire Department of Corrections prison in Concord, New Hampshire, United States and is equipped to accept maximum, medium and minimum security prisoners.

The prison, which was opened in 1878 to replace a previous prison constructed in 1812, is the oldest in New Hampshire Department of Corrections. It was expanded and renovated in the 1980s, and it houses maximum security male prisoners and has a 60-bed secure psychiatric unit and residential treatment unit.

The New Hampshire Corrections Special School District operates a high school within this facility, which provides both a high school diploma or the GED.

A full-time health services center including dental and long-term health care wing is operated within this facility and is capable of housing both male and female prisoners in need of long term, chronic, or terminal care.

Nineteen wardens have run this facility since it opened in 1878.

== Classification levels ==
The NHSPM houses different levels of classification (C) for male prisoners: minimum security (C1), low security (C2), general population (C3), medium security (C4), and maximum security(C5). An inmate is granted access to a bank account set up through the prison financial center. A maximum of $1,000 can be deposited into a prisoner's account by verified family and friends.

== Notable inmates ==
- Walter H. Bourque Jr. — An inmate who served nearly 70 years in prison for the axe murder of a four-year-old girl, committed when he was 17 years old.

== Gallery ==
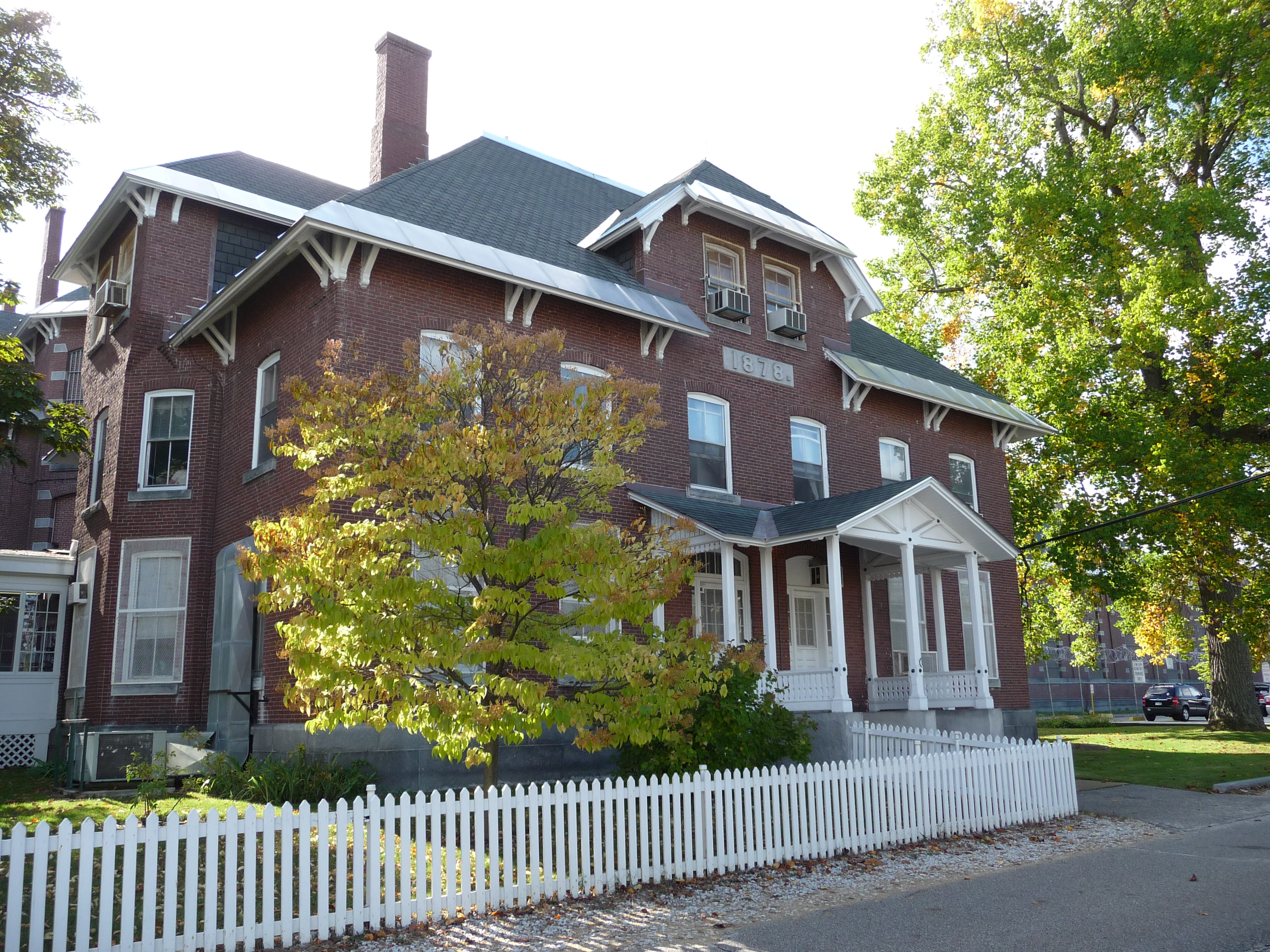

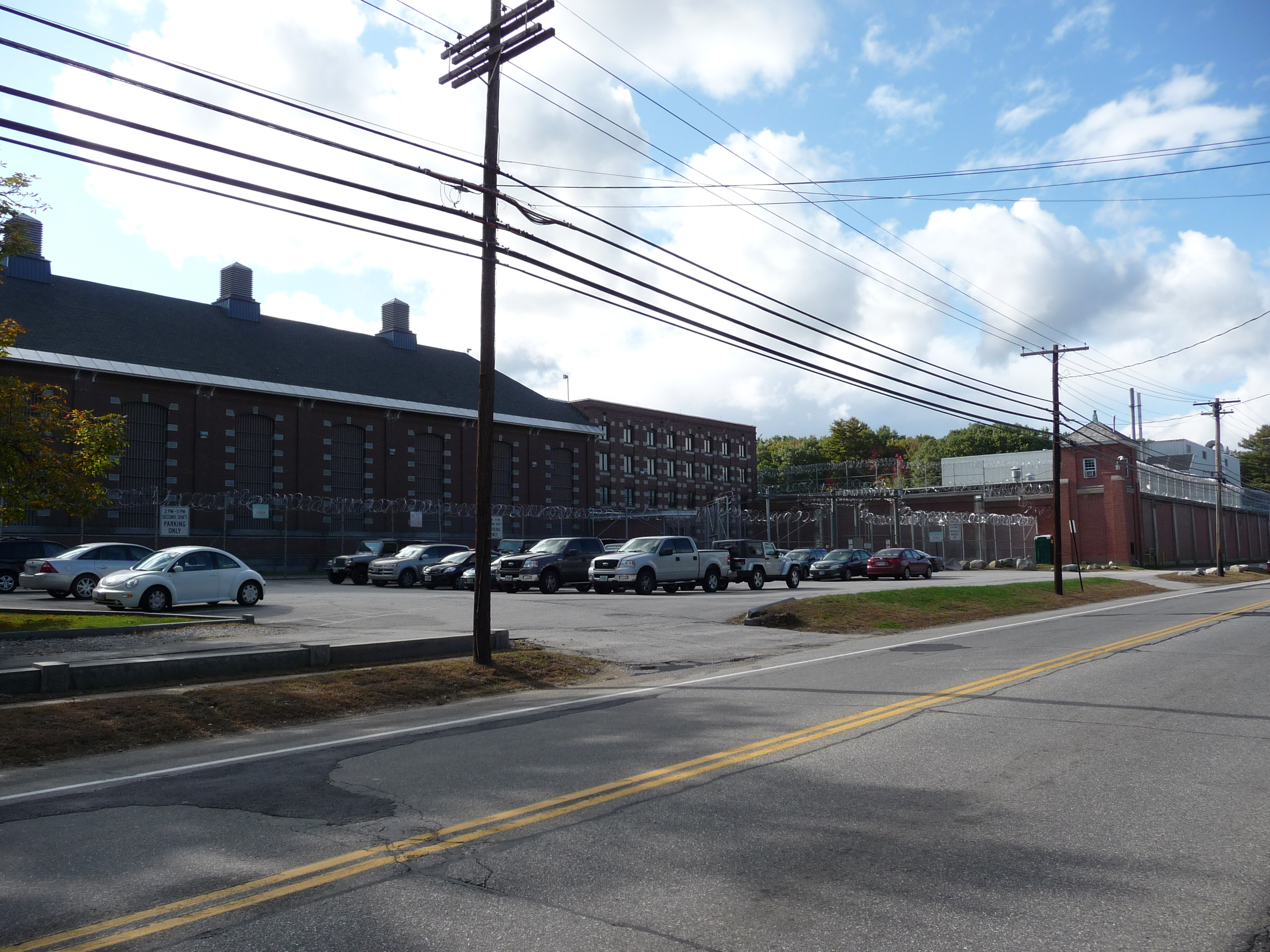

== See also ==
- New Hampshire State Prison for Women
