= Capital punishment in New Hampshire =

Capital punishment was abolished in 2019 in New Hampshire for persons convicted of capital murder. It remains a legal penalty for crimes committed prior to May 30, 2019.

On May 30, 2019, the New Hampshire Senate voted 16–8 to override Governor Chris Sununu's veto of House Bill 455, which changed the punishment of capital murder from capital punishment to life in prison. Earlier, on April 26, the New Hampshire House of Representatives had voted 247–123 to override the veto. In both chambers, the measure to override the governor's veto passed by a single vote to secure the two thirds majority required. New Hampshire was the last state in New England to allow capital punishment by law, and was the 21st state to abolish capital punishment.

The abolition of capital punishment did not affect Michael K. Addison, who was sentenced to death in 2008 for the 2006 murder of Michael Briggs, a Manchester police officer. Addison is the only person on death row in New Hampshire; the new law does not apply retroactively to his case.

The primary method was lethal injection, with hanging as a secondary method if lethal injection was deemed "impractical" by the State Commissioner of Corrections. New Hampshire (dating back to 1739, before it was a U.S. state) carried out 24 executions for capital punishment, most recently in July 1939, with the execution of Howard Long.

== Status prior to 2019 ==
=== Legal process ===
When the prosecution chose to seek the death penalty, the sentence was decided by the jury and had to be unanimous.

In the case of a hung jury during the penalty phase of the trial, a life sentence was issued, even if a single juror opposed death (there was no retrial).

The governor has the power of clemency with respect to death sentences, with advice of the executive council.

=== Capital murder ===
Capital murder was the only crime for which people, who were convicted prior to May 30, 2019, could be executed in the state. With the abolition of the death penalty on May 30, the death sentence was replaced by mandatory life in prison. A person is guilty of capital murder if they knowingly caused the death of:

1. A sheriff or deputy sheriff, state trooper, constable or police officer of a city or town, correctional officer, probation-parole officer, conservation officer, judge or similar person, state or local prosecutor acting in the line of duty or in retaliation for their job.
2. Another before, after, while engaged or attempting to commit a kidnapping.
3. Another after conspiring with a third to commit a contract killing.
4. Another after being sentenced to life imprisonment without parole.
5. Another before, after, while engaged or attempting to commit aggravated felonious sexual assault.
6. Another before, after, while engaged in the commission of, or while attempting to commit robbery.
7. Another before, after, while engaged or attempting to commit a drug offense.

Since the state's execution of Howard Long on July 14, 1939, eight people have been charged with capital murder. Three were convicted but received a mandatory life imprisonment without parole sentence. In three other cases, capital murder charges were resolved before trial, twice because the New Hampshire Supreme Court ruled the law authorizing the death penalty to be unconstitutional.

=== Methods ===
After a person was convicted of capital murder, a separate penalty phase was carried out using the same jury. The jury weighed a variety of aggravating and mitigating circumstances. If a person had been convicted of capital murder and was not sentenced to death, the mandatory sentence was life imprisonment without possibility of parole (LWOP), the same sentence as for first-degree murder.

Executions must be carried out no sooner than one year after the sentencing. Death row for men and the execution are at the New Hampshire State Prison for Men at Concord. According to state law:

The punishment of death shall be inflicted by continuous, intravenous administration of a lethal quantity of an ultrashort-acting barbiturate in combination with a chemical paralytic agent…

It was also possible for executions to be carried out by hanging. If it was found:

…to be impractical to carry out the punishment of death by administration of the required lethal substance or substances, the sentence of death may be carried out by hanging…

=== Public opinion ===
In a 2008 poll conducted for the Concord Monitor, 57 percent of likely voters supported the death penalty in police killing cases, 39 percent favored life in prison without parole, and 4 percent were unsure.

== Earlier history ==
From 1734 to 1939, 24 people were executed in the state for capital murder.

=== 1739–1942 ===
- In 1739, two women were the first convicts to be executed in the state, both convicted of "feloniously concealing the death of a ... infant bastard child". Provincial laws at the time required capital punishment for murder, rape, homosexual acts, abortion, bestiality, burglary, counterfeiting and treason.
- On May 8, 1755, Eliphaz Dow became the first man to be executed in New Hampshire. He was executed in Portsmouth for murder.
- In 1796, Thomas Powers, an African American, was hanged for rape. He was the first black person to be executed in the state.
- On January 3, 1822, Daniel Davis Farmer was hanged in Amherst for the murder of Ann Ayer in Goffstown in April 1821.
- In 1868, hangings were moved to the State Prison in Concord, after a riot followed the execution of Samuel Mills on the main street of Woodsville. Prior to the 1868 execution, hangings were carried out in public.
- In 1903, the punishment for murder in the first degree was changed from death, to death or imprisonment for life as the jury may determine... If the jury shall find the respondent guilty of murder in the first degree, the punishment shall be life imprisonment unless the jury shall add to their verdict the words, with capital punishment.
- In 1939, Howard Long, a storekeeper from Alton, Long was hanged at the New Hampshire State Prison in Concord on July 14, 1939, for molesting and fatally beating 10-year-old Mark Neville Jensen, from Laconia.
- In 1949, Ralph Jennings, a black man, was sentenced to be hanged for the murder of New Jersey nanny Ruth Eisenberg. Her body was found by hunters on a dirt road with panties shoved down her mouth along with a watch. Jennings was not executed but committed suicide in his cell by hanging himself. Jennings was convicted after a jury trial in Carroll County. The provided evidence insinuated it was a sex crime/homicide. The case became a national sensation and newspapers called Jennings a sex-murderer. Medical testimony stated the cause of death was asphyxiation.

=== Furman v. Georgia (1972) ===
In 1959, Frederick Martineau and Russell Nelson were convicted of murdering a businessman in a Nashua parking lot, who was scheduled to testify in a Rhode Island burglary case.

Martineau and Nelson received 13 stays of execution. They were spared the death penalty in 1972 when the United States Supreme Court ruled in Furman v. Georgia, 408 U.S. 238 (1972) that "unitary trial" procedure, in which the jury was asked to return a verdict of guilt or innocence and, simultaneously, determine whether the defendant would be punished by death or life imprisonment, was in violation of the Eighth Amendment to the United States Constitution.

=== 1970–present ===
- In 1971, the state legislature enacted RSA 630:1 Capital Murder. In 1977, RSA 630:1 III was amended by the legislature so that a person convicted of a capital murder "may" be punished by death, instead of "shall be" punished by death. In 1988, killing another after being sentenced to life imprisonment without parole pursuant was added to RSA 630:1. Also, probation-parole officer was added to the list of law enforcement officers contained in Paragraph II of the statute.
- In 1990, causing the death of another before, after, while engaged or attempting to commit aggravated felonious sexual assault, or an offense punishable under RSA 318-B:26, I(a) or (b) of the Controlled Drug Act was added as an aggravating element that might cause a crime to be classified as capital murder. In 1994, killing a "judicial officer" was added to the criteria for capital murder, and retaliation for a person's actions in the line of duty was added.
- In 1992, the New Hampshire State Prison dismantled its gallows.
- In 2000, Governor Jeanne Shaheen vetoed legislation to abolish the death penalty. The act had passed the House of Representatives 191-163 and the Senate 14–10. A two-thirds majority to overturn the veto was not achieved.
- In 2004, Governor Craig Benson vetoed legislation that would have raised the minimum age to execute someone from 17 to 18. Benson said:

When somebody, regardless of their age, is bold enough to take the life of a police officer, there should be no exceptions — we should make sure that they should pay the ultimate price. So I'm going to make a pledge as governor that if anyone takes the life of a police officer, I will seek the death penalty.

- In 2006, the statutory minimum age for a person punishable by death was raised from 17 to 18 years. The U.S. Supreme Court ruled in Roper v. Simmons (2005), that it is unconstitutional to impose the death penalty on people who were under age of 18 when they committed a capital crime. It noted that science has demonstrated the brains of minors are still unformed, and that it constituted "cruel and unusual punishment" to sentence them as adults.
- In 2009, Representative Stephen Linsey introduced House Bill 556, to repeal the death penalty. The bill was suggested "Inexpedient to Legislate" by the House Judicial Committee. It passed the House by a narrow margin, but failed to pass the Senate, where the vote was tied 12-12.
- In 2018, the New Hampshire State Senate and House both passed Senate Bill 593, which would prospectively abolish the death penalty but not apply retroactively to those already on death row. Governor Chris Sununu vetoed the bill on June 21, 2018, and an override attempt was defeated on September 13, 2018.
- In 2019, the New Hampshire State Senate and House passed another repeal bill, HB 455, this time with veto-proof majorities. Nevertheless, Governor Sununu again vetoed the bill on May 3, 2019. The veto was overridden on May 30, 2019. New Hampshire was the last New England state to outlaw the death penalty.

== See also ==
- List of people executed in New Hampshire
- List of death row inmates in the United States § New Hampshire
- Law of New Hampshire
