= Index of New Hampshire–related articles =

The location of the State of New Hampshire in the United States of America

The following is an alphabetical list of articles related to the U.S. State of New Hampshire.

== 0–9 ==
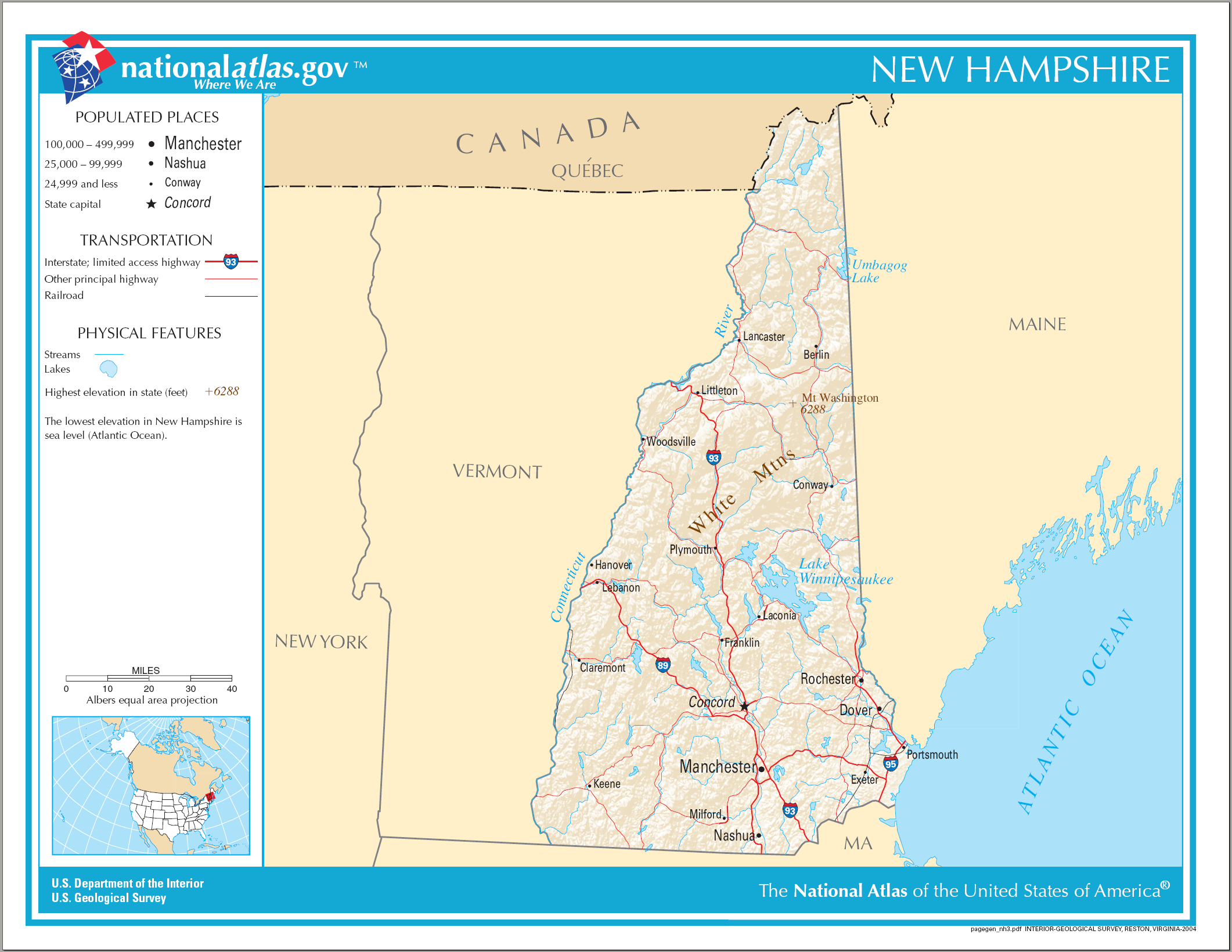
An enlargeable map of the State of New Hampshire

- .nh.us – Internet second-level domain for the state of New Hampshire
- 1st New Hampshire Volunteer Regiment
- 2nd New Hampshire Volunteer Regiment
- 3rd New Hampshire Volunteer Regiment
- 9th State to ratify the Constitution of the United States
- 14th New Hampshire Volunteer Regiment
- 45th parallel north
- 1940 New Hampshire earthquakes

== A ==
- Abortion in New Hampshire
- Adjacent states and province:
  - Commonwealth of Massachusetts
  - Province de Québec
  - State of Maine
  - State of Vermont
- Agriculture in New Hampshire
- Airports in New Hampshire
- Allen, Ethan
- Amusement parks in New Hampshire
- Appalachian Mountains
- Appalachian Mountain Club
- Appalachian Trail
- Arboreta in New Hampshire
  - commons:Category:Arboreta in New Hampshire
- Archaeology of New Hampshire
  - Category:Archaeological sites in New Hampshire
    - commons:Category:Archaeological sites in New Hampshire
- Architecture of New Hampshire
- Area codes in New Hampshire
- Art museums and galleries in New Hampshire
  - commons:Category:Art museums and galleries in New Hampshire
- Astronomical observatories in New Hampshire
  - commons:Category:Astronomical observatories in New Hampshire

== B ==
- Bedel's Regiment
- Boston-Cambridge-Quincy, MA-NH Metropolitan Statistical Area
- Boston-Worcester-Manchester, MA-RI-NH Combined Statistical Area
- Botanical gardens in New Hampshire
  - commons:Category:Botanical gardens in New Hampshire
- Buildings and structures in New Hampshire
  - commons:Category:Buildings and structures in New Hampshire

== C ==
- Capital of the State of New Hampshire
- Capital punishment in New Hampshire
- Capitol of the State of New Hampshire
- Caves of New Hampshire
  - commons:Category:Caves of New Hampshire
- Census statistical areas in New Hampshire
- Chase, Salmon P., Chief Justice of the U.S. Supreme Court
- Cities in New Hampshire
- Citizens Action for Southern New Hampshire
- Climate of New Hampshire
- Climate change in New Hampshire
- Cog railway
- Cohos Trail
- Colleges and universities in New Hampshire
- Colonial governors of New Hampshire
- Communications in New Hampshire
  - commons:Category:Communications in New Hampshire
- Concord, New Hampshire, state capital since 1808
- Connecticut Lakes

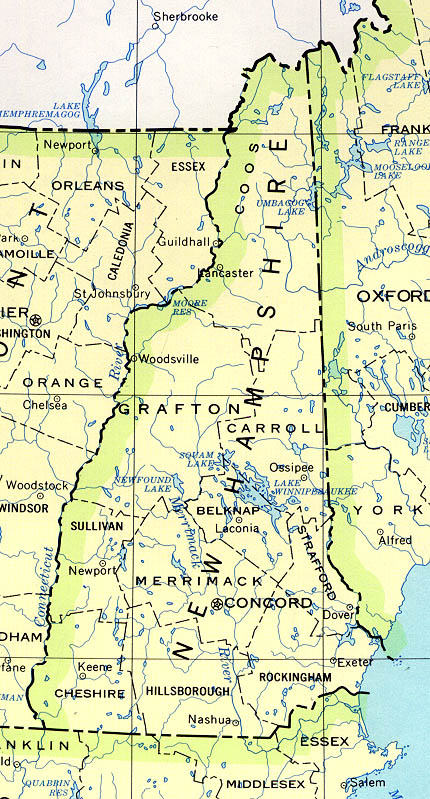
An enlargeable map of the 10 counties of the State of New Hampshire

- Constitution of the State of New Hampshire
- Counties of the State of New Hampshire
  - Belknap County
  - Carroll County
  - Cheshire County
  - Coos County
  - Grafton County
  - Hillsborough County
  - Merrimack County
  - Rockingham County
  - Strafford County
  - Sullivan County
  - commons:Category:Counties in New Hampshire
- County name etymologies
- Covered bridges of NH (List of)
- Crawford Notch
- Crawford Notch State Park
- Culture of New Hampshire
  - Category:Culture of New Hampshire
    - commons:Category:New Hampshire culture

== D ==
- Dartmouth College
- Defunct placenames of New Hampshire
- New Hampshire Democratic primary
- Demographics of New Hampshire
- New Hampshire Department of Justice
- New Hampshire Department of Safety
- New Hampshire Department of Transportation

== E ==
- Economy of New Hampshire
  - Category:Economy of New Hampshire
    - commons:Category:Economy of New Hampshire
- Education in New Hampshire
  - Category:Education in New Hampshire
    - commons:Category:Education in New Hampshire
- Elections in New Hampshire
  - Category:Elections in New Hampshire
    - commons:Category:Elections in New Hampshire
- Category:Environment of New Hampshire
  - commons:Category:Environment of New Hampshire
- Exeter, New Hampshire, capital of the revolutionary government 1775–1776, state capital 1776–1808

== F ==
The Flag of the State of New Hampshire

- Flag of the State of New Hampshire
- Forts in New Hampshire
  - Fort at Number 4
  - Fort Wentworth
  - Category:Forts in New Hampshire
    - commons:Category:Forts in New Hampshire
- Fourth Connecticut Lake
- Fourth Connecticut Lake Trail
- Free State Project

== G ==
The Great Seal of the State of New Hampshire

- New Hampshire General Court
- Geography of New Hampshire
  - Category:Geography of New Hampshire
    - commons:Category:Geography of New Hampshire
- Ghost towns in New Hampshire
  - Category:Ghost towns in New Hampshire
    - commons:Category:Ghost towns in New Hampshire
- Government of the state of New Hampshire website
  - Category:Government of New Hampshire
    - commons:Category:Government of New Hampshire
- Governor of the State of New Hampshire
  - List of governors of New Hampshire
  - List of colonial governors of New Hampshire
- Golf clubs and courses in New Hampshire
- New Hampshire Grants
- Great Seal of the State of New Hampshire
- Gun Owners of New Hampshire

== H ==
- Heritage railroads in New Hampshire
  - commons:Category:Heritage railroads in New Hampshire
- High Huts of the White Mountains
- High schools in New Hampshire
- Highway routes in New Hampshire
- Highway System of New Hampshire
- Hiking trails in New Hampshire
  - commons:Category:Hiking trails in C
- History of New Hampshire
  - Indigenous peoples
  - English Pannaway Plantation, since 1623
  - English Colony of Massachusetts Bay, 1628–1686
  - English Province of New-Hampshire, 1680–1686
  - English Dominion of New-England in America, 1686–1689
  - English Province of New-Hampshire, 1689–1707
  - British Province of New-Hampshire, 1707–1776
  - King George's War, 1740–1748
    - Treaty of Aix-la-Chapelle of 1748
  - French and Indian War, 1754–1763
    - Treaty of Paris of 1763
  - British Indian Reserve, 1763–1783
    - Royal Proclamation of 1763
  - American Revolutionary War, 1775–1783
    - United States Declaration of Independence of 1776
    - Treaty of Paris of 1783
  - State of New Hampshire, since 1776
    - War of 1812, 1812–1815
    - Republic of Indian Stream, 1832–1835
    - New Hampshire in the American Civil War, 1861–1865
  - Category:History of New Hampshire
    - commons:Category:History of New Hampshire
- Hospitals in New Hampshire

== I ==
- Images of New Hampshire
  - commons:Category:New Hampshire
- Indian Stream, Republic of. See also Pittsburg, NH.

== K ==
- Kancamagus Highway

== L ==
- Lakes in New Hampshire
  - Category:Lakes of New Hampshire
    - commons:Category:Lakes of New Hampshire
- Landmarks in New Hampshire
  - commons:Category:Landmarks in New Hampshire
- Law of New Hampshire
- Law enforcement agencies in New Hampshire
- LGBT rights in New Hampshire
- Lists related to the State of New Hampshire:
  - List of airports in New Hampshire
  - List of census statistical areas in New Hampshire
  - List of cities in New Hampshire
  - List of colleges and universities in New Hampshire
  - List of counties in New Hampshire
  - List of dams and reservoirs in New Hampshire
  - List of forts in New Hampshire
  - List of ghost towns in New Hampshire
  - List of governors of New Hampshire
  - List of high schools in New Hampshire
  - List of highway routes in New Hampshire
  - List of hospitals in New Hampshire
  - List of individuals executed in New Hampshire
  - List of lakes in New Hampshire
  - List of law enforcement agencies in New Hampshire
  - List of museums in New Hampshire
  - List of National Historic Landmarks in New Hampshire
  - List of newspapers in New Hampshire
  - List of people from New Hampshire
  - List of power stations in New Hampshire
  - List of radio stations in New Hampshire
  - List of railroads in New Hampshire
  - National Register of Historic Places listings in New Hampshire
  - List of rivers of New Hampshire
  - List of school districts in New Hampshire
  - List of state forests in New Hampshire
  - List of state parks in New Hampshire
  - List of state prisons in New Hampshire
  - List of symbols of the State of New Hampshire
  - List of telephone area codes in New Hampshire
  - List of television stations in New Hampshire
  - List of towns in New Hampshire
  - List of New Hampshire's congressional delegations
  - List of United States congressional districts in New Hampshire
  - List of United States representatives from New Hampshire
  - List of United States senators from New Hampshire
- Long's Regiment

== M ==
- Manchester, New Hampshire
  - List of mayors of Manchester, New Hampshire
- Maps of New Hampshire
  - commons:Category:Maps of New Hampshire
- Merrimack River see also List of New Hampshire rivers
- Motto of New Hampshire
- Moulton, Jonathan
- Mount Washington State Park
- Mountains of New Hampshire
  - Cannon Mountain
  - Carter Dome
  - Mount Adams
  - Mount Eisenhower
  - Mount Flume
  - Mount Jackson
  - Mount Jefferson
  - Mount Kelsey
  - Mount Lafayette
  - Mount Lincoln
  - Mount Madison
  - Mount Monadnock
  - Mount Monroe
  - Mount Moosilauke
  - Mount Osceola
  - Mount Quincy Adams
  - Mount Washington
  - South Twin Mountain
  - Category:Mountains of New Hampshire
  - commons:Category:Mountains of New Hampshire
- Museums in New Hampshire
  - Category:Museums in New Hampshire
    - commons:Category:Museums in New Hampshire
- Music of New Hampshire
  - commons:Category:Music of New Hampshire
  - Category:Musical groups from New Hampshire
  - Category:Musicians from New Hampshire

== N ==
- National forests of New Hampshire
  - commons:Category:National Forests of New Hampshire
- National Historic Landmarks in New Hampshire
- Natural history of New Hampshire
  - commons:Category:Natural history of New Hampshire
- Nature centers in New Hampshire
  - commons:Category:Nature centers in New Hampshire
- New England
- New Hampshire website
  - Category:New Hampshire
    - commons:Category:New Hampshire
- New Hampshire Academy of Science
- New Hampshire Gay Men's Chorus
- New Hampshire Militia
- New Hampshire Snowmobile Association
- New Hampshire State House
- New Hampshire State Police
- New Hampshire Wildlife Federation
- New Hampshire's 1st State Senate District
- New Hampshire's 15th State Senate District
- New Hampshire's 22nd State Senate District
- Newspapers in New Hampshire
- NH – United States Postal Service postal code for the State of New Hampshire
- Noyes Academy

== O ==
- Old Man of the Mountain
- Our Last Night

== P ==
- List of New Hampshire state parks
- People from New Hampshire
  - Category:People from New Hampshire
    - commons:Category:People from New Hampshire
    - Category:People from New Hampshire by populated place
    - Category:People from New Hampshire by county
    - Category:People from New Hampshire by occupation
- Pinkham Notch
- List of New Hampshire places
- List of place names in New England of aboriginal origin
- Politics of New Hampshire
  - Category:Politics of New Hampshire
    - commons:Category:Politics of New Hampshire
- Portsmouth, New Hampshire, capital of the Province of New-Hampshire 1680-1686 and 1689–1775
- Presidential Range
- New Hampshire primary
- Prisons (state)
- Protected areas of New Hampshire
  - commons:Category:Protected areas of New Hampshire
- Province of New Hampshire (colonial)

== R ==
- Radio stations in New Hampshire
- Railroads in New Hampshire
- Regions of New Hampshire: See list of links in box below.
- Religion in New Hampshire
  - Category:Religion in New Hampshire
    - commons:Category:Religion in New Hampshire
- Republic of Indian Stream
- New Hampshire Retirement System
- Rivers in New Hampshire
- Rivier University
- Rock formations in New Hampshire
  - commons:Category:Rock formations in New Hampshire
- Roller coasters in New Hampshire
  - commons:Category:Roller coasters in New Hampshire

== S ==
- School districts in New Hampshire
- Scouting in New Hampshire
- Settlements in New Hampshire
  - List of Towns in New Hampshire
  - Cities in New Hampshire
  - Townships in New Hampshire
  - Census Designated Places in New Hampshire
  - Other unincorporated communities in New Hampshire
  - List of ghost towns in New Hampshire
- Ski areas and resorts in New Hampshire
  - commons:Category:Ski areas and resorts in New Hampshire
- Solar power in New Hampshire
- Sports in New Hampshire
  - commons:Category:Sports in New Hampshire
- Sports venues in New Hampshire
  - commons:Category:Sports venues in New Hampshire
- State forests in New Hampshire
- State of New Hampshire website
  - Government of the State of New Hampshire
    - Category:Government of New Hampshire
      - commons:Category:Government of New Hampshire
  - Vermont v. New Hampshire
- State parks in New Hampshire
- State Police of New Hampshire
- State prisons in New Hampshire
- Structures in New Hampshire
  - commons:Category:Buildings and structures in New Hampshire
- New Hampshire Superior Court
- New Hampshire Supreme Court
- Symbols of the State of New Hampshire
  - Category:Symbols of New Hampshire
    - commons:Category:Symbols of New Hampshire

== T ==
- Telecommunications in New Hampshire
  - commons:Category:Communications in New Hampshire
- Telephone area codes in New Hampshire
- Television stations in New Hampshire
- Theatres in New Hampshire
  - commons:Category:Theatres in New Hampshire
- Tourism in New Hampshire website
  - commons:Category:Tourism in New Hampshire
- Towns in New Hampshire
- Towns in New Hampshire
- Transportation in New Hampshire
  - Category:Transportation in New Hampshire
    - commons:Category:Transport in New Hampshire
- Tuckerman Ravine

== U ==
- United States of America
  - States of the United States of America
  - United States census statistical areas of New Hampshire
  - New Hampshire's congressional delegations
  - United States congressional districts in New Hampshire
  - United States Court of Appeals for the First Circuit
  - United States District Court for the District of New Hampshire
  - United States representatives from New Hampshire
  - United States senators from New Hampshire
- Universities and colleges in New Hampshire
- University of New Hampshire
- University System of New Hampshire
- US-NH – ISO 3166-2:US region code for the State of New Hampshire

== W ==
- Water parks in New Hampshire
- Waterfalls of New Hampshire
  - commons:Category:Waterfalls of New Hampshire
- Whitcomb's Rangers
- White Mountain National Forest
- White Mountains (New Hampshire)
  Wikimedia
  - Wikimedia Commons:Category:New Hampshire
    - commons:Category:Maps of New Hampshire
  - Wikinews:Category:New Hampshire
    - Wikinews:Portal:New Hampshire
  - Wikipedia Category:New Hampshire
    - Wikipedia:WikiProject New Hampshire
      - Category:WikiProject New Hampshire articles
      - Wikipedia:WikiProject New Hampshire#Participants
- Wind power in New Hampshire
- Lake Winnipesaukee

== See also ==
- Topic overview:
  - New Hampshire
  - Outline of New Hampshire
