= 2023–2024 New Hampshire state legislative special elections =

In 2023, various special elections were held throughout the year in New Hampshire, mostly to the state's House of Representatives. At 400 members, the state house is the largest state legislative body in the United States, and the fourth largest lower house in the English-speaking world. As members are only paid $100 per year plus travel costs, turnover tends to be frequent, as members resign or die mid-term, resulting in a special election to replace them. According to the Constitution of the State of New Hampshire, if there is a vacancy in the New Hampshire General Court, a special election must be called to fill the vacant seat within 21 days of receiving proof of a vacancy or a request that a vacancy be filled.

In the 2022 State House election, Republicans won 201 seats, Democrats won 198, and one seat resulted in a tie. The closeness of the result attracted additional attention to the special elections, as it raised the probability of a mid-session flip.

The special elections were largely marked by strong overperformances by the New Hampshire Democratic Party. Democrat Chuck Grassie won a special election in February to a seat that had tied the previous November, and Democrat Hal Rafter won a Republican-held seat in September.

== State House district Strafford 8 ==
New Hampshire House District Strafford 8 Special Election
- February 21, 2023
| Candidate | Chuck Grassie | David Walker |
| Party | Democratic | Republican |
| Popular vote | 568 | 451 |
| Percentage | 55.7% | 44.3% |

The November 2022 election to this seat in the city of Rochester ended in a tie of 970-970 between Democrat Chuck Grassie and Republican David Walker. Despite rumors that the Republican-controlled state House would vote to seat Walker anyways, a special election was called for February 21.

This race was notable for a race receiving national attention due to the small size of the district; both candidates live on the same street within half a mile of each other. Walker based his campaign of combatting the 2021-23 inflation increase and what he described as “reckless spending” from Democrats. Grassie, a prominent progressive in the New Hampshire legislature, focused on marijuana decriminalization and tax relief.

Democrats heavily outspent Republicans in the election, with national groups such as the Democratic Legislative Campaign Committee pouring money into the race in the hopes of a mid-session flip of the state house similar to what happened in the Washington State Senate in 2017.

The eastern New Hampshire district voted 51%-47%for Democrat Joe Biden in 2020. In the end, Chuck Grassie won with over 55% of the vote, a 4% over-performance for Democrats.

== First election to State House district Hillsborough 3 ==
New Hampshire House District Hillsborough 3 Special Election
- May 16, 2023
| Candidate | Marc Plamondon | David Narkunas |
| Party | Democratic | Republican |
| Popular vote | 151 | 60 |
| Percentage | 71.6% | 28.4% |

This is a multi-member district in the city of Nashua. One of the representatives, Democrat Stacie-Marie Laughton, was arrested on November 12, 2022, shortly after winning re-election. She was charged with one charge of stalking and violating a court order. She resigned on December 22, 2022.

A special election to replace her was scheduled in January 2023. Democrat Marc Plamondon and Republicans Joost Baumeister and David M. Narkunas filed to run. A primary was held on March 28, where Narkunas defeated Baumeister. Only 22 people voted in the Republican primary, with Narkunas winning 13–9. Meanwhile, 39 people voted for Plamondon, who was running unopposed in the Democratic primary.

The general election for this 63%-35% Biden seat was held on May 16. In another low-turnout election, Plamondon defeated Narkunas with almost 72% of the vote, a 9-point over performance for Democrats.

== State House district Grafton 16 ==
New Hampshire House District Grafton 16 Special Election
- August 22, 2023
| Candidate | David Fracht | John Keane |
| Party | Democratic | Republican |
| Popular vote | 495 | 194 |
| Percentage | 71.8% | 28.2% |

Democratic representative Joshua Adjutant resigned on April 1, 2023, after receiving a head injury while working as a security guard. In an effort to ensure that Democrats could quickly retake the seat representing the town of Enfield, he resigned immediately.

During the filing period from June 19–23, Democrat David Fracht and Republican John Keane were the only candidates who filed to run. Due to this, no primary was held, and the special election was held on August 22, 2023.

This seat voted for Biden by a margin of 64%-33%. As Fracht won with almost 72% of the vote, this was an 8-point over performance for Democrats.

== State House district Rockingham 1 ==
New Hampshire House District Rockingham 1 Special Election
- September 19, 2023
| Candidate | Hal Rafter | James Guzofski |
| Party | Democratic | Republican |
| Popular vote | 1571 | 1240 |
| Percentage | 55.9% | 44.1% |

Republican representative Benjamin Bartlett resigned on April 26, 2023, for health reasons after missing over 130 votes due to illness.

After two Republicans, James Guzofski and Jessica Sternberg, filed to run, a primary election was held on August 1. Guzofski won by a margin of 230–184. Meanwhile, Democrat Hal Rafter won his party's nomination with 245 votes while unopposed.

Following his nomination, Gozofski came under fire for previous comments claiming that abortion-rights activists were making blood sacrifices to Molech and claiming that the COVID-vaccine was "literally infecting people with the virus."

The district, representing the towns of Northwood and Nottingham, is highly competitive, voting for Trump by less than 0.5% in 2020. Democrats invested a sizeable amount of money in an attempt to flip this seat. In the end, Rafter and outspent Guzofski by a margin of $46,000 to less than $500, and easily won the race by a margin of 11.8%, an 11.4% Democratic overperformance.

The race garnered national attention, with Newsweek calling it a "warning sign for Trump" and FiveThirtyEight remarking on how it continued an "impressive streak" of Democratic overperformances in special elections.

The election put the New Hampshire House on track to become an exact tie between Democrats and Republicans by the second Hillsborough 3 election in November until Democratic representative Maria Perez switched to independent on October 2.

== Second election to State House district Hillsborough 3 ==
New Hampshire House District Hillsborough 3 Special Election
- November 7, 2023
| Candidate | Paige Beauchemin | David Narkunas |
| Party | Democratic | Republican |
| Popular vote | 409 | 265 |
| Percentage | 60.68% | 39.32% |

Democrat David Cote easily won the November election to be one of the members in this multi-member seat in the city of Nashua, but had been unable to serve for health reasons since March 2020. As such, Republicans refused to seat him, making his seat technically vacant. That action was the subject of lawsuits under the Americans with Disabilities Act. After several months in limbo, Cote resigned on July 5, 2023.

The filing deadline was July 28, 2023. Democrat Paige Beauchemin and Republicans Joost Baumeister and David M. Narkunas, both of whom had run in the previous election in May, filed to run. A primary was held on September 19, 2023. Narkunas again defeated Baumeister in a low turnout election, this time by a margin of 41 votes to 12 votes. Beauchemin received 84 votes and was the Democratic nominee.

The general election was held November 7, 2023. Beauchmin defeated Narkunas, but with about 3% of the vote less than Joe Biden had gotten in 2020, the first Republican overperformance in this series of elections.

== Coos County district 6 ==
New Hampshire House District Coos 6 Special Election
- January 23, 2024
| Candidate | Michael Murphy | Edith Tucker |
| Party | Republican | Democratic |
| Popular vote | 750 | 643 |
| Percentage | 53.8% | 46.2% |

Democrat William Hatch resigned on September 18, 2023, due to health issues.

A special election to replace him was held on January 23, 2024, concurrently with the election to Coos County District 1, as well as the Democratic and Republican presidential primaries. The primary was held on December 5, and Democrat Edith Tucker and Republicans Don Lacasse and Michael Murphy filed to run. Tucker won the primary unopposed, while Murphy defeated Lacasse by a margin of 73 votes to 48.

The district represents the towns of Gorham, Randolph, and Shelburne, and voted for Biden by a margin of 8.1%.

In January 2024, Murphy defeated Tucker in the special general election, winning 53 percent of the vote. As of 2026, it is the last time the Republicans flipped any state legislative seat in the US during a special election.

== Coos County district 1 ==
New Hampshire House District Coos 1 Special Election
- January 23, 2024
| Candidate | Sean C. Durkin | Cathleen Fountain |
| Party | Republican | Democratic |
| Popular vote | 1,289 | 851 |
| Percentage | 60.2% | 39.8% |

Republican Troy Merner resigned on September 19, 2023, after moving out of his district. A special election to replace him was be held on January 23, 2024.

In the primary, which was held on December 5, 2023, Democrat Cathleen Fountain and Republicans Sean Durkin and Pamela Kathan filed to run. Fountain won the election unopposed, while Durkin defeated Kathan by a margin of 122 votes to 57.

The district represents the towns of Lancaster, Northumberland, Dalton, and Stratford, and voted for Trump by a margin of 12.2%.

== Strafford County district 11 ==
Democrat Hoy Menear died on November 13, 2023. A special election to replace him was held on March 12, 2024, with the primary on January 23, 2024. Democrats Erik Johnson and Jeffrey Salloway, as well as Republican Joseph E. Bazo, filed to run. The district voted for Biden by a margin of 20.1%.

== Rockingham County district 21 ==
Democrat Robin Vogt resigned on December 1, 2023, after moving out of his district. A special election to replace him was held on March 12, 2024, with the primary on January 23, 2024. Democrats Jacqueline Cali-Pitts and Jennifer Mandelbaum filed to run, while no Republican filed. This district voted for Biden by a margin of 35.3%.
