= Outline of New Hampshire =

Overview of and topical guide to New Hampshire

The flag of New Hampshire

The seal of New Hampshire

The location of the state of New Hampshire in the United States of America

The following outline is provided as an overview of and topical guide to the U.S. state of New Hampshire:

New Hampshire – U.S. state in the New England region of the United States of America, named after the southern English county of Hampshire. It was one of the original thirteen states that founded the U.S.

== General reference ==
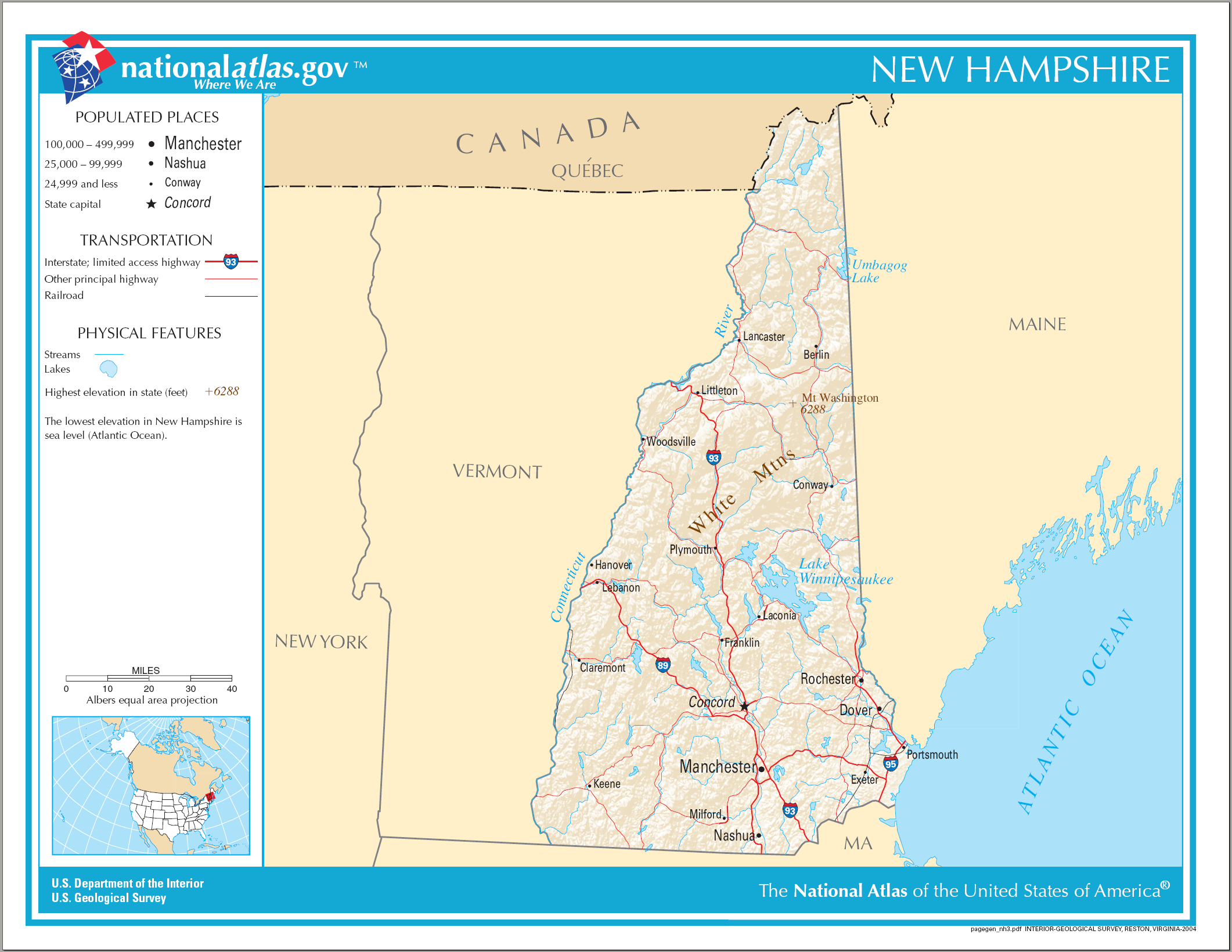
An enlargeable map of the state of New Hampshire

- Names
  - Common name: New Hampshire
  - Official name: State of New Hampshire
  - Abbreviations and name codes
    - Postal symbol: NH
    - ISO 3166-2 code: US-NH
    - Internet second-level domain: .nh.us
  - Nicknames
    - Granite State
    - White Mountain State
- Adjectival: New Hampshire
- Demonym: New Hampshirite

== Geography of New Hampshire ==
Geography of New Hampshire

- New Hampshire is: a U.S. state, a federal state of the United States of America
- Location:
  - Northern Hemisphere
  - Western Hemisphere
    - Americas
      - North America
        - Anglo America
        - Northern America
          - United States of America
            - Contiguous United States
              - Canada–US border
              - Eastern United States
                - East Coast of the United States
                  - Northeastern United States
                    - New England
- Population of New Hampshire: 1,316,470 (2010 U.S. Census)
- Area of New Hampshire: 9,350 sq mi (24,216 km^{2})
- Atlas of New Hampshire

=== Places in New Hampshire ===
- Historic places in New Hampshire
  - National Historic Landmarks in New Hampshire
  - National Register of Historic Places listings in New Hampshire
    - Bridges on the National Register of Historic Places in New Hampshire
- National Natural Landmarks in New Hampshire
- National parks in New Hampshire
- State parks in New Hampshire

=== Environment of New Hampshire ===
- Climate of New Hampshire
- Protected areas in New Hampshire
  - State forests of New Hampshire
- Superfund sites in New Hampshire

==== Natural geographic features of New Hampshire ====
- Islands of New Hampshire
- Lakes of New Hampshire
- Mountains of New Hampshire
- Rivers of New Hampshire

=== Regions of New Hampshire ===
- Central New Hampshire (Lakes Region)
- Northern New Hampshire
  - Great North Woods Region
  - White Mountains Region
- Southern New Hampshire
  - Merrimack Valley Region
    - Golden Triangle (New Hampshire)
  - Southeastern New Hampshire (Seacoast Region)
  - Southwestern New Hampshire (Monadnock Region)
- Western New Hampshire (Dartmouth-Lake Sunapee Region)
  - Upper Valley

==== Administrative divisions of New Hampshire ====
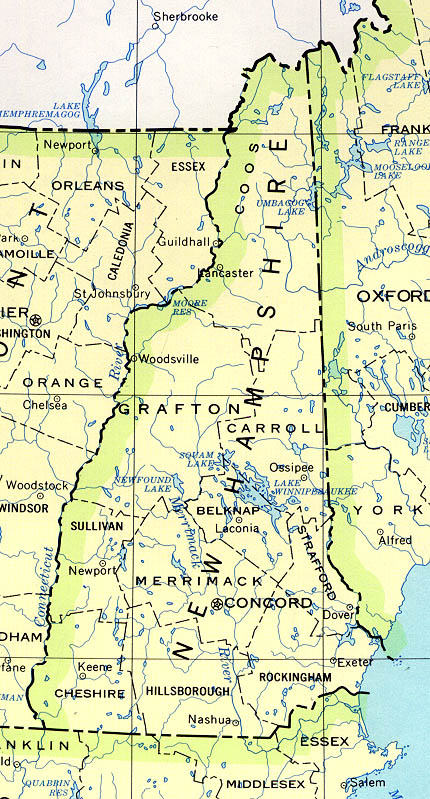
An enlargeable map of the 10 counties of the state of New Hampshire

- The 10 counties of the state of New Hampshire
  - Municipalities in New Hampshire
    - Cities in New Hampshire
      - State capital of New Hampshire: Concord
      - City nicknames in New Hampshire
    - Towns in New Hampshire

=== Demography of New Hampshire ===
Demographics of New Hampshire

== Government and politics of New Hampshire ==
Politics of New Hampshire

- Form of government: U.S. state government
- New Hampshire's congressional delegations
- New Hampshire State Capitol
- Elections in New Hampshire
- Political party strength in New Hampshire

=== Branches of the government of New Hampshire ===
Government of New Hampshire

==== Executive branch of the government of New Hampshire ====
- Governor of New Hampshire
  - Lieutenant Governor of New Hampshire
  - Secretary of State of New Hampshire
- State departments
  - New Hampshire Department of Transportation

==== Legislative branch of the government of New Hampshire ====
- New Hampshire General Court (bicameral)
  - Upper house: New Hampshire Senate
  - Lower house: New Hampshire House of Representatives

==== Judicial branch of the government of New Hampshire ====
Courts of New Hampshire

- Supreme Court of New Hampshire

=== Law and order in New Hampshire ===
Law of New Hampshire

- Cannabis in New Hampshire
- Capital punishment in New Hampshire
  - Individuals executed in New Hampshire
- Constitution of New Hampshire
- Crime in New Hampshire
- Gun laws in New Hampshire
- Law enforcement in New Hampshire
  - Law enforcement agencies in New Hampshire
    - New Hampshire State Police
- Same-sex marriage in New Hampshire

=== Military in New Hampshire ===
- New Hampshire Air National Guard
- New Hampshire Army National Guard

=== Local government in New Hampshire ===
Local government in New Hampshire

== History of New Hampshire ==
History of New Hampshire

=== History of New Hampshire, by period ===
- Prehistory of New Hampshire
- Indigenous peoples
- English Pannaway Plantation, 1623
- English Colony of Massachusetts Bay, 1628–1686
- English Province of New-Hampshire, 1680–1686
- English Dominion of New-England in America, 1686–1689
- English Province of New-Hampshire, 1689–1707
- British Province of New-Hampshire, 1707–1776
- King George's War, 1740–1748
  - Treaty of Aix-la-Chapelle of 1748
- French and Indian War, 1754–1763
  - Treaty of Paris of 1763
- British Indian Reserve, 1763–1783
  - Royal Proclamation of 1763
- American Revolutionary War, April 19, 1775 – September 3, 1783
  - Treaty of Paris, September 3, 1783
- State of New Hampshire, since 1776
    - Adopts constitution for an independent State of New Hampshire, January 5, 1776
  - United States Declaration of Independence, July 4, 1776
    - Seventh state to ratify the Articles of Confederation and Perpetual Union, signed July 9, 1778
  - Ninth State to ratify the Constitution of the United States of America on June 21, 1788
  - War of 1812, June 18, 1812 – March 23, 1815
    - Treaty of Ghent, December 24, 1814
  - Republic of Indian Stream, 1832–1835
  - Mexican–American War, April 25, 1846 – February 2, 1848
  - Franklin Pierce becomes 14th President of the United States on March 4, 1853
  - American Civil War, April 12, 1861 – May 13, 1865
    - New Hampshire in the American Civil War

=== History of New Hampshire, by region ===
- By city
  - History of Concord, New Hampshire
  - History of Goffstown, New Hampshire
  - History of Hanover, New Hampshire
  - History of Portsmouth, New Hampshire

=== History of New Hampshire, by subject ===
- Cannabis in New Hampshire
- History of capital punishment in New Hampshire
- History of education in New Hampshire
  - History of the University of New Hampshire
- List of New Hampshire state legislatures

== Culture of New Hampshire ==
Culture of New Hampshire

- Cuisine of New Hampshire
- Museums in New Hampshire
- Religion in New Hampshire
  - Episcopal Diocese of New Hampshire
  - Roman Catholic Diocese of Manchester
- Scouting in New Hampshire
- State symbols of New Hampshire
  - Flag of the state of New Hampshire
  - Great Seal of the State of New Hampshire

=== The arts in New Hampshire ===
- Music of New Hampshire

=== Sports in New Hampshire ===
Sports in New Hampshire

== Economy and infrastructure of New Hampshire ==
Economy of New Hampshire

- Communications in New Hampshire
  - Newspapers in New Hampshire
  - Radio stations in New Hampshire
  - Television stations in New Hampshire
- Energy in New Hampshire
  - List of power stations in New Hampshire
  - Solar power in New Hampshire
  - Wind power in New Hampshire
- Health care in New Hampshire
  - Hospitals in New Hampshire
- Transportation in New Hampshire
  - Airports in New Hampshire
  - Roads in New Hampshire
    - State highways in New Hampshire

== Education in New Hampshire ==
Education in New Hampshire

- Schools in New Hampshire
  - School districts in New Hampshire
    - High schools in New Hampshire
  - Colleges and universities in New Hampshire
    - University of New Hampshire

== See also ==
- Topic overview:
  - New Hampshire
  - Index of New Hampshire-related articles
