= 2023 in New Hampshire =

- Decades: 2000s; 2010s; 2020s
- See also: History of New Hampshire; Historical outline of New Hampshire; List of years in New Hampshire; 2023 in the United States

The following is a list of events of the year 2023 in New Hampshire.

== Incumbents ==
=== State government ===
- Governor: Chris Sununu (R)

== Events ==
- February 4 – Mount Washington records the lowest wind chill temperature in the country at −108 °F (−78 °C).
- February 21 – 2023–2024 New Hampshire state legislative special elections.
- April 27 – One person is injured after multiple bombings in Weare.
