= 2026 in New Hampshire =

- Decades: 2000s; 2010s; 2020s
- See also: History of New Hampshire; Historical outline of New Hampshire; List of years in New Hampshire; 2026 in the United States

The following is a list of events of the year 2026 in New Hampshire.

== Incumbents ==
=== State government ===
- Governor: Kelly Ayotte (R)

== Events ==
- February 22 – A Border Patrol agent injures a suspect in a shoot-out near the Canadian border crossing in Pittsburg.
- May 25 – The Libertarian National Committee votes 15–2 to remove the Libertarian Party of New Hampshire from its affiliation with the national party.
- June 11 – The New Hampshire Supreme Court reverses the murder conviction of Adam Montgomery, who was convicted of killing his daughter Harmony. The court sides with Montgomery's argument that an assault charge should have been tried separately from the murder charge. The murder conviction is the only one reversed; others remain in place.
- November 3 – 2026 New Hampshire elections:
  - 2026 New Hampshire gubernatorial election: Kelly Ayotte wins reelection.
  - 2026 New Hampshire House of Representatives election
  - 2026 New Hampshire Senate election
  - 2026 United States House of Representatives elections in New Hampshire
  - 2026 United States Senate election in New Hampshire: Representative Chris Pappas beats former Senator John E. Sununu in the election. Pappas is the first openly gay man elected to the U.S. Senate.
- November 5 – A federal judge rules in favor of two men who were banned from their daughters' high school soccer games for wearing pink wristbands with "XX" stitched on them, worn in response to an opposing team having a transgender player on it.

== See also ==
- 2026 in the United States
