= 2024 in New Hampshire =

- Decades: 2000s; 2010s; 2020s
- See also: History of New Hampshire; Historical outline of New Hampshire; List of years in New Hampshire; 2024 in the United States

The following is a list of events of the year 2024 in New Hampshire.

== Incumbents ==
=== State government ===
- Governor: Chris Sununu (R)

== Events ==
- January 23 –
  - 2024 Democratic Party presidential primaries:The 2024 New Hampshire Democratic presidential primary is held. Joe Biden's name does not appear on the ballot due to a scheduling dispute between the Democratic National Committee and the state government.
  - 2024 Republican Party presidential primaries: The 2024 New Hampshire Republican presidential primary is held. Former president Donald Trump wins.
- March 10 – One skier is killed and two others are injured after falling on Mount Washington.
- May 1 – Police arrest 98 pro-Palestinian protesters at Dartmouth College and 12 at the University of New Hampshire.
- November 5 – 2024 United States presidential election in New Hampshire

== See also ==
- 2024 in the United States
