= 2025 in New Hampshire =

- Decades: 2000s; 2010s; 2020s
- See also: History of New Hampshire; Historical outline of New Hampshire; List of years in New Hampshire; 2025 in the United States

The following is a list of events of the year 2025 in New Hampshire.

== Incumbents ==
=== State government ===
- Governor: Chris Sununu (R) January 1–9

Kelly Ayotte January 9-

== Events ==
- March 3 – A Concord teachers' union sues the Trump administration over its DEI Ban
- May 19 – A federal court rules the town of Conway violated bakery owner Sean Young's first amendment rights when they ordered him to remove a painting of pastries located above his business. Painted by local high schoolers, the town had determined it was advertising, not art, and thus violated local sign code due to its size.
- June 13 – Political consultant Steven Kramer is found not guilty of voter suppression and impersonating a candidate. Prior to the 2024 New Hampshire Democratic presidential primary, Kramer had paid a New Orleans-based magician to create an AI-generated deepfake that sounded like Joe Biden saying that voters should "save" their primary vote for the November election, which Kramer then distributed via robocalls. Kramer's defense argued the voter suppression law did not apply to the primary, and that there was no candidate impersonation because Biden's name was not mentioned, and he was not officially on the ballot.
- August 1 – New Hampshire bans gender affirming care for minors.
- September 20 – One person is killed and two injured in a shooting at a country club in Nashua during a wedding.

== See also ==
- 2025 in the United States
