= Lebanon–Claremont micropolitan area =

Human settlement in United States of America

Coordinates: 43°30′N 72°20′W

Lebanon–Claremont, NH Lebanon–Claremont, NH–VT Micropolitan Statistical Area
- Micropolitan Statistical Area
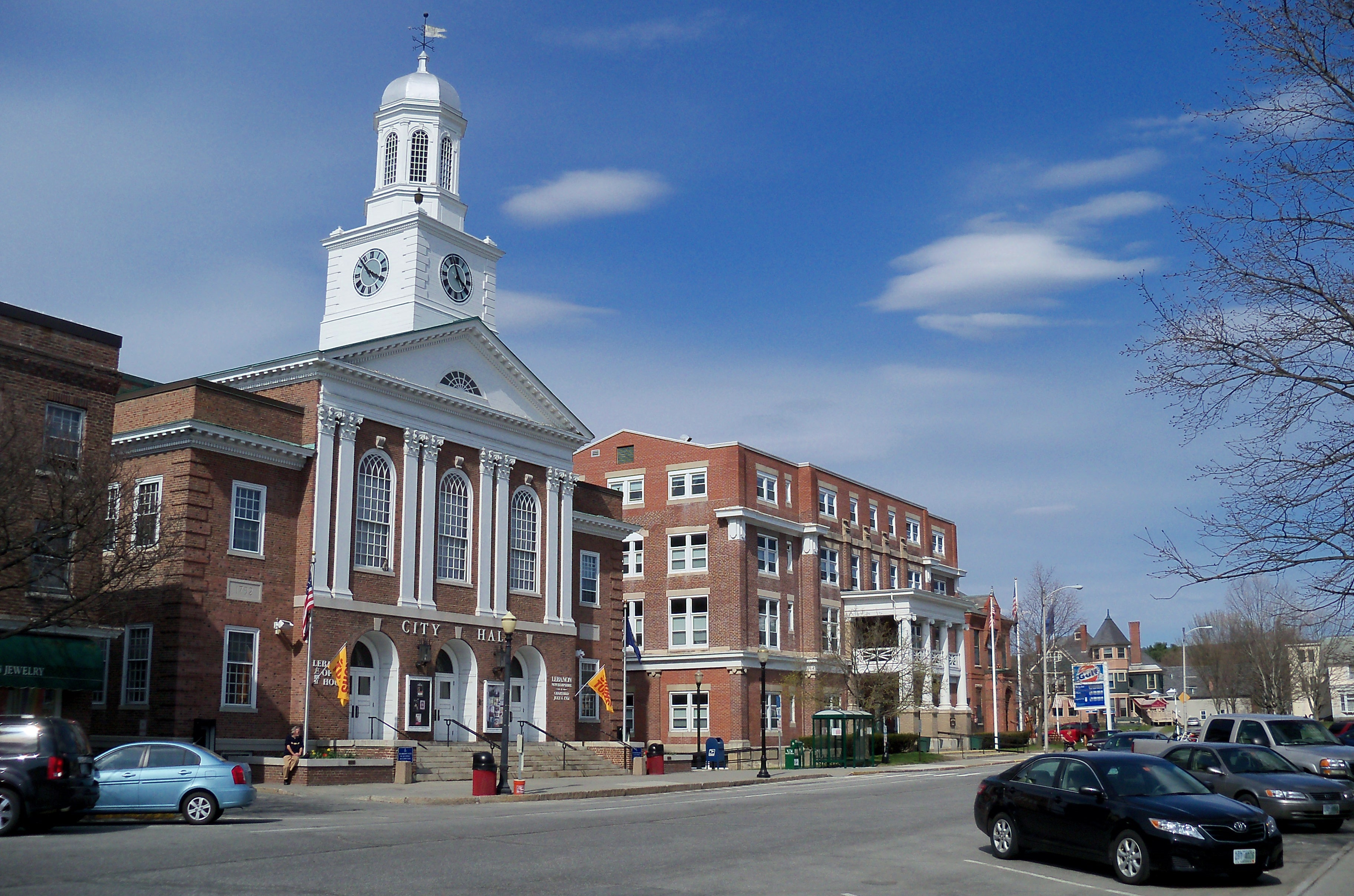
- Buildings along Park Street in downtown Lebanon
Map of Lebanon–Claremont, NH–VT μSA
City of Lebanon
City of Claremont
Lebanon–Claremont, NH–VT μSA
- Country: United States
- State: New Hampshire; Vermont
- Principal cities: Lebanon; Claremont
- Time zone: UTC−5 (EST)
  - Summer (DST): UTC−4 (EDT)

The Lebanon–Claremont Micropolitan Statistical Area, as defined by the United States Census Bureau, is an area consisting of four counties – two in New Hampshire and two in Vermont, anchored by the cities of Lebanon, New Hampshire and Claremont, New Hampshire. At the 2010 census, the area was defined as two separate Micropolitan Statistical Areas (μSAs), Claremont and Lebanon. The Claremont μSA, consisting of Sullivan County, New Hampshire, had a population of 43,742, while the Lebanon μSA, comprising Grafton County, New Hampshire, and Orange and Windsor counties in Vermont, had a population of 174,724. In 2013, the two areas were combined to form the Claremont-Lebanon μSA, and in 2015 the estimated population was 216,923. The Claremont–Lebanon μSA was the most populous micropolitan area in the United States c.2010—2015 but has since been surpassed by the Seaford, Delaware micropolitan area.

== Counties ==
- Grafton County, New Hampshire
- Sullivan County, New Hampshire
- Orange County, Vermont
- Windsor County, Vermont

== Demographics ==
As of the census of 2000, there were 167,387 people, 66,696 households, and 43,594 families residing within the Lebanon μSA. The racial makeup of the μSA was 96.81% White, 0.41% African American, 0.28% Native American, 1.12% Asian, 0.03% Pacific Islander, 0.26% from other races, and 1.09% from two or more races. Hispanic or Latino of any race were 0.92% of the population.

The median income for a household in the μSA was $40,835, and the median income for a family was $51,732. Males had a median income of $35,067 versus $25,042 for females. The per capita income for the μSA was $21,127.

== See also ==
- New Hampshire statistical areas
- Vermont statistical areas
