= New Hampshire Police Standards and Training Council =

Government agency in the U.S. state of New Hampshire

New Hampshire Police Standards and Training Council (PSTC)

Agency overview
- Formed: 1971
- Jurisdiction: New Hampshire
- Headquarters: 17 Institute Drive Concord, New Hampshire
- Agency executive: John Scippa, Director
- Website: www.pstc.nh.gov

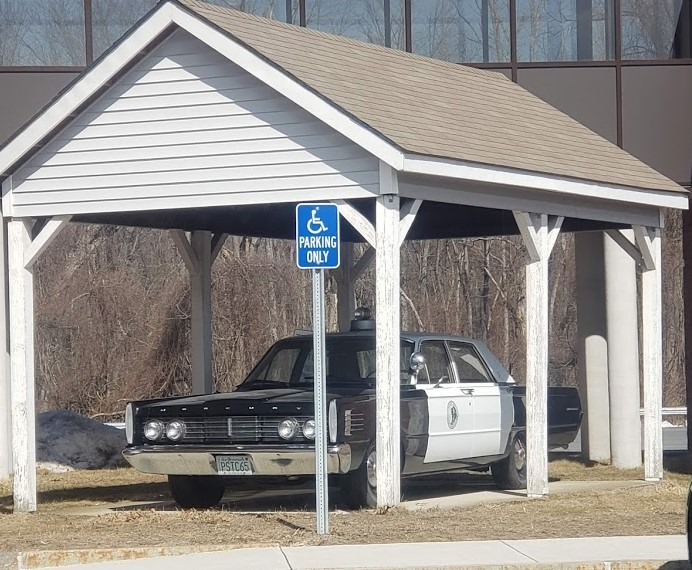
Antique car on display in front of the Police Standards and Training Building

New Hampshire Police Standards and Training Council (PSTC) is a government agency of the U.S. state of New Hampshire responsible for establishing minimum hiring and educational standards as well as the certification process for police and state corrections officers. The council also provides mandatory basic training and in-service training to all police and state corrections officers within New Hampshire.

The council was established by the New Hampshire General Court (state legislature) in 1971. The council is headquartered at 17 Institute Drive in Concord, and is led by a director who is responsible for all administrative operations. The 14-member council consists of:

- two town police chiefs
- two city police chiefs
- two county sheriffs
- two judges of courts with criminal jurisdiction
- the Chancellor of the Community College System of New Hampshire (or designee)
- the Director of the State Police (or designee)
- the Attorney General (or designee)
- the Commissioner of the Department of Corrections (or designee)
- two members of the public
