= Climate change in New Hampshire =

Climate change in the US state of New Hampshire

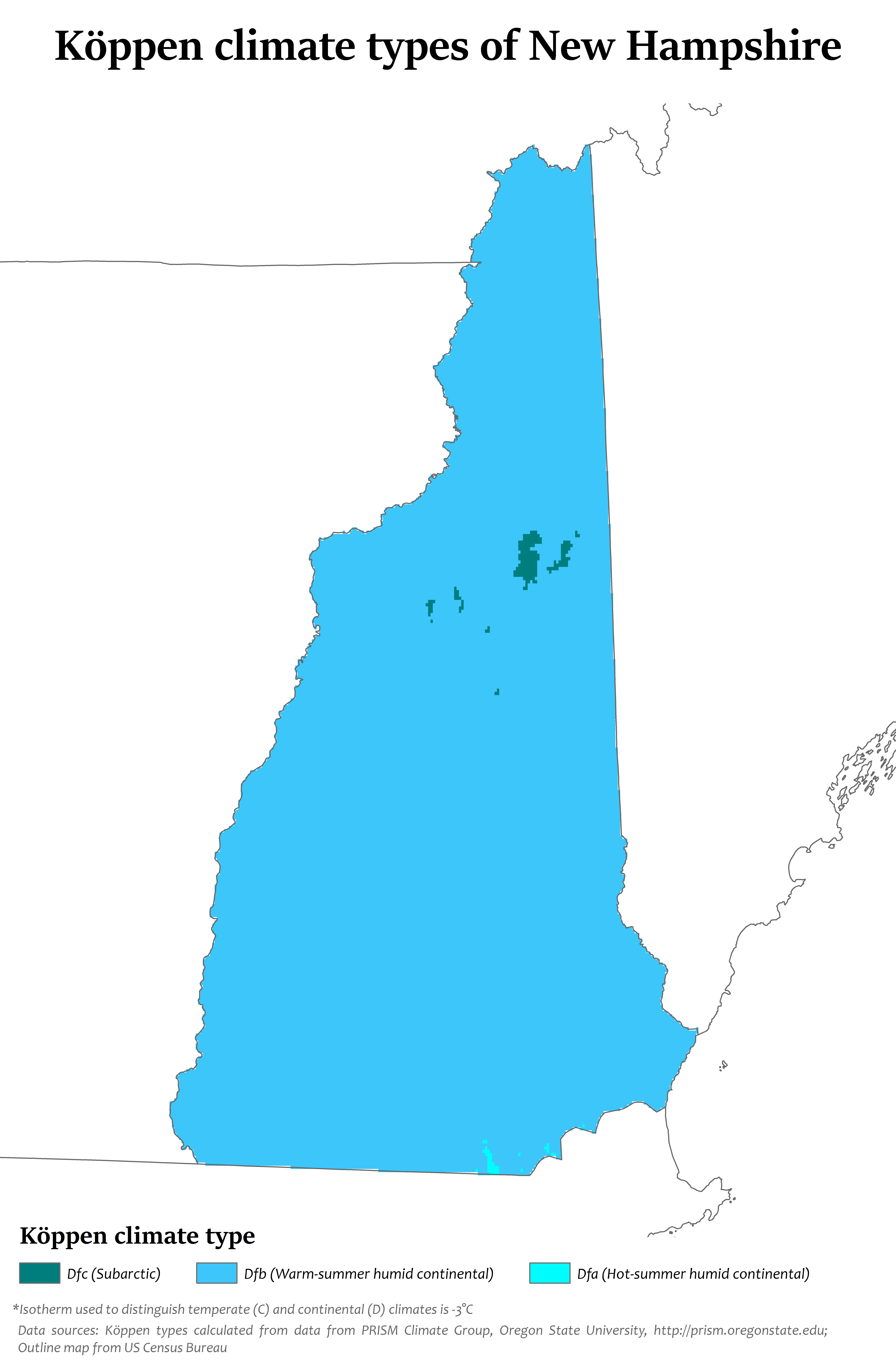
Köppen climate types in New Hampshire, showing most of the state to be warm-summer humid continental.

Climate change in New Hampshire encompasses the effects of climate change, attributed to man-made increases in atmospheric carbon dioxide, in the U.S. state of New Hampshire.

The United States Environmental Protection Agency reports:

New Hampshire's climate is changing. Most of the state has warmed two to three degrees (F) in the last century. Throughout the northeastern United States, spring is arriving earlier and bringing more precipitation, heavy rainstorms are more frequent, and summers are hotter and drier. Sea level is rising, and severe storms cause floods that damage property and infrastructure. In the coming decades, the changing climate is likely to increase flooding, harm ecosystems and winter recreation, disrupt farming, and increase some risks to human health.

== Increasing temperature and changing precipitation patterns ==
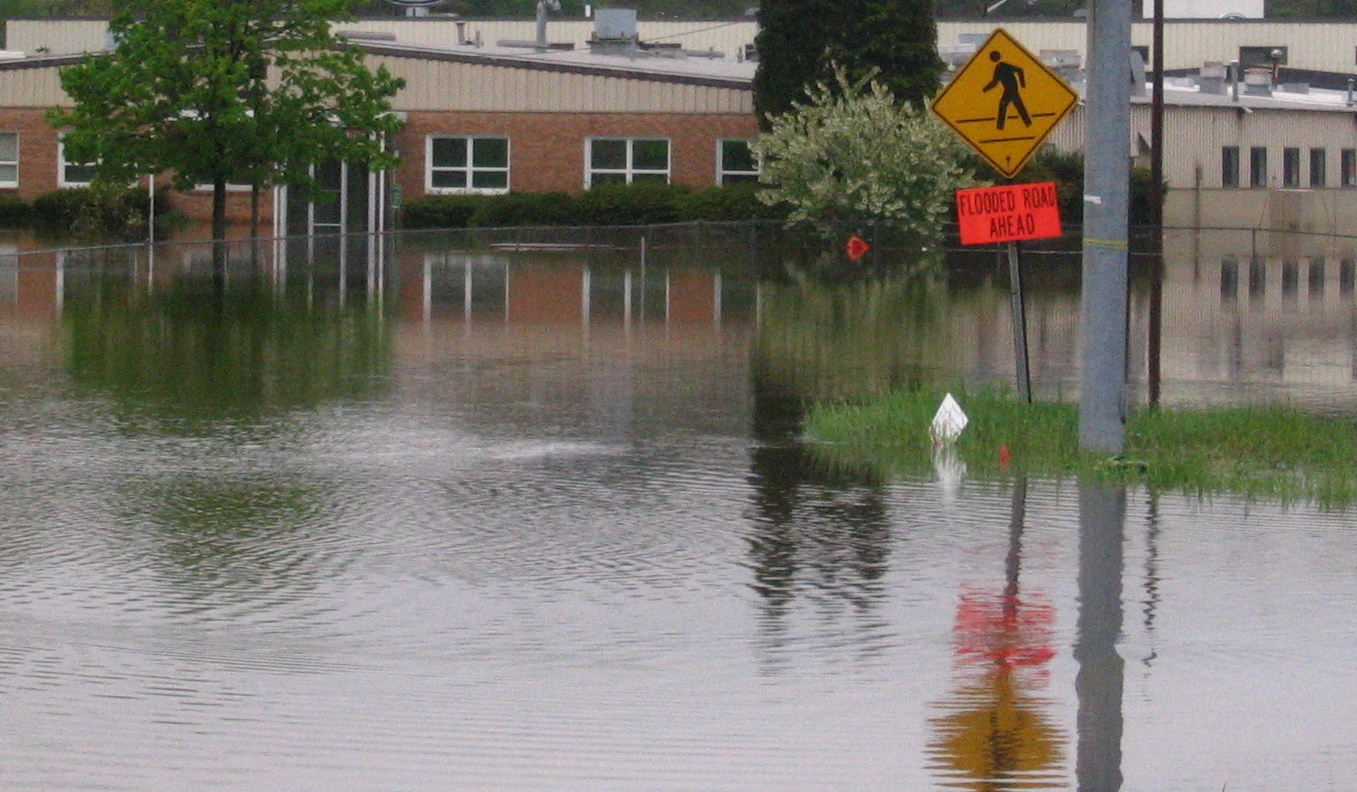
Flooded road, Bow, 2006

"Rising temperatures and shifting rainfall patterns are likely to increase the intensity of both floods and droughts. Average annual precipitation in the Northeast increased 10 percent from 1895 to 2011, and precipitation from extremely heavy storms has increased 70 percent since 1958. During the next century, average annual precipitation and the frequency of heavy downpours are likely to keep rising. Average precipitation is likely to increase during winter and spring, but not change significantly during summer and fall. Rising temperatures will melt snow earlier in spring and increase evaporation, and thereby dry the soil during summer and fall. So flooding is likely to be worse during winter and spring, and droughts worse during summer and fall".

== Effects on winter recreation ==
Since the 1970s temperatures have increased in the winter months and snowfall has significantly decreased. Mean winter temperature has warmed faster than global average, by about 2.1 °C (3.8 °F).(1). While the whole state has seen a steady decline in snowfall, snow loss is particularly prominent in southern New Hampshire. Between 1950 and 2003, annual snowfall in the city of Berlin in northern NH decreased by 43 cm (17 inches). During the same period the city of Keene in southwest NH saw a decrease in snow fall of 58 cm, or just under two feet at 23 inches.

Ski resorts have thus turned to creating artificial snow, which is expensive. Resorts spend approximately $70 to $2,100 per acre-foot depending on location. (An acre-foot refers to the volume needed to cover one acer in one foot of snow.) This cost is calculated through many factors, including the electricity cost, the amount of water consumed, and the need for compressed air to shoot out the newly made snow. Between 1975 and 2000, many ski resorts in NH closed as smaller operators in lower elevations could not afford to invest in snow-making equipment. There were major ski resorts who spent millions of dollars on snow-making equipment from the late 1970s into the early 1980s. The ones that were successful left behind other ski resorts who could not keep up with the pace of investment.

The turn to creating artificial snow also makes skiing a more energy-intensive winter activity. As with natural snow, there are specific conditions and thresholds for making artificial snow. For mountain resorts to make artificial snow, there must be less than 60% humidity and temperatures around 27 degrees. With the rise of temperatures, ski resorts either produce less quality snow or emit more GHG emissions by running the snow machines longer. In addition, shorter, warmer winters also means ski resorts have a difficult time remaining open enough days to make a profit. In NH, a ski resort must be open approximately a 100 days minimum.

== Effects on agriculture ==
Rising temperatures from climate change have been recorded in New Hampshire and can affect agriculture. Temperatures have been rising by 3 degrees Fahrenheit since 1901 while the most significant heating has occurred in the last 50 years, specifically in fall and winter seasons. Similarly, heavy precipitation has increased by 12%, with the largest precipitation changes occurring in the winter season. Droughts and increased temperatures can harm some New Hampshire crops, while the lengthening of the growing season could help them. The Environmental Protection Agency predicts that corn could be affected by this, with yield rates decreasing.

Due to the rising temperatures, New Hampshire has begun to experience longer growing seasons. An area's growing season is measured from the average date of the last frost in the spring to the average date of the first frost in the fall. Since 1960, the length of this period has increased. An early starting growing season can offer farmers new opportunities to take risks trying to grow different crops, but the lengthier season also has its downsides. The longer growing season allows for invasive weeds to grow, and more opportunities for harmful pests are presented. Increasing temperatures through New Hampshire are validated by the USDA plant hardiness zones, sharing the average annual minimum winter temperatures. It shows New Hampshire shifting to a warmer zone. Consistent with this trend, lilacs, apples, and grapes have been blooming early in the Northeast region.

== Sea level rise, wetland loss, and coastal flooding ==
"Rising sea level erodes wetlands and beaches and increases damage from coastal storms. Tidal wetlands are inherently vulnerable because of their low elevations, and shoreline development prevents them from migrating inland onto higher ground. Human activities such as filling wetlands have destroyed about one third of New England's coastal wetlands since the early 1800s. Wetlands provide habitat for many bird species, such as osprey and heron, as well as several fish species. Losing coastal wetlands would harm coastal ecosystems and remove an important line of defense against coastal flooding. Coastal cities and towns will become more vulnerable to storms in the coming century as sea level rises, shorelines erode, and storm surges become higher. Storms can destroy coastal homes, wash out highways and rail lines, and damage essential communication, energy, and wastewater management infrastructure".

=== Effects on Coastal Tourism ===
New Hampshire is a coastal state with coastal communities; due to climate change, there has been a rise in sea levels. The rising sea level is a problem not only for residents but also for tourists. During the summer, places like Hampton Beach and Rye Beach are popular tourist areas; with rising sea levels, the beaches are becoming smaller and more crowded.

== Ecosystems ==
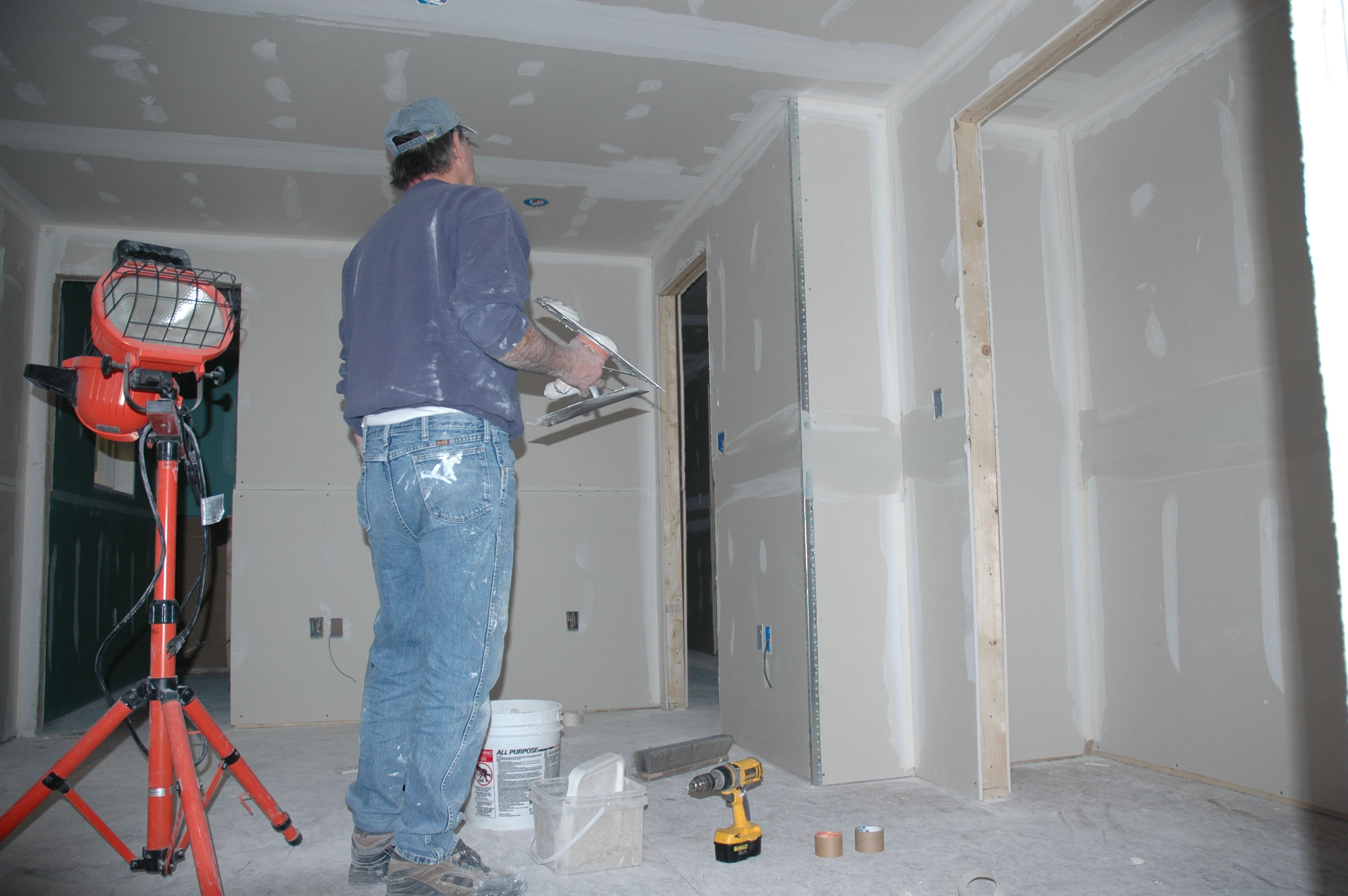
Construction after floods, 2007

"Changing the climate threatens ecosystems by disrupting relationships between species. Wildflowers and woody perennials are blooming—and migratory birds are arriving—sooner in spring. Not all species adjust in the same way, however, so the food that one species needs may no longer be available when that species arrives on its migration. Rising temperatures allow deer populations to increase, reducing forest underbrush, which makes some animals more vulnerable to predators".

"Climate change can allow invasive species to expand their ranges. For example, the hemlock woolly adelgid has infested hemlock trees in southern New Hampshire. Infestation eventually kills almost all hemlock trees, which are replaced by black oaks, black birch, and other hardwoods. Warmer temperatures are likely to enable the woolly adelgid to expand northward. The loss of hemlock trees would remove the primary habitat for the blue-headed vireo and Blackburnian warbler. It could also change stream temperatures and cause streams to run dry more often, harming brook trout and brown trout.

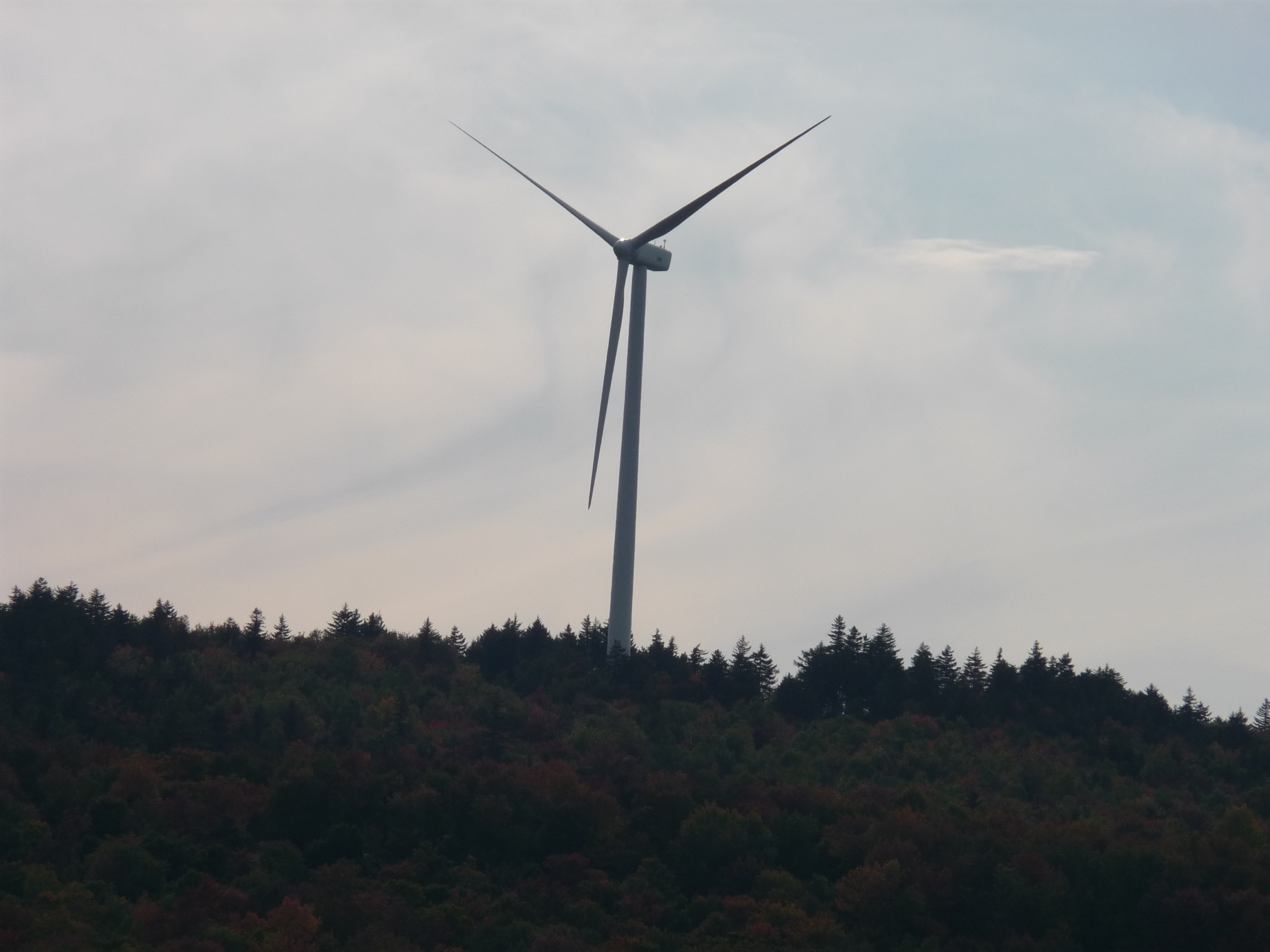
Lempster Mountain wind farm

== Mitigation ==
After passage of the US 2022 Inflation Reduction Act in July 2022, New Hampshire was to receive US $3 million to revise its climate change mitigation plan. That plan was created back in 2009--but had never been updated since. If Granite State officials put together a new climate plan by March 2024, they can apply for more money, out of a designated US $4.6 billion sum for the whole country, to put into effect the revised climate mitigation programs and policies.

== See also ==
- Plug-in electric vehicles in New Hampshire
