= Suzanne Beaulieu =

American politician

Member-elect of the New Hampshire House of Representatives from the Hillsborough 3rd district
- Assuming office December 2026
- Succeeding: Marc Plamondon

Personal details
- Party: Democratic

Suzanne Beaulieu is an American politician. A member of the Democratic Party, she is the member-elect for the Hillsborough 3rd district of the New Hampshire House of Representatives.
