= New Hampshire PBS =

PBS member network serving New Hampshire

- Type: Non-commercial educational broadcast television network
- Branding: NHPBS
- Country: United States
- First air date: July 6, 1959
- TV stations: See § Stations
- Area: Statewide New Hampshire
- Owner: New Hampshire Public Broadcasting
- Affiliation: PBS
- Former affiliations: NET (1959–1970)
- Official website: nhpbs.org

New Hampshire PBS (NHPBS), known as New Hampshire Public Television (NHPTV) prior to October 1, 2017, is a PBS member network serving the U.S. state of New Hampshire. It is operated by New Hampshire Public Broadcasting (NHPB), a community-based organization which holds the licenses to all of the PBS member stations licensed in the state. Its studios are located at the NHPBS Broadcast Center just outside the campus of the University of New Hampshire on Mast Road in Durham.

== History ==
On July 6, 1959, the University of New Hampshire (UNH) signed on WENH-TV (VHF channel 11) as the first educational television station in New Hampshire and one of the first educational stations in New England outside Boston. In the late 1960s, several UHF satellite stations and translators signed-on in northern and western New Hampshire (see below). The operation was named the New Hampshire Network (NHN), adopting the New Hampshire Public Television (NHPTV) name in 1976. In later years, NHPTV occasionally used its flagship station's channel number as its branding.

Initially broadcasting in black-and-white, NHPTV converted its Durham studio to color in 1972, with an increase in the number of locally produced programs taking effect at that time. Among local shows launched in the early 1970s were The State We're In, a nightly newscast focusing on state issues; A Time for Music, live performances by New England–based musicians; live coverage of most University of New Hampshire men's hockey home games; and Your Time, where representatives of non-profit groups were given a half-hour of airtime to showcase their organizations.

A Time for Music and Your Time (the latter later eventually renamed Public Access 11) stayed on the air for several years. The State We're In, later renamed Channel 11 News, went off the air in July 1981 as a result of steep budget cuts, which also forced NHPTV to shut down its satellite transmitters in Hanover and Berlin.

After Channel 11 News was canceled, New Hampshire Journal, a lower-budget weekly news review was launched; that same year, a feature magazine series titled New Hampshire Crossroads premiered; its original host was Tom Bergeron. The latter series was allowed to go ahead despite the 1981 budget cuts because it had received funding from outside sources. Since the hockey telecasts were also funded by outside underwriters, they too were allowed to continue. UNH men's hockey remained on NHPTV until 2008.

The winter of 1984 saw the premiere of NHPTV's long-running academic quiz show Granite State Challenge. Originally hosted by Bergeron, it was hosted by Jim Jeanotte, who also did many years of play-by-play for NHPTV's UNH hockey coverage, from 1985 to 2018. It is now hosted by Bow High School social studies teacher Jon Cannon, who was a member of the Jeopardy! "clue crew" from 2005 to 2009.

On October 1, 2017, NHPTV rebranded as New Hampshire PBS (NHPBS).

== Programming ==
Because New Hampshire is split between the Boston, Portland, Maine and Burlington, Vermont–Plattsburgh, New York viewing areas, nearly all NHPBS viewers also receive another PBS station on cable or satellite (in some cases more than one). For much of its history, NHPTV/NHPBS elected to differentiate its program schedule for the other PBS stations in the market. Generally, NHPTV's broadcast of PBS programs and series did not air on the same day and time as they do on Boston's WGBH-TV, MPBN or Vermont PBS.

NHPTV produced a number of local series, including:

- NH Outlook
- Windows to the Wild
- Granite State Challenge
- Wildlife Journal (co-produced with the New Hampshire Fish and Game Department)
- New Hampshire Crossroads

Production of most local programs, except for Wildlife Journal, was discontinued in June 2011 because NHPTV lost all of its funding from the State of New Hampshire, which accounted for 30% of the station's total fiscal 2011 budget.

NHPTV produced live coverage of most University of New Hampshire men's hockey home games from the 1972–1973 season through the 2007–2008 season. However, in June 2008, NHPTV announced that it was unable to continue to broadcast the games due to budgetary considerations.

The cooking show Ciao Italia with Mary Ann Esposito was formerly distributed by NHPTV and produced at the NHPTV studios in Durham.

In September 2011, NHPTV was said to be in preliminary discussions with WGBH-TV and public broadcasters in Maine and Vermont about sharing infrastructure and content. The station became an independent non-profit organization, New Hampshire Public Broadcasting (NHPB), on July 1, 2012. It had operated as an entity of UNH from 1959 until 2008, when NHPB was established as a nonprofit subsidiary of the University System of New Hampshire (USNH) to take over day-to-day operations, though the USNH Board of Trustees retained the broadcast licenses at that time. This followed the 2011 loss of state funding, which resulted in NHPTV no longer receiving any money from USNH. Certain business services were then outsourced to WGBH, but the station itself still operates independently.

As part of the arrangement, NHPTV began to follow PBS' national schedule in tandem with WGBH-TV on September 30, 2012 (with NHPTV Explore's lineup changing from a mix of educational, New England and local programming to a schedule nearly identical to that of WGBX-TV), and master control operations were relocated to the WGBH studios in Boston. Following the changes, Comcast dropped WGBH and WGBX from its New Hampshire systems and NHPTV from its Massachusetts systems.

== Stations ==
As of the DTV transition on February 17, 2009, the NHPBS stations were:

Station	City of license	Channels VC / RF	First air date	Call letters' meaning	ERP	HAAT	Facility ID	Transmitter coordinates	Public license information
WEKW-TV	Keene	11; 18 (UHF)	May 21, 1968	Educational Keene Western New Hampshire	95 kW	328.4 m (1,077.4 ft)	69271	43°2′0″N 72°22′2″W	Public file LMS
WENH-TV	Durham	11; 11 (VHF)	July 6, 1959	Educational New Hampshire	30 kW; 47.5 kW (application)	304.1 m (997.7 ft); 304.7 m (999.7 ft) (application)	69237	43°10′33″N 71°12′27″W	Public file LMS
WLED-TV	Littleton	11; 23 (UHF)	February 28, 1968	Littleton Educational	65.4 kW	381.9 m (1,253.0 ft)	69328	44°21′10.9″N 71°44′14.9″W	Public file LMS

Notes:
1. WENH did not use the -TV suffix in its callsign during its construction permit until April 17, 1959.

=== Subchannels ===
The signals of the NHPBS stations are multiplexed:

New Hampshire PBS subchannels
Subchannel	Res.	Short name	Programming
xx.1	720p	NHPBS	PBS
xx.2	720p	NHPBE	NH Explore
xx.3	480i	World	World
xx.4	480i	Create	Create
xx.5	480i	NHPBK	PBS Kids

=== Analog-to-digital conversion ===
NHPTV's stations shut down their analog signals on February 17, 2009, the original date on which full-power television stations in the United States were to transition from analog to digital broadcasts under federal mandate (which was later pushed back to June 12, 2009).

Each station's post-transition digital allocations are as follows:

- WEKW-TV shut down its analog signal, over UHF channel 52; the station's digital signal remained on its pre-transition UHF channel 49, using virtual channel 52.
- WENH-TV shut down its analog signal, over VHF channel 11; the station's digital signal relocated from its pre-transition UHF channel 57, which was among the high band UHF channels (52-69) that were removed from broadcasting use as a result of the transition, to its analog-era VHF channel 11.
- WLED-TV shut down its analog signal, over UHF channel 49; the station's digital signal remained on its pre-transition UHF channel 48. using virtual channel 49.

=== Translators ===
- W34DQ-D Pittsburg
- W36FE-D Hanover

Notes:

- 1. Successor to W18BO, which operated on analog channel 18 in Pittsburg. From 2005 until November 4, 2009, W26CQ was owned by Hearst Television and served as a translator for ABC affiliate WMTW. The license for W26CQ was cancelled by the Federal Communications Commission (FCC) on October 5, 2016.
- 2. The FCC considers W34DQ-D to be the same station as the former W18BO. It went on the air on September 27, 2010, and is currently operated in addition to W26CQ.
- 3. Formerly W15BK, which operated on analog channel 15 (it flash-cut to digital on September 4, 2007).

All three translators directly repeat WENH. Colebrook and Pittsburg are part of the Portland market, while Hanover is part of the Burlington–Plattsburgh market.

In addition, NHPBS acquired W27CP in White River Junction, Vermont, from WMTW along with W26CQ; that station went dark on July 15, 2009 (while still owned by WMTW), due to having lost the lease on its tower site, and never returned to the air, leading the FCC to delete W27CP on September 14, 2011.

=== Former stations ===
In the summer of 1981, New Hampshire Public Television was suffering a significant financial crisis. These stations were turned off permanently as a result, concluding in 1982.

Station	City of license	Channel	Call letters' meaning	Facility ID	Transmitter coordinates
W59AB (low power)	North Woodstock	59 (UHF)			
WEDB-TV	Berlin	40 (UHF)	Educational Berlin	69056	44°22′15.8″N 71°12′47.1″W
WHED-TV	Hanover	15 (UHF)^{1}	Hanover Educational	69303	43°42′32.1″N 72°9′14.7″W

Few viewers lost access to PBS programming as a result of these stations being shut down due to the high penetration of cable, which is all but essential for acceptable television in most of New Hampshire.

WHED-TV was eventually replaced, in 1994, by a translator (originally W15BK, operating on WHED's former analog channel 15, and then, starting in 2007, low-power digital station W50DP-D).

== Cable and satellite availability ==
NHPBS is available over the air in nearly 98 percent of New Hampshire, and is carried on nearly all cable systems in the state. Additionally, flagship station WENH is available on a limited set of cable television providers in parts of Maine (including Portland) and Vermont (including the Barre/Montpelier area). WENH is available on DirecTV and Dish Network's Boston feeds as well; Durham is part of the Boston market. WLED is carried on the Burlington–Plattsburgh Dish Network feed; Littleton is part of the Burlington–Plattsburgh market.

It had been available on most cable systems in eastern Massachusetts (including Boston) for decades until October 2012.

Although NHPBS has been available for decades on cable systems in southern Maine, it has yet to be added to the Portland DBS feeds because of W26CQ and W34DQ-D's low-power status. However, NHPBS is working to change the satellite regulations so it can be carried in the Portland market as well. It also has a long-term goal of building a full-power transmitter atop Mount Washington, which would improve reception in northern New Hampshire and the Upper Connecticut Valley, as well as presumably offer city-grade coverage of Portland.
