= David Fracht =

American politician

Member of the New Hampshire House of Representatives from the Grafton 16th district
- Incumbent
- Assumed office September 6, 2023
- Preceded by: Joshua Adjutant

Personal details
- Party: Democratic
- Children: 2
- Education: Western Reserve University

David Fracht is an American politician. He serves as a Democratic member for the Grafton 16th district of the New Hampshire House of Representatives.

== Life and career ==
Fracht attended Western Reserve University.

In 2023, Fracht defeated John P. Keane in the special general election for the Grafton 16th district of the New Hampshire House of Representatives, winning 71 percent of the votes.
