= New Hampshire Fish and Game Department =

Government agency in the U.S. state of New Hampshire

Agency overview
- Formed: 1865
- Headquarters: 11 Hazen Drive, Concord, NH
- Annual budget: $27.94M (2016)
- Agency executives: 11 Commissioners, appointed by the Governor; Dr Stephanie Simek, Executive Director
- Website: www.wildlife.state.nh.us

The New Hampshire Fish and Game Department (NHF&G) is a department within the government of New Hampshire in the United States. The Fish and Game Department manages New Hampshire's fish, game, and aquatic plant resources.

== Structure ==
The department was created in 1865 to both propagate and conserve the state's fish and game. The Governor of New Hampshire appoints 11 Fish and Game Commission members; one from each of the state's ten counties, plus one from the Seacoast Region. The Executive Director is appointed by the Governor and confirmed by the Executive Council. New Hampshire Fish and Game is primarily funded by sources other than New Hampshire general tax dollars. Most of the funding that enables the department to manage over 500 species of wildlife and fish and over 74,000 acres of habitat comes from the purchase of hunting and fishing licenses and from public spending on fishing equipment, firearms and ammunition, motor boat fuel, and archery equipment. The department maintains four regional offices within the state:

NHF&G Regional Offices
Region	Area	Headquarters
1	North Country	Lancaster
2	Lakes Region and Central NH	New Hampton
3	Southeastern NH / Seacoast	Durham
4	Southwestern NH	Keene

The department also has a Law Enforcement Division, which operates in six districts across the state. Each district is staffed by a lieutenant, a sergeant, and several Conservation Officers (CO).

NHF&G Law Enforcement Districts
District	Counties†	Headquarters
1	Coös	Lancaster
2	Carroll, Belknap	New Hampton
3	Grafton, Sullivan	New Hampton
4	Cheshire, Hillsborough	Keene
5	Merrimack, Rockingham, Strafford	Concord
6	(Seacoast Region)	Durham

† Districts do not exactly align to county boundaries.

== Wildlife Heritage Foundation of New Hampshire ==
In 2006, the Wildlife Heritage Foundation of New Hampshire was formed due to falling revenues from the Fish & Game Department's licenses for hunting and fishing. The foundation works with and supports the Fish and Game Department on projects and events which otherwise could not be funded. The foundation is a nonprofit 501(c)(3) organization.

Since 2017, Conservation Officers within the Fish and Game Department have been featured on the Animal Planet reality program North Woods Law. The production company for the series makes a $2,000 donation per aired episode to the Wildlife Heritage Foundation.

== See also ==
- List of state and territorial fish and wildlife management agencies in the United States
- List of law enforcement agencies in New Hampshire
