= New Hampshire statistical areas =

Coordinates: 43.6805°N 71.5811°W

The U.S. State of New Hampshire currently has eight statistical areas that have been delineated by the Office of Management and Budget (OMB). On July 21, 2023, the OMB delineated two combined statistical areas, two metropolitan statistical areas, and four micropolitan statistical areas in New Hampshire. As of 2025, the largest of these is the Boston–Worcester–Providence, MA-RI-NH CSA, comprising the area around Boston; this area includes Manchester, New Hampshire's largest city, and Concord, its capital.

== Statistical areas ==
The Office of Management and Budget (OMB) has designated more than 1,000 statistical areas for the United States and Puerto Rico. These statistical areas are important geographic delineations of population clusters used by the OMB, the United States Census Bureau, planning organizations, and federal, state, and local government entities.

The OMB defines a core-based statistical area (CBSA) as the county or counties (or county-equivalents) surrounding at least one densely-settled core of at least 10,000 population, "plus adjacent counties having a high degree of social and economic integration with the core as measured through commuting ties with the counties containing the core". The OMB further divides a CBSA based on population into a metropolitan statistical area (MSA) for those with at least 50,000 people or a micropolitan statistical area (μSA) for those with 10,000 to 49,999 people.

The OMB defines a combined statistical area (CSA) as two or more adjacent CBSAs where the employment interchange rate (percent commuting from A to B plus percent commuting from B to A) is at least 15%. A primary statistical area (PSA) includes all CSAs and any CBSA that is not a constituent of a combined statistical area.

The eight United States statistical areas and ten counties of the State of New Hampshire (Note: An out-of-state area and its population are displayed in green. An area that extends into more than one state is displayed in purple. A purple population number over a black population number show the total population versus the in-state population. The state's abbreviation is also shown next to the in-state total.)
Combined statistical area	2025 population (est.)	Core-based statistical area	2025 population (est.)	County	2025 population (est.)	Metropolitan division	2025 population (est.)
Boston–Worcester–Providence, MA-RI-NH CSA	8,521,063; 1,115,760 (NH)	Boston–Cambridge–Newton, MA-NH MSA	5,034,221; 459,120 (NH)	Middlesex County, Massachusetts	1,669,979	Cambridge–Newton–Framingham, MA MD	2,496,632
Boston–Worcester–Providence, MA-RI-NH CSA	8,521,063; 1,115,760 (NH)	Boston–Cambridge–Newton, MA-NH MSA	5,034,221; 459,120 (NH)	Essex County, Massachusetts	826,653	Cambridge–Newton–Framingham, MA MD	2,496,632
Boston–Worcester–Providence, MA-RI-NH CSA	8,521,063; 1,115,760 (NH)	Boston–Cambridge–Newton, MA-NH MSA	5,034,221; 459,120 (NH)	Suffolk County, Massachusetts	791,891	Boston, MA MD	2,078,469
Boston–Worcester–Providence, MA-RI-NH CSA	8,521,063; 1,115,760 (NH)	Boston–Cambridge–Newton, MA-NH MSA	5,034,221; 459,120 (NH)	Norfolk County, Massachusetts	739,749	Boston, MA MD	2,078,469
Boston–Worcester–Providence, MA-RI-NH CSA	8,521,063; 1,115,760 (NH)	Boston–Cambridge–Newton, MA-NH MSA	5,034,221; 459,120 (NH)	Plymouth County, Massachusetts	546,829	Boston, MA MD	2,078,469
Boston–Worcester–Providence, MA-RI-NH CSA	8,521,063; 1,115,760 (NH)	Boston–Cambridge–Newton, MA-NH MSA	5,034,221; 459,120 (NH)	Rockingham County, New Hampshire	324,077	Rockingham County–Strafford County, NH MD	459,120
Boston–Worcester–Providence, MA-RI-NH CSA	8,521,063; 1,115,760 (NH)	Boston–Cambridge–Newton, MA-NH MSA	5,034,221; 459,120 (NH)	Strafford County, New Hampshire	135,043	Rockingham County–Strafford County, NH MD	459,120
Boston–Worcester–Providence, MA-RI-NH CSA	8,521,063; 1,115,760 (NH)	Providence–Warwick, RI-MA MSA	1,708,161	Providence County, Rhode Island	678,179	none	
Boston–Worcester–Providence, MA-RI-NH CSA	8,521,063; 1,115,760 (NH)	Providence–Warwick, RI-MA MSA	1,708,161	Bristol County, Massachusetts	593,640	none	
Boston–Worcester–Providence, MA-RI-NH CSA	8,521,063; 1,115,760 (NH)	Providence–Warwick, RI-MA MSA	1,708,161	Kent County, Rhode Island	173,495	none	
Boston–Worcester–Providence, MA-RI-NH CSA	8,521,063; 1,115,760 (NH)	Providence–Warwick, RI-MA MSA	1,708,161	Washington County, Rhode Island	129,795	none	
Boston–Worcester–Providence, MA-RI-NH CSA	8,521,063; 1,115,760 (NH)	Providence–Warwick, RI-MA MSA	1,708,161	Newport County, Rhode Island	83,051	none	
Boston–Worcester–Providence, MA-RI-NH CSA	8,521,063; 1,115,760 (NH)	Providence–Warwick, RI-MA MSA	1,708,161	Bristol County, Rhode Island	50,001	none	
Boston–Worcester–Providence, MA-RI-NH CSA	8,521,063; 1,115,760 (NH)	Worcester, MA MSA	888,502	Worcester County, Massachusetts	888,502	none	
Boston–Worcester–Providence, MA-RI-NH CSA	8,521,063; 1,115,760 (NH)	Manchester–Nashua, NH MSA	433,415	Hillsborough County, New Hampshire	433,415	none	
Boston–Worcester–Providence, MA-RI-NH CSA	8,521,063; 1,115,760 (NH)	Barnstable Town, MA MSA	233,539	Barnstable County, Massachusetts	233,539	none	
Boston–Worcester–Providence, MA-RI-NH CSA	8,521,063; 1,115,760 (NH)	Concord, NH μSA	158,078	Merrimack County, New Hampshire	158,078	none	
Boston–Worcester–Providence, MA-RI-NH CSA	8,521,063; 1,115,760 (NH)	Laconia, NH μSA	65,147	Belknap County, New Hampshire	65,147	none	
none		Lebanon–Claremont, NH-VT μSA	224,500; 137,186 (NH)	Grafton County, New Hampshire	93,225	none	
none		Lebanon–Claremont, NH-VT μSA	224,500; 137,186 (NH)	Windsor County, Vermont	57,312	none	
none		Lebanon–Claremont, NH-VT μSA	224,500; 137,186 (NH)	Sullivan County, New Hampshire	43,961	none	
none		Lebanon–Claremont, NH-VT μSA	224,500; 137,186 (NH)	Orange County, Vermont	30,002	none	
Keene–Brattleboro, NH-VT CSA	123,473; 78,269 (NH)	Keene, NH μSA	78,269	Cheshire County, New Hampshire	78,269	none	
Keene–Brattleboro, NH-VT CSA	123,473; 78,269 (NH)	Brattleboro, VT μSA	45,204	Windham County, Vermont	45,204	none	
none				Carroll County, New Hampshire	52,784	none	
none				Coös County, New Hampshire	31,343	none	
State of New Hampshire					1,415,342	none	

The six core-based statistical areas of the State of New Hampshire (Note: For CBSAs comprising populations from multiple states, they are listed twice to show both their intrastate population within that CBSA as well as the CBSA's total population. Only the intrastate population is ranked.)
2025 rank	Core-based statistical area	Population				
2025 rank	Core-based statistical area	2025 estimate	Change	2020 Census	Change	2010 Census
1	Boston–Cambridge–Newton, MA-NH MSA (NH)	459,120	+3.16%	445,065	+6.38%	418,366
2	Manchester–Nashua, NH MSA	433,415	+2.48%	422,937	+5.54%	400,721
3	Concord, NH μSA	158,078	+2.78%	153,808	+5.03%	146,445
4	Lebanon–Claremont, NH-VT μSA (NH)	137,186	+2.18%	134,264	+1.06%	132,860
5	Keene, NH μSA	78,269	+2.37%	76,458	−0.85%	77,117
6	Laconia, NH μSA	65,147	+2.26%	63,705	+6.02%	60,088
	Boston–Cambridge–Newton, MA-NH MSA	5,034,221	+1.87%	4,941,632	+8.55%	4,552,402
	Lebanon–Claremont, NH-VT μSA	224,500	+1.45%	221,294	+1.29%	218,466

The two combined statistical areas of the State of New Hampshire (Note: For CSAs comprising populations from multiple states, they are listed twice to show both their intrastate population within that CSA as well as the CSA's total population. Only the intrastate population is ranked.)
2025 rank	Combined statistical area	Population				
2025 rank	Combined statistical area	2025 estimate	Change	2020 Census	Change	2010 Census
1	Boston–Worcester–Providence, MA-RI-NH CSA (NH)	1,115,760	+2.79%	1,085,515	+5.84%	1,025,620
2	Keene–Brattleboro, NH-VT CSA (NH)	78,269	+2.37%	76,458	−0.85%	77,117
	Boston–Worcester–Providence, MA-RI-NH CSA	8,521,063	+2.05%	8,349,768	+7.39%	7,774,948
	Keene–Brattleboro, NH-VT CSA	123,473	+0.91%	122,363	+0.60%	121,630

== See also ==
- Geography of New Hampshire
  - Demographics of New Hampshire
