= Marc Plamondon =

American politician

Member of the New Hampshire House of Representatives from the Hillsborough 3rd district
- Incumbent
- Assumed office May 31, 2023
- Succeeded by: Suzanne Beaulieu (elect)

Personal details
- Party: Democratic

Marc Plamondon is an American politician. He serves as a Democratic member for the Hillsborough 3rd district of the New Hampshire House of Representatives.

== Life and career ==
Plamondon is a former Nashua alderman.

In 2023, Plamondon defeated David Narkunas in the special general election for the Hillsborough 3rd district of the New Hampshire House of Representatives, winning 71 percent of the votes.
