= List of law enforcement agencies in New Hampshire =

This is a list of law enforcement agencies in the state of New Hampshire.

According to the US Bureau of Justice Statistics' 2018 Census of State and Local Law Enforcement Agencies, the state had 212 law enforcement agencies employing 3,096 full-time sworn police officers, about 229 for each 100,000 residents.

== State agencies ==
- New Hampshire Judicial Branch
  - Administrative Office of the Courts
    - Security Department
- New Hampshire Liquor Commission
  - Division of Enforcement & Licensing
- New Hampshire Department of Corrections
  - Division of Professional Standards
    - Investigations Bureau
- New Hampshire Department of Safety
  - Division of Fire Safety (Office of State Fire Marshal)
  - Division of State Police
- New Hampshire Fish and Game Department
  - Law Enforcement Division
- New Hampshire Department of Justice
- New Hampshire Department of Natural and Cultural Resources
  - Division of Forests and Lands
    - Forest Protection Bureau
- New Hampshire General Court
  - Protective Services Unit
- New Hampshire Police Standards and Training Council
- Pease Development Authority
  - Division of Ports and Harbors (Note: The division's chief harbor master and deputy chief harbormaster are sworn law enforcement officers.)
- New Hampshire Department of Agriculture, Markets and Food
  - Division of Weights and Measures (Note: The division's director and investigators are required to have part-time law enforcement certifications.)

== County agencies ==
- Belknap County Attorney's Office (Note: A number of County Attorney's offices in New Hampshire employ sworn investigators)
- Belknap County Sheriff's Office
- Carroll County Sheriff's Office
- Cheshire County Attorney's Office
- Cheshire County Sheriff's Department
- Coös County Sheriff's Office
- Grafton County Attorney's Office
- Grafton County Sheriff's Office
- Hillsborough County Attorney's Office
- Hillsborough County Sheriff's Office
- Merrimack County Attorney's Office
- Merrimack County Sheriff's Office
- Rockingham County Attorney's Office
- Rockingham County Sheriff's Office
- Strafford County Attorney's Office
- Strafford County Sheriff's Office
- Sullivan County Sheriff's Office

== Municipal agencies ==
- Belknap County
  - Alton Police Department
  - Barnstead Police Department
  - Belmont Police Department
  - Center Harbor Police Department
  - Gilford Police Department
  - Gilmanton Police Department
  - Laconia Police Department
  - Meredith Police Department
  - New Hampton Police Department
  - Sanborton Police Department
  - Tilton Police Department
- Carroll County
  - Bartlett Police Department
  - Conway Police Department
  - Effingham Police Department
  - Freedom Police Department
  - Jackson Police Department
  - Madison Police Department
  - Moultonborough Police Department
  - Ossipee Police Department
  - Sandwich Police Department
  - Tamworth Police Department
  - Tuftonboro Police Department
  - Wakefield Police Department
  - Wolfeboro Police Department
- Cheshire County
  - Alstead Police Department
  - Chesterfield Police Department
  - Dublin Police Department
  - Fitzwilliam Police Department
  - Harrisville Police Department
  - Hinsdale Police Department
  - Jaffrey Police Department
  - Keene Police Department
  - Marlborough Police Department
  - Marlow Police Department
  - Nelson Police Department
  - Rindge Police Department
  - Roxbury Police Department
  - Stoddard Police Department
  - Swanzey Police Department
  - Troy Police Department
  - Walpole Police Department
  - Winchester Police Department
- Coös County
  - Berlin Police Department
  - Carroll Police Department
  - Colebrook Police Department
  - Gorham Police Department
  - Lancaster Police Department
  - Northumberland Police Department
  - Pittsburg Police Department
  - Whitefield Police Department
- Grafton County
  - Alexandria Police Department
  - Ashland Police Department
  - Bath Police Department
  - Bethlehem Police Department
  - Bridgewater Police Department
  - Bristol Police Department
  - Campton Police Department
  - Canaan Police Department
  - Enfield Police Department
  - Franconia Police Department
  - Grafton Police Department
  - Groton Police Department
  - Hanover Police Department
  - Haverhill Police Department
  - Hebron Police Department
  - Holderness Police Department
  - Lebanon Police Department
  - Lincoln Police Department
  - Lisbon Police Department
  - Littleton Police Department
  - Lyme Police Department
  - Orford Police Department
  - Piermont Police Department
  - Plymouth Police Department
  - Rumney Police Department
  - Sugar Hill Police Department
  - Thornton Police Department
  - Warren Police Department
  - Waterville Valley Police Department
  - Wentworth Police Department
  - Woodstock Police Department
- Hillsborough County
  - Amherst Police Department
  - Antrim Police Department
  - Bedford Police Department
  - Bennington Department
  - Brookline Police Department
  - Francestown Police Department
  - Goffstown Police Department
  - Hancock Police Department
  - Hillsborough Police Department
  - Hollis Police Department
  - Hudson Police Department
  - Litchfield Police Department
  - Lyndeborough Police Department
  - Manchester Police Department
  - Mason Police Department
  - Merrimack Police Department
  - Milford Police Department
  - Mont Vernon Police Department
  - Nashua Police Department
  - New Boston Police Department
  - New Ipswich Police Department
  - Pelham Police Department
  - Peterborough Police Department
  - Temple-Greenville Police Department (Towns of Greenville and Temple)
  - Weare Police Department
  - Wilton Police Department
- Merrimack County
  - Allenstown Police Department
  - Andover Police Department
  - Boscawen Police Department
  - Bow Police Department
  - Bradford Police Department
  - Canterbury Police Department
  - Chichester Police Department
  - Concord Police Department
  - Danbury Police Department
  - Dunbarton Police Department
  - Epsom Police Department
  - Franklin Police Department
  - Henniker Police Department
  - Hill Police Department
  - Hooksett Police Department
  - Hopkinton Police Department
  - Loudon Police Department
  - New London Police Department
  - Newbury Police Department
  - Northfield Police Department
  - Pembroke Police Department
  - Pittsfield Police Department
  - Sutton Police Department
  - Warner Police Department
  - Webster Police Department
- Rockingham County
  - Atkinson Police Department
  - Auburn Police Department
  - Brentwood Police Department
  - Candia Police Department
  - Chester Police Department
  - Danville Police Department
  - Deerfield Police Department
  - Derry Police Department
  - East Kingston Police Department
  - Epping Police Department
  - Exeter Police Department
  - Fremont Police Department
  - Greenland Police Department
  - Hampstead Police Department
  - Hampton Police Department
  - Hampton Falls Police Department
  - Kensington Police Department
  - Kingston Police Department
  - Londonderry Police Department
  - New Castle Police Department
  - Newfields Police Department
  - Newington Police Department
  - Newmarket Police Department
  - Newton Police Department
  - North Hampton Police Department
  - Northwood Police Department
  - Nottingham Police Department
  - Plaistow Police Department
  - Portsmouth Police Department
  - Raymond Police Department
  - Rye Police Department
  - Salem Police Department
  - Sandown Police Department
  - Seabrook Police Department
  - South Hampton Police Department
  - Stratham Police Department
  - Windham Police Department
- Strafford County
  - Barrington Police Department
  - Dover Police Department
  - Durham Police Department
  - Farmington Police Department
  - Lee Police Department
  - Madbury Police Department
  - Middleton Police Department
  - Milton Police Department
  - New Durham Police Department
  - Rochester Police Department
  - Rollinsford Police Department
  - Somersworth Police Department
  - Strafford Police Department
- Sullivan County
  - Charlestown Police Department
  - Claremont Police Department
  - Cornish Police Department
  - Goshen Police Department
  - Grantham Police Department
  - Langdon Police Department
  - Newport Police Department
  - Plainfield Police Department
  - Springfield Police Department
  - Sunapee Police Department
  - Washington Police Department

== College and university agencies ==
- University of New Hampshire Police Department

== Railroad Police agencies ==
- CSX Police Department
- Mount Washington Cog Railway (Note: According to a list obtained from the PSTC, the railway employed 1 sworn officer as of 4/1/2024.)

== Disbanded agencies ==
- Croydon Police Department
- Dalton Police Department
- Deering Police Department
- Errol Police Department
- Gilsum Police Department
- New Hampshire Department of Health and Human Services
  - New Hampshire Hospital/State Office Park South Campus Police (transferred to State Police in 2005)
- New Hampshire Department of Safety
  - Division of Motor Vehicles
    - Bureau of Enforcement (merged into Division of State Police in 1996)
    - Bureau of Highway Patrol (merged into Division of State Police in 2008)
  - Division of Safety Services
    - Bureau of Marine Patrol (merged into State Police in 2011)
- Lempster Police Department
- Milan Police Department
- Plymouth State University Police Department
- Randolph Police Department
- Richmond Police Department
- Salisbury Police Department
- Stewartstown Police Department
- Stratford Police Department
- Sullivan Police Department
- Surry Police Department
- Unity Police Department
- Greenville Police Department
- Temple Police Department
