= Michael Murphy (New Hampshire politician) =

American politician

Member of the New Hampshire House of Representatives from the Coos 6th district
- In office January 31, 2024 – May 22, 2026
- Preceded by: William Hatch
- Succeeded by: Richard Umiker (elect)

Personal details
- Party: Republican

Michael Murphy is an American politician. He served as a Republican member for the Coos 6th district of the New Hampshire House of Representatives.

== Life and career ==
Murphy is a Navy Seabee veteran.

In December 2023, Murphy defeated Don Lacasse in the special Republican primary election for the Coos 6th district of the New Hampshire House of Representatives. In January 2024, he defeated Edith Tucker in the special general election, winning 53 percent of the vote. He resigned from the chamber in May 2026.
