= New Hampshire Gay Men's Chorus =

Background information
- Also known as: NHGMC
- Origin: Manchester, New Hampshire, United States
- Genres: Broadway, choral, classical, jazz, popular
- Occupation: Men's Chorus
- Instrument: 26 voices
- Years active: 1998-present
- Label: Self-produced
- Members: Artistic Director; Luc Andre Roberge; Accompanist; Gary Finger
- Website: www.nhgmc.com

The New Hampshire Gay Men's Chorus (NHGMC) is an American choral organization in Manchester, New Hampshire. Established in 1998, and member of the Manchester Performing Arts Association, the stated mission of the NHGMC is to present quality entertainment, provide an opportunity for wholesome social interaction for its members, and present a positive image of the gay community in New Hampshire.

The chorus produces two concert series each year; the winter concert in early December, and the spring concert in early May. The chorus also accepts requests for public and private performances from community organizations year-round.

Membership is open to all men, 18 years and older, who are gay or gay-friendly, and enjoy the camaraderie and satisfaction of singing in a vocal group. New members are welcomed to join the chorus at the beginning of each season.

The chorus is currently under the direction of Luc Andre Roberge. Its accompanist is pianist Gary Finger. As of their winter 2011 season, there were 26 singing members in the group.

== History ==
April 27, 2003 was proclaimed "New Hampshire Gay Men's Chorus Day" by Manchester mayor Robert A. Baines.

In June 2004, the chorus traveled to Orlando, Florida. NHGMC performed with the Orlando Gay Chorus during Gay Days.

On June 5, 2004, the chorus was the first openly gay organization to perform at Walt Disney World property, on stage at the EPCOT Center. The performance was coordinated with Disney's Magic Music Days.

On June 4, 2005, the chorus performed for Pride Day at Faneuil Hall in Boston, Massachusetts. This event was part of Boston Pride 2005.

== Recordings ==
In December 2001, the chorus recorded its first recording, Nostalgic Holiday. It was recorded live at the Unitarian Universalist Church in Manchester. The recording contains 18 tracks and its run time is approximately 52 minutes and 35 seconds.

In May 2003, the chorus recorded its second recording, Take Five, in honor of its fifth anniversary. It was recorded live at the Unitarian Universalist Church in Manchester. The recording of 19 tracks runs approximately 72 minutes and contains favorite selections from the first four years of the chorus as chosen by its members.

In June 2008, the chorus recorded its third recording, Celebrates 10, in honor of its tenth anniversary. It was recorded live at the Unitarian Universalist Church in Manchester. The recording contains 19 tracks.
