= New Hampshire Snowmobile Association =

The New Hampshire Snowmobile Association is an association of independently incorporated snowmobile clubs.

== History ==
In 2002, the NHSA successfully lobbied to have House Bill 1348, Chapter 253 enacted into law in New Hampshire. The law states that everyone who registers a snowmobile in New Hampshire needs to show proof of membership with a New Hampshire snowmobile club affiliated with the New Hampshire Snowmobile Association, or pay an extra $30.00 per snowmobile.
