= New Hampshire Wildlife Federation =

American non-profit organization

- Founded: 1933
- Founder: Jay Norwood Darling
- Purpose: Environmentalism
- Location: New Hampshire, United States
- Region served: United States
- Method: Education, conservation, sportsmanship, stewardship
- Website: nhwf.org

The New Hampshire Wildlife Federation (NHWF) is a non-profit member organization promoting conservation, environmental education, sportsmanship, and outdoor activities such as hunting, fishing, trapping, camping, and photography. Its mission statement is "To be the leading advocate for the promotion and protection of hunting, fishing and trapping as well as the conservation of, and access to, fish and wildlife habitats."

== History and mission ==
In the 1930s, Jay Norwood Darling, the force behind the Federal Wildlife Restoration Program, was touring the country urging sportsmen and women to unite in order to protect local habitats and the future of outdoor sports. A small group of foresighted New Hampshire sportsmen heeded this call and the New Hampshire Wildlife Federation was born, founded in 1933 as the Federated Sportsmen's Club of New Hampshire.

Shortly thereafter, a national movement of all the state groups that started under Darling met in Washington, D.C., and in 1963 became affiliated with the new National Wildlife Federation. NHWF remained affiliated with the NWF until 2005, when policy differences led to the NHWF disaffiliating from the NWF. The name of the organization was changed to the New Hampshire Wildlife Federation sometime in the early 1970s. NHWF was organized as a 501(c)(4) non-profit organization at that time, but became a 501(c)(3) in 2001.

The mission of the New Hampshire Wildlife Federation has been revised several times over the years. The current mission reads:

"To be the leading advocate for the promotion and protection of hunting, fishing and trapping as well as the conservation of, and access to, fish and wildlife habitats."

NHWF is governed by a board of directors composed of fifteen directors, four officers (president, vice president, treasurer, and secretary), and the immediate past president.

Affiliated clubs and organizations are entitled to two voting delegates and two alternates. It is these delegates and the board of directors who set policies for NHWF. The board of directors has fiduciary responsibilities and the obligation to carry out established policy. The board of directors is responsible for the hiring and supervision of the executive director.

For many years, NHWF was strictly a volunteer organization. In the late 1970s, Dr. Joseph Ezyk, an economics professor at Saint Anselm College and a dedicated sportsman, realized that to be a serious force in the conservation movement, NHWF needed to be revitalized. It was at about this time that the dam at Sewall's Falls in Concord, New Hampshire breached and an outstanding fishery was discovered. Ezyk and a few other volunteers hired an executive director (Bob Carlson), re-established the organizations newspaper, visited sporting clubs and recruited members. Keeping rivers such as the Merrimack in Concord open and free flowing was the objective of the new NHWF.

Among the accomplishments since those early years has been the Sewall's Falls project, stopping a dam at Livermore Falls, writing the legislation that established the moose management program and moose hunt, creating public access legislation that has been the only success in providing public access to the state's water, insisting that game and fishing season be set by the professional managers at the Fish and Game Department, not by the whims of the legislature, allowing sporting clubs a voice in the selection of Fish and Game Commissioners, and keeping fish and game funds secure in the department and not siphoned to the general fund of the state. NHWF was also a key player in the establishment of the Non-Game and Endangered Wildlife division at Fish and Game and helped provide the initial funding for that program. NHWF has played an important role in establishing the new Land and Community Heritage Commission.

Other programs NHWF helped establish include Operation Game Thief (now under the Fish and Game Department) and Becoming an Outdoors Woman of New Hampshire. NHWF co-sponsored the North Country Legislative Tour for six years, established the Hides for Habitats Program, and helped distribute 3,500 National Wildlife Week kits to every third, fourth and fifth grade classroom in the state.

NHWF publishes a bi-monthly newspaper, New Hampshire Wildlife, and maintains this web presence.

NHWF works very closely with other conservation groups such as the Society for the Protection of New Hampshire Forests, New Hampshire Audubon, The Nature Conservancy, NH Timberland Owners Association, and others. NHWF in the past has held seats on many state boards and commissions charged with oversight of natural resources such as the Forest Advisory Board, SPACE, Conte Wildlife Refuge Advisory Committee, Great Bay National Marine Estuary Advisory Committee and others.

NHWF works closely with the NH Fish and Game Department and help sponsor many programs such as Project Wild and Becoming and Outdoors Woman. As an independent organization, NHWF is often in a position to be vocal and act as an advocate for department issues when the department, as a state government department, cannot speak out.

In February 2009 the NHWF rallied sportspeople from across the state to organize and oppose NH House Bill 559 (HB559). The proposed bill was an attempt to remove the authority of the NH Fish & Game Commission, which helps the executive director oversee the affairs of the NH Fish and Game Department. Additionally this bill sought to force an animal rights activist onto the commission under the guise of more broad representation. The House Committee responsible for Fish and Game, under Chairman Rep. Dennis Abbott voted 15–0 to "ITL" (inexpedient to legislate) or kill the bill. As of this writing, the bill still must go before the House for a vote. The NHWF and its supporters will continue its vigilance to make certain this bill does not move forward. Additional information: and "

== Executive committee ==
The executive committee of the NHWF's board of directors is as follows:

- Jim Morse, president
- Rick Olson, Jr., past president
- Bob Dufresne, vice president
- Mark Edwards, treasurer
- Michael Croteau, secretary
- Ron Sowa, executive director
