= Gun Owners of New Hampshire =

Gun Owners of New Hampshire (GO-NH) is a gun rights organization based in New Hampshire, United States.

GO-NH is the NRA state affiliate organization for New Hampshire.

== See also ==
- National Rifle Association
- Gun politics in the United States
