= William Hatch (New Hampshire politician) =

American politician

Member of the New Hampshire House of Representatives from the Coos 6th district
- In office 2006 – September 18, 2023
- Succeeded by: Michael Murphy

Personal details
- Party: Democratic

William Hatch is a former Democratic member of the New Hampshire House of Representatives.

He resides in Gorham, New Hampshire, and served as vice chair of the House's Ways and Means Committee. He represented the area of Coos County which includes the towns of Gorham and Shelburne, as well as some unincorporated areas.

Hatch resigned in September 2023.
