= List of television stations in New Hampshire =

This is a list of broadcast television stations that are licensed in the U.S. state of New Hampshire.

== Full-power ==
- Stations are arranged by media market served and channel position.

Full-power television stations in New Hampshire
Media market	Station	Channel	Primary affiliation(s)	Notes	Refs
~Boston, Massachusetts	WMUR-TV	9	ABC	(Note: Licensed to Manchester, New Hampshire.)	
~Boston, Massachusetts	WENH-TV	11	PBS	(Note: Licensed to Durham, New Hampshire.)	
~Boston, Massachusetts	WPXG-TV	21	Ion Television	(Note: Licensed to Concord, New Hampshire.) (Note: Satellite of WBPX-TV.)	
~Boston, Massachusetts	WWJE-DT	50	True Crime Network	(Note: Licensed to Derry, New Hampshire.)	
~Boston, Massachusetts	WNEU	60	Telemundo, TeleXitos on 60.2	(Note: Licensed to Merrimack, New Hampshire.)	
~Rural Vermont	WEKW-TV	11	PBS	(Note: Licensed to Keene, New Hampshire.) (Note: Satellite of WENH-TV.)	
~Rural Vermont	WLED-TV	11	PBS	(Note: Licensed to Littleton, New Hampshire.)	

== Low-power ==
Low-power television stations in New Hampshire
Media market	Station	Channel	Primary affiliation(s)	Notes	Refs
~Boston, Massachusetts	WBTS-CD	15	NBC (NBC10 Boston)	(Note: Licensed to Nashua, New Hampshire.)	
~Boston, Massachusetts	WWOO-LD	17	[Blank]	(Note: Licensed to Westmoreland, New Hampshire.)	
~Boston, Massachusetts	WLEK-LD	22	Various		
~Boston, Massachusetts	WVCC-LD	49	Various		
~Albany, New York	WYBM-LD	15	Silent		

== Translators ==
Television station translators in New Hampshire
Media market	Station	Channel	Translating	Notes	Refs
~Rural Vermont	W34DQ-D	11	WENH	(Note: Licensed to Pittsburg, New Hampshire.)	
~Rural Vermont	W36FE-D	11	WENH	(Note: Licensed to Hanover, New Hampshire.)	
~Rural Vermont	WYCU-LD	26	WYCI	(Note: Licensed to Charlestown, New Hampshire.)	

== Defunct ==
- WEDB-TV Berlin (satellite of WENH-TV, 1969–1981)
- WHED-TV Hanover (satellite of WENH-TV, 1968–1981)
- WNHT Concord (1984–1989)
- WRLH Lebanon (1966–1968, 1971–1974)
- WXPO-TV Manchester (1969–1970)
