= List of New Hampshire state prisons =

This is a list of state prisons in New Hampshire overseen by the state Department of Corrections. It does not include federal prisons or county jails located in the state of New Hampshire.

- Lakes Region Facility (closed 2009)
- New Hampshire State Prison for Men
- New Hampshire State Prison for Women
- Northern New Hampshire Correctional Facility
- Shea Farm Halfway House
