= New Hampshire Department of Safety =

Government agency in the U.S. state of New Hampshire

Agency overview
- Formed: January 1, 1962
- Jurisdiction: New Hampshire
- Headquarters: 33 Hazen Drive; Concord, New Hampshire
- Agency executive: Robert L. Quinn, Commissioner
- Website: www.nh.gov/safety/

The New Hampshire Department of Safety is a government agency of the U.S. state of New Hampshire. The Department of Safety is under the executive direction of Commissioner of Safety Robert L. Quinn. The main office of the Department of Safety is located at the James H. Hayes Safety Building in Concord.

== Duties ==
The duties of the Department of Safety are:

- Enforcing the criminal law.
- Administering and enforcing laws relative to motor vehicles and drivers.
- Assuring fire, building, and equipment safety.
- Promoting vehicle and highway safety.
- Administering and enforcing laws relative to emergency medical services.

== History ==
The New Hampshire General Court (state legislature) established the Department of Safety in 1961; it became operational on January 1, 1962, consisting of the divisions of Motor Vehicles, State Police, and Safety Services.

In 1987, the department added the Division of Enforcement, Division of Administration, Bureau of Hearings and the Bureau of Fire Safety. On January 1, 1989, the Bureau of Common Carriers was transferred from the Department of Transportation.

On July 1, 1989, the Division of Fire Service, consisting of the Bureau of Fire Safety, the Bureau of Fire Standards and Training, and the Fire Standards and Training Commission, and became the sixth division of the department. On August 1, 1994, the Division of Fire Service was restructured into two Divisions: the Division of Fire Standards and Training and the Division of Fire Safety.

On October 1, 1996, the Division of Enforcement was eliminated and all former positions and duties were merged into the Division of State Police Bureau of Enforcement. On November 19, 1999, the Bureau of Emergency Medical Services was transferred from the Department of Health and Human Services Office of Community and Public Health and became the Division of Emergency Medical Services.

On July 1, 1999, the Division of Motor Vehicles was approved to hire its own police officers (entitled Inspectors) to reclaim the law enforcement functions that were merged over to the Division of State Police in 1996.

On July 1, 2002, the Emergency Management Agency was transferred from the Office of the Governor and became the Division of Fire Safety and Emergency Management with two Bureaus: Fire Safety and Emergency Management. Also, the Division of Emergency Medical Services merged with the Division of Fire Standards and Training, becoming the Division of Fire Standards and Training and Emergency Medical Services.

On July 17, 2002, the Bureau of Highway Patrol in the Division of Motor Vehicles was created. All Inspectors were retitled to Highway Patrol Officers.

On September 4, 2003, the Bureau of Emergency Communications was transferred from the Department of Administrative Services in the Division of Fire Safety and Emergency Management. The State Fire Marshal became the Bureau Chief of Fire Safety. Also in 2003, the Division of Information Technology was abolished by the General Court when it established the state Office of Information Technology.

On January 1, 2004, the Division of State Police - Forensic Laboratory received the Department of Corrections Drug Testing Laboratory and the Department of Health and Human Services, Division of Public Health's laboratory for the testing of blood, breath, and urine to determine alcohol and controlled drug content; and State Toxicologist office.

On April 17, 2019, the Executive Council unanimously confirmed Robert L. Quinn as Commissioner of the NH Department of Safety.

== Divisions ==
New Hampshire Marine Patrol patch

The Department of Safety is made up of seven divisions along with their respective bureaus, as listed below. The department has a Commissioner's Office, headed by the commissioner and assistant commissioner, that oversees the management team, Bureau of Hearings, Homeland Security Grants, Public Information Officer, and Railroad Police. There is also an Office of Highway Safety, responsible for oversight of a statewide highway safety program.

- Division of Administration – Bureau of Road Toll
- Division of Emergency Services and Communications – Bureau of Emergency Communication (911)
- Division of Fire Safety – Office of the State Fire Marshal, Fire Investigations Unit, Fireworks and Modular Buildings Standards Program
- Division of Fire Standards and Training and Emergency Medical Services – Bureau of Firefighter Training, Bureau of Certification and Support, and Bureau of Emergency Medical Services
- Division of Homeland Security and Emergency Management – state-level planning related to all emergencies and disasters
- Division of Motor Vehicles – Bureau of Registration, Driver Education, Bureau of Driver Licensing, Bureau of Financial Responsibility, Bureau of Title and Anti-Theft, Emissions, International Registration Plan, Motorcycle Rider Program, New Motor Vehicle Arbitration (Lemon Law), Non-US Citizen
- Division of State Police – New Hampshire State Police, including a Criminal Records Unit, Permits & Licensing Unit, and the New Hampshire Marine Patrol

== See also ==
- List of law enforcement agencies in New Hampshire
