= Joshua Adjutant =

American politician (born 1995)

Josh Adjutant

Member of the New Hampshire House of Representatives from the Grafton 17th district
- In office December 5, 2018 – April 1, 2023
- Preceded by: Stephen Darrow
- Succeeded by: David Fracht

Personal details
- Born: 1995 (age 30–31) Lebanon, New Hampshire, U.S.
- Party: Democratic
- Education: Newfound Regional High School; Plymouth State University

Joshua Adjutant (born 1995) is a former New Hampshire politician.

== Early life ==
Adjutant was born in Lebanon, New Hampshire in 1995.

== Education ==
Adjutant graduated from Newfound Regional High School in 2013. Adjutant attended Plymouth State University.

== Professional career ==
On November 6, 2018, Adjutant was elected to the New Hampshire House of Representatives where he represented the Grafton 17 district. Adjutant assumed office on December 5, 2018. Adjutant is a Democrat. Adjutant endorsed Bernie Sanders in the 2020 Democratic Party presidential primaries.

On March 27, 2023, while working as a security guard at Dartmouth-Hitchcock Medical Center, he was assaulted by a patient, which resulted in him suffering a head injury. Due to this, he resigned from the state House on April 1.

== Personal life ==
Adjutant resides in Enfield, New Hampshire.
