= New Hampshire Retirement System =

Government pension plan in the U.S. state of New Hampshire

New Hampshire Retirement System (NHRS)
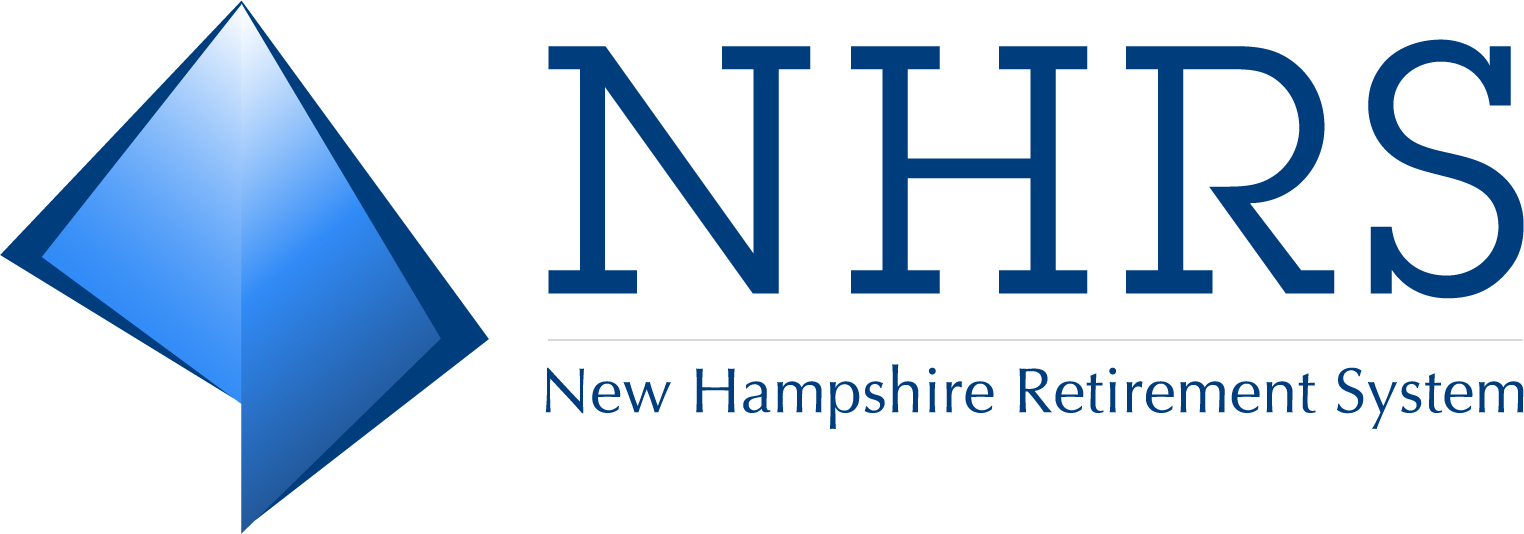

Agency overview
- Formed: January 1, 1968
- Jurisdiction: New Hampshire
- Headquarters: 54 Regional Drive; Concord, New Hampshire
- Agency executive: Timothy Lesko, Board of Trustees Chair
- Website: www.nhrs.org

The New Hampshire Retirement System (NHRS) is a contributory, public employee defined benefit pension plan for the state of New Hampshire. The plan is qualified under section 401(a) of the Internal Revenue Code, and provides lifetime pension benefits to eligible members, which are determined at retirement under formulas prescribed by state law (RSA 100-A). The retirement system is also governed by administrative rules, policies adopted by the Board of Trustees, and the Internal Revenue Code.

== Membership ==
NHRS members are full-time state, county, and municipal employees, teachers, police officers, and firefighters. Membership consists of two groups: Group I (Employee & Teacher) and Group II (Police & Fire).

As of June 30, 2019, NHRS had approximately 48,000 active members and approximately 38,000 retirees or beneficiaries collecting a pension.

== Funding ==
NHRS benefits are funded by member contributions, employer contributions, and net investment returns. Investment returns have historically provided the bulk of funding for pension benefits. Article 36-a of the New Hampshire Constitution protects trust fund assets for the exclusive purpose of providing benefits; requires Trustees to set actuarially sound employer contribution rates; and requires employers to pay those rates in full.

The retirement system trust fund stood at $9.21 billion as of June 30, 2019.

== Oversight ==
NHRS is overseen by a 13-member board of trustees, which includes at least one teacher, one firefighter, one police officer, four members of the public, and the New Hampshire State Treasurer. Unlike other state agencies, NHRS is not structured under the executive branch, it is "a component unit of the state governed by statute". Other than the State Treasurer, board members are nominated by the Governor of New Hampshire for three-year terms and must be confirmed by the Governor's Council.
