= Plug-in electric vehicles in New Hampshire =

As of 2021, there were about 4,600 electric vehicles registered in New Hampshire, accounting for 0.3% of all vehicles in the state.

== Government policy ==
As of April 2022, the state government offers tax incentives of up to $1,600 for electric vehicle purchases.

== Charging stations ==
As of April 2024, there were 230 public charging station locations in New Hampshire. As of 2019, there were five public DC charging stations in New Hampshire.

The Infrastructure Investment and Jobs Act, signed into law in November 2021, allocates US$17 million to charging stations in New Hampshire.

As of October 2022, the state government recognizes I-89 and I-93 as potential charging station corridors, with plans for charging stations every 50 miles (80 km).
