= Law of New Hampshire =

State laws of New Hampshire, United States of America

The law of New Hampshire is the state law of the U.S. state of New Hampshire. It consists of the Constitution of the State of New Hampshire, as well as the New Hampshire Revised Statutes Annotated, the New Hampshire Code of Administrative Rules, and precedents of the state courts.

== Revised Statutes Annotated ==
The Revised Statutes Annotated (RSA) are a work published by Thomson West and are a revision of the Revised Laws (RL) of 1942. Originally ratified in 1955, the RSA is a codification of general and public laws of the state.
