= Solar power in New Hampshire =

Overview of solar power in the U.S. state of New Hampshire

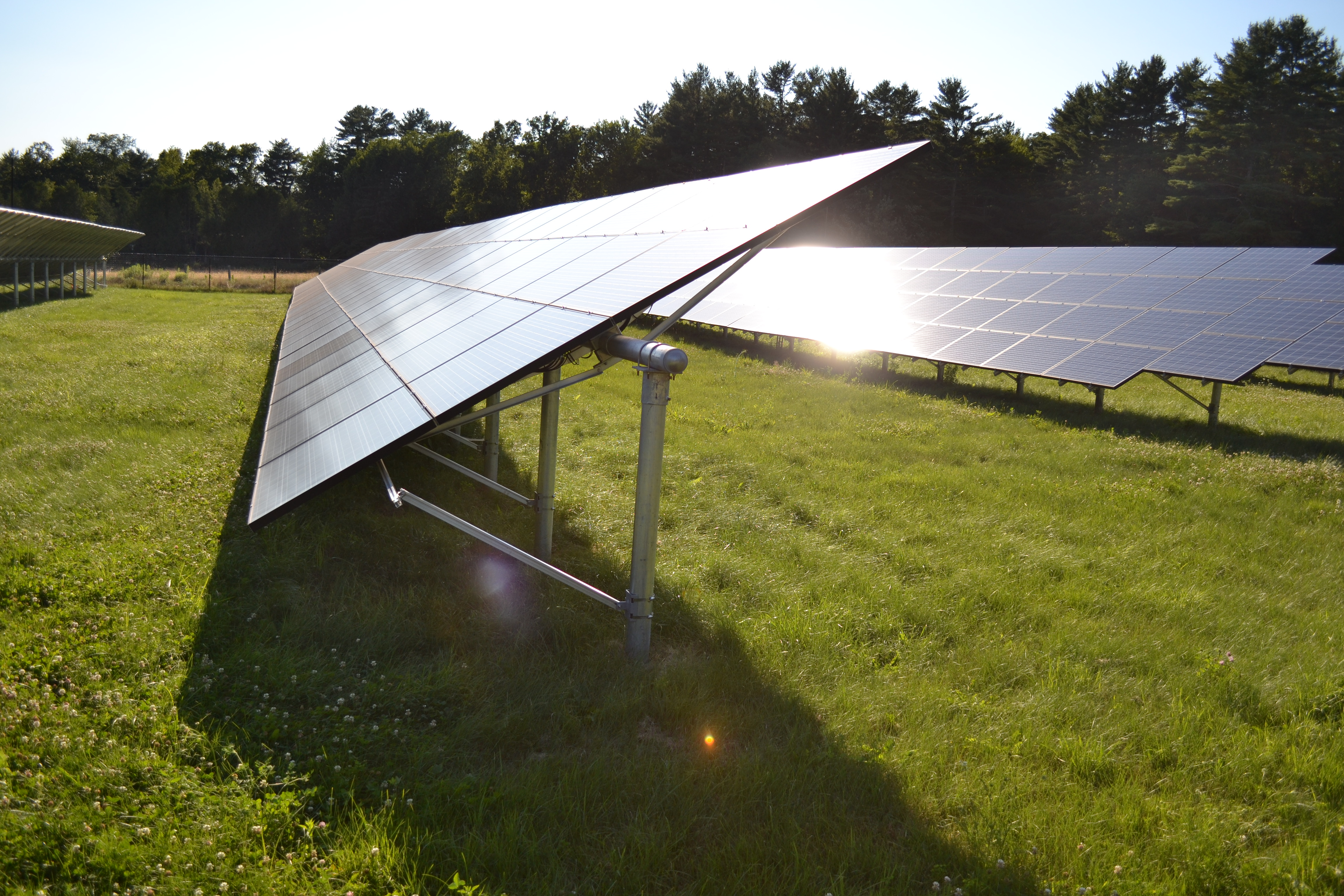
Exeter High School 98 kW solar array

Solar power in New Hampshire provides a small percentage of the state's electricity. State renewable requirements and declining prices have led to some installations. Photovoltaics on rooftops can provide 53.4% of all electricity used in New Hampshire, from 5,300 MW of solar panels, and 72% of the electricity used in Concord. A 2016 estimate suggested that a typical 5 kW system costing $25,000 before credits and utility savings would pay for itself in nine years, and generate a profit of $34,196 over the rest of its 25-year life. A loan or lease provides a net savings each year, including the first year. New Hampshire's solar installation lagged behind nearby states such as Vermont and New York, which in 2013 had 10 times and 25 times more solar, respectively.

Net metering is available for up to 1 MW generation, but is capped at 50 MW. Excess generation is perpetually rolled over each month, and customers can elect to be paid at avoided cost once a year. The organization Freeing the Grid gave the state a B for net metering and a D for interconnection. The state renewable portfolio standard calls for 25% of electricity from renewable energy in 2025, including 0.3% from solar. Noncompliance fees are used to fund renewable energy, and resulted in payments of $1.3 million in 2009 and $2.6 million in 2010. A 2014 review by the state found the "business-as-usual" model predicted that the state's 2025 goals would not be met.

In 2005, New Hampshire's largest solar array was the 50 kW installation on the roof of the Stonyfield Farm yogurt factory. It remained the largest in the state until PSNH installed a 51 kW array on their roof in 2009. In 2012, New Hampshire's largest solar array was the 525 kW facility on the top level of the Manchester Airport parking garage. It was removed because of glare, and was reinstalled with the panels facing east instead of south. Additional panels were installed to maintain the same output. In 2022, Manchester became home to what was at the time the state's largest municipal solar array, which will generate 3.8 million kilowatt-hours a year. The facility is located on top of a closed landfill.

In a pilot program, a solar panel was installed on a few utility poles, four in Nashua and four in Berlin, but the program was not continued.

== Installed capacity ==
Source: NREL

Grid-connected PV capacity (MW)
Year	Capacity	Installed	% change
2007	0.1		
2008	0.1		
2009	0.7	0.5	600%
2010	2.0	1.3	186%
2011	3.1	1.0	55%
2012	5.4	2.3	74%
2013	9.6	4.1	75%
2014	7	3	75%
2015	22	15	214%
2016	54	32	145%
2017	76	22	41%
2018	90	14	18%
2019	113	23	25%
2020	132.9	19.9	17%
2021	164.8	31.9	%
2022	201	36.2	%
2023	--	--	%
2024	--	--	%
2025	354	--	%

== See also ==
- Wind power in New Hampshire
- Solar power in the United States
- Renewable energy in the United States
