= Music of New Hampshire =

New Hampshire is a state of the United States, located in the New England region. It is home to several professional performing institutions, including the more than 90-year-old fully professional Symphony New Hampshire (known from 1923 to 2012 as the Nashua Symphony) based out of Nashua, and the community-based New Hampshire Philharmonic.

The state of New Hampshire is unusual for having nine state songs.

== State song ==
List of state songs
Song	Date	Creators
Old New Hampshire	1949	words by Dr. John F. Holmes music by Maurice Hoffmann
New Hampshire, My New Hampshire	1963	words by Julius Richelson music by Walter P. Smith
New Hampshire Hills	1973	words by Paul Scott Mowrer music by Tom Powers
Autumn in New Hampshire	1977	words and music by Leo Austin
New Hampshire’s Granite State	1977	words and music by Anne B. Currier
Oh, New Hampshire (You’re My Home)	1977	words and music by Brownie McIntosh
The Old Man of the Mountain	1977	words and music by Paul Belanger
The New Hampshire State March	1977	words and music by Rene Richards
New Hampshire Naturally	1983	words and music by Rick Shaw and Ron Shaw

New Hampshire has nine state songs, although eight are "honorary" but not "official".

The first state song was "Old New Hampshire". This song was originally voted on by the legislature in 1941, but the song lost. In 1943, Rep. Samuel P. Philbrook sponsored legislation to create a contest to pick a state song, but this initiative failed as well. It was not until 1949 that "Old New Hampshire" became an official song.

The second was "New Hampshire, My New Hampshire" in 1963, then "New Hampshire Hills" in 1973. In early 1977, "Autumn in New Hampshire" became the fourth official song, and an interim board appointed by legislators recommended using only one official song and designating the others "honorary" state songs.

The board began considering which song to make official, as well as adding four new songs to consideration: "Oh, New Hampshire (You're My Home)", "The Old Man of the Mountain", "New Hampshire's Granite State" and "The New Hampshire State March". "Old New Hampshire" was voted the official song in late 1977, and the others became "honorary".

In 1983, a new honorary state song was added: "New Hampshire Naturally".

== Rock music ==
The rock band Aerosmith has its roots in New Hampshire, as lead singer Steven Tyler and guitarist Joe Perry spent their childhood summers in Sunapee. Other notable bands include The Bruisers, Dreadnaught USA, Our Last Night, Scissorfight, The Shaggs, And Then There Were None, Rick Rude, The Trichomes, The Brave Little Abacus, and The Queers. Punk rocker GG Allin was native to New Hampshire. Singer-songwriter Ray LaMontagne was born in Nashua, Ronnie James Dio, lead singer of Dio, was born in Portsmouth, and The Dropkick Murphys lead singer Al Barr was born in Hanover.

== Pop music ==
Mandy Moore, a singer-songwriter and actress born in Nashua, has sold more than 10 million albums worldwide and won various awards for her acting performances. Singer JoJo was raised in Keene and is the youngest solo artist to top the Billboard Pop Songs chart. She has sold over 7 million albums worldwide.

== Hip-hop music ==
New Hampshire has been home to producer and DJ Statik Selektah, a respected name in hip hop nationwide, since the 1990s. Statik Selektah, of Exeter, is closely associated with hip-hop artist Termanology of Lawrence, Massachusetts. The two have formed 1982 (group). Producer and artist AzizTheShake of Nashua began solely as an artist and has since produced for Drake ("Plot Twist"), extensively for J. Cole, as well as Burna Boy, Central Cee, Gunna, BIA, AP Dhillon, Ab-Soul, Key Glock, The Game, Luciano, Sfera Ebbasta and many others. Producer Decap of Nashua began producing in the early 2000s and has since produced records for artists like Talib Kweli, Joyner Lucas, and Hit-Boy. Bass player/producer Brady Watt, also a Nashua native, has worked closely alongside Ski Beatz, providing bass guitar on albums and songs by New Orleans rapper Curren$y, Joey Badass, and others. Rapper Adeem hails from Keene. Grammy Award-winning producer Brian Soko from Manchester has produced records for Beyoncé ("Drunk in Love"), and Lil Wayne.

== Classical ==
Composer Amy Beach was born in Henniker.

Composer Edward MacDowell and his wife Marian summered at Hillcrest Farm in Peterborough at the turn of the 20th century. In 1907, toward the end of Edward's life, Marian deeded the farm to the Edward MacDowell Association, founding the MacDowell Colony, an artists' colony which has hosted numerous composers, artists, and writers up to the present day.

== Vocal music ==
New Hampshire communities support a widespread and active tradition of choirs and local singing groups from master chorale to neighborhood singing clubs. Providing opportunities for performances in regular concerts and seasonal festivals for amateurs and professionals alike, vocal musical offerings are attended in an assortment of venues around the state. School choirs and their professional educators create an early love for singing that supports participation. Barbershop music is a popular pursuit in every corner of the state. Abenaki singers are often featured at seasonal Native American powwows.

== See also ==
- Indigenous music of North America#Eastern Woodlands
