= New Hampshire State Police =

State Police of New Hampshire

- Patch of New Hampshire State Police

- Flag of New Hampshire State Police
- Abbreviation: NHSP

Agency overview
- Formed: June 29, 1937; 89 years ago
- Employees: 504 (as of 2014)

Jurisdictional structure
- Operations jurisdiction: New Hampshire, USA
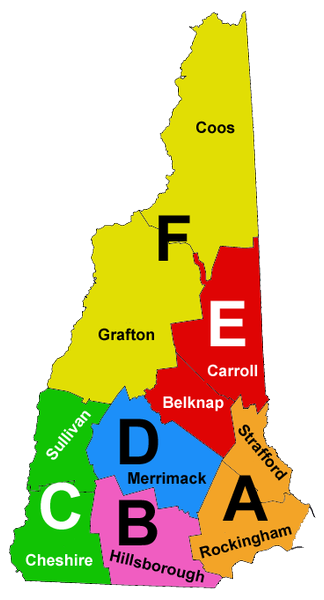
- New Hampshire State Police Troops
- Area: 9,350 square miles (24,200 km^{2})
- Population: 1,316,470 (2010 Census)
- General nature: Civilian police

Operational structure
- Headquarters: Concord, New Hampshire
- Troopers: 405 (as of 2020)
- Civilian members: 175 (as of 2014)
- Agency executive: Colonel Mark B. Hall, Director
- Parent agency: New Hampshire Department of Safety
- Child agency: New Hampshire Hospital Security

Facilities
- Stations: Troop
- Airbases: 7

Website
- NH State Police site

The New Hampshire State Police is a state police agency within the Department of Safety of the U.S. state of New Hampshire. Police employees of the State Police are ex officio constables and have the primary role of patrolling the state highways, enforcing the laws and regulations of the highway and motor vehicles, providing law enforcement for municipalities with no or part time coverage, and regulations relating to the transportation of hazardous materials. The jurisdiction of the State Police is generally throughout the state of New Hampshire (although see the caveat below with regard to towns of more than 3,000 or any city).

The State Police utilizes an APCO Project-25 Digital Radio System. Some of the State Police dispatch centers provide primary dispatch for some communities in the state.

== Jurisdiction ==
New Hampshire RSA 106-B:15 sets out that troopers have primary jurisdiction on all turnpikes, toll roads, limited access highways, interstate highways and towns without full time police coverage.

A State Police trooper has a more restricted jurisdiction in towns of more than 3,000 or any city. Within any such place a trooper may only act when:

- enforcing motor vehicle laws or the regulations relative to the transportation of hazardous materials;
- witnessing a crime;
- is in pursuit of a law violator or suspected violator;
- in search of a person wanted for a crime committed outside its limits;
- in search of a witness of such crime;
- is faced with public safety exigent circumstances;
- acting as an agent of the director of motor vehicles enforcing rules pertaining to driver licenses, registrations and the inspection of motor vehicles;
- requested to act by an official of another law enforcement agency;
- ordered by the governor.

== Troop barracks ==
Troop A: Epping

- Rockingham County
- Strafford County

Troop B: Bedford

- Hillsborough County

Troop C: Keene

- Cheshire County
- Sullivan County

Troop D: Concord

- Merrimack County

Troop E: Tamworth

- Belknap County
- Carroll County

Troop F: Twin Mountain

- Coos County
- Grafton County

Troop G: Concord (formerly the New Hampshire Highway Patrol)

- Statewide
  - Commercial vehicle/hazmat enforcement
  - DMV-specific missions relating to inspections, licenses, pupil transportation, registrations, auto dealers, and more
  - Overlap coverage and provide extra troopers to other Troop Stations as needed

== Field Operations Bureau ==
Marine Patrol

== History ==
The NHSP has absorbed smaller law enforcement groups such as the Gaming Enforcement unit and the State Hospital Security, incorporating the 55 police officers of the Division of Enforcement in 1996. In 2008 the eighty officers of the New Hampshire Highway Patrol of the Division of Motor Vehicles were merged into State Police. This latest merger has swelled the NH State Police to approximately 380 troopers.

On April 8, 2020, Colonel Nathan Noyes was sworn in as director of the New Hampshire State Police, replacing Colonel Christopher Wagner, who retired after three years in the position. Noyes is the son of NHSP Sergeant James Noyes, who was killed in the line of duty on October 3, 1994.

== Fallen officers ==
Since the establishment of the New Hampshire State Police, ten officers have died in the line of duty.

== See also ==
- List of law enforcement agencies in New Hampshire
- State police
- Highway patrol
