= Abortion in New Hampshire =

Abortion in New Hampshire is legal up to the 24th week of pregnancy as of January 1, 2022, when a new law went into effect. Prior to this, the gestational limit was unclear. Abortion was criminalized in the state by 1900. In June 2003, the state passed a parental notification law, repealing it four years later before passing a new one in 2011. New Hampshire then passed a law in 2012 which required minors to wait 48 hours after requesting an abortion but no longer required parental consent. New Hampshire law regarding abortion has been heard before the US Supreme Court in the case Ayotte v. Planned Parenthood of Northern New England in 2006. The number of abortion clinics in New Hampshire has declined over the years, with 18 in 1982, 16 in 1992 and four in 2014. In 2010, there were three publicly funded abortions in the state; all three were federally funded. There are both active abortion rights and anti-abortion rights activists in the state.

== History ==
=== Legislative history ===
By the end of the 1800s, all states in the union (except Louisiana) had therapeutic exceptions in their legislative bans on abortions. In the 19th century, bans on abortion by state legislatures focused on protecting the life of the mother given the number of deaths caused by abortions; state governments viewed themselves as protecting the lives of their citizens. In 1997, then-Governor Jeanne Shaheen signed legislation repealing most of the abortion restrictions in place.

In June 2003, the New Hampshire Parental Notification Prior to Abortion Act, "an act requiring parental notification before abortions may be performed on unemancipated minors", was narrowly passed by the New Hampshire General Court. This law was repealed in 2007, making rehearing at the district court level moot. The New Hampshire parental notification law was passed again in 2011 after the Republican-controlled House and Senate overrode Democratic governor John Lynch's veto. In 2011 and 2012, dozens of abortion-related bills were submitted but failed to pass. These included attempts to define a fetus as a person when a pregnant woman was murdered (for example the Lacey Peterson case). A bill passed the House by a vote of 190–109 in 2012 that failed to become law that would have prevented women from getting abortions after the 20th week of gestation. Another 2012 bill that failed to pass sought to prevent religious societies from being required to offer insurance requiring them to pay for contraception. New Hampshire passed a parental consent-related law in 2012. The law had no impact on the number of abortions performed on minors, only increasing the frequency of parental participation in the process. It also did not create a situation where New Hampshire minors sought abortions out of state. The new law required minors to wait 48 hours after requesting an abortion but no longer required parental consent.

Legislators continued introducing bills restricting abortion in the New Hampshire General Court, with more than 30 bills coming before the body between 2015 and 2019. Only a fetal homicide bill was signed by Governor Chris Sununu, which was passed in 2017.

As of 2017, California, Oregon, Montana, Vermont, and New Hampshire allowed qualified non-physician health professionals, such as physicians' assistants, nurse practitioners, and certified nurse midwives, to perform first-trimester aspiration abortions and to prescribe drugs for medical abortions. In 2018, New Hampshire was one of eleven states where the legislature introduced a bill that would have banned abortion in almost all cases. It did not pass. Parental notification laws were still on the books in May 2018. On January 1, 2022, a bill passed that required patients receiving abortion care at a health center in New Hampshire to have an ultrasound.

On December 5, 2023, Republicans filed a bill that would ban abortion after 15 days of gestation "other than for a medical emergency". The bill had been pre-filed in September, but the text was not made public until December 5. The bill was tabled indefinitely by a 363-11 majority.

=== Judicial history ===
The 1973 US Supreme Court's decision in the Roe v. Wade ruling meant the state could no longer regulate abortion in the first trimester. However, the Supreme Court overturned Roe v. Wade in Dobbs v. Jackson Women's Health Organization, No. 19-1392, 597 U.S. ___ (2022) later in 2022.

The US Supreme Court heard Ayotte v. Planned Parenthood of Northern New England in 2006. On November 17, 2003, Planned Parenthood of Northern New England, the Concord Feminist Health Center, the Feminist Health Center of Portsmouth, and Wayne Goldner, M.D. filed a complaint under 42 U.S.C. § 1983, seeking a declaratory judgment that the Parental Notification Act was unconstitutional and a preliminary injunction to prevent its enforcement once it became effective. On December 29, 2003, Judge Joseph A. Diclerico Jr. of the U.S. District Court for the District of New Hampshire issued an order finding the Parental Notification Act unconstitutional and permanently enjoining its enforcement.

New Hampshire Attorney General Peter Heed appealed the district court's order to the United States Court of Appeals for the First Circuit. Heed argued that the court should apply the "no set of circumstances" standard set forth in United States v. Salerno, 481 U.S. 739 (1987). A three judge panel composed of Chief Judge Michael Boudin, Circuit Judge Juan R. Torruella and District Judge Saris unanimously affirmed the judgment by Judge DiClerico for the same reasons he stated.

Attorney General Kelly Ayotte, who replaced Heed in 2004, appealed the case to the Supreme Court of the United States over the objections of former Governor Craig Benson's successor, Governor John Lynch. The Supreme Court granted certiorari to review the case, which was the first case challenging an abortion law that the Court had accepted in five years. Lynch subsequently submitted an amicus curiae brief in opposition to the Parental Notification Act. The Court vacated the judgment of the First Circuit in a unanimous decision authored by Associate Justice Sandra Day O'Connor.

=== Clinic history ===
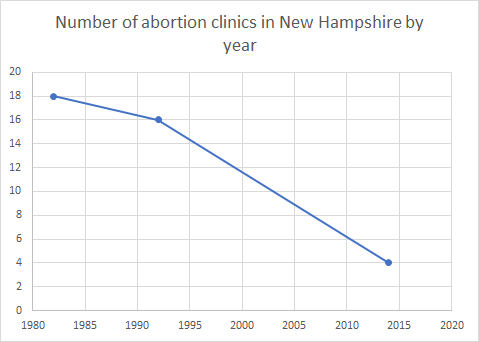
Number of abortion clinics in New Hampshire by year

Equality Health Center was established in downtown Concord in 1973, shortly after abortion became legal after the Roe v. Wade ruling. Between 1982 and 1992, the number of abortion clinics in the state decreased by two, going from 18 in 1982 to 16 in 1992. In the period between 1992 and 1996, the state saw no change in the total number of abortion clinics. While only three states saw gains in this period, this state was one of four to see no changes, with 16 abortion clinics in the state in 1996. In 2014 in New Hampshire, there were twelve facilities providing abortions, of which four were abortion clinics. In 2014, 60% of the counties in the state did not have an abortion clinic. That year, 30% of women in the state aged 15 – 44 lived in a county without an abortion clinic. In March 2016, there were five Planned Parenthood clinics in the state. In 2017, there were five Planned Parenthood clinics in a state with a population of 290,369 women aged 15 – 49, of which two offered abortion services.

== Statistics ==
In the period between 1972 and 1974, there were zero recorded illegal abortion deaths in the state. In 1990, 145,000 women in the state faced the risk of an unintended pregnancy. Alaska, California, and New Hampshire did not voluntarily provide the Centers for Disease Control (CDC) with abortion related data in 2000. All three states also failed to provide abortion-related statistics to the CDC the following year. In 2014, 66% of adults said in a poll by the Pew Research Center that abortion should be legal in all or most cases. The 2023 American Values Atlas reported that, in their most recent survey, 74% of people from New Hampshire said that abortion should be legal in all or most cases. In 2017, the state had an infant mortality rate of 4.2 deaths per 1,000 live births.

Number of reported abortions, abortion rate and percentage change in rate by geographic region and state in 1992, 1995 and 1996
Census division and state	Number			Rate			% change 1992–1996
Census division and state	1992	1995	1996	1992	1995	1996	% change 1992–1996
Total	1,528,930	1,363,690	1,365,730	25.9	22.9	22.9	–12
New England	78,360	71,940	71,280	25.2	23.6	23.5	–7
Connecticut	19,720	16,680	16,230	26.2	23	22.5	–14
Maine	4,200	2,690	2,700	14.7	9.6	9.7	–34
Massachusetts	40,660	41,190	41,160	28.4	29.2	29.3	3
New Hampshire	3,890	3,240	3,470	14.6	12	12.7	–13
Rhode Island	6,990	5,720	5,420	30	25.5	24.4	–19

== Abortion financing ==
As of May 2018, women could obtain public funding for abortions in three specific cases: if her life was in danger, when the pregnancy is a result of rape, or if the pregnancy is a result of incest. As of May 2019, state Medicaid rules prohibited the use of state Medicaid funding for abortion services except in those three formentioned cases. In 2010, the state had three publicly funded abortions which were federally funded.

As of February 2021, New Hampshire residents may receive financial aid for abortion procedures through The Reproductive Freedom Fund of New Hampshire.

== Abortion rights views and activities ==
=== Protests ===
Women from New Hampshire participated in marches supporting abortion rights as part of a #StoptheBans movement in May 2019.

Following the overturn of Roe v. Wade on June 24, 2022, hundreds of abortion rights protesters rallied and marched in Manchester, Exeter, Keene and Portsmouth.

== Anti-abortion views and activities ==
=== Violence ===
On July 3, 1989, a fire was started at the Feminist Health Center clinic in Concord, New Hampshire, on the day the U.S. Supreme Court upheld a Missouri law banning funding of public facilities as related to abortion. The clinic was set afire again on May 28, 2000, resulting in several thousand dollars' worth of damage. The case remains unsolved. This was the second case of arson at the clinic. On October 22, 2015, a Planned Parenthood clinic in Claremont, New Hampshire, was vandalized by a juvenile intruder. Damaged in the attack were computers, furniture, plumbing fixtures, office equipment, medical equipment, phone lines, windows, and walls. The flooding that resulted from the vandalism also damaged an adjacent business. The acts of violence have been denounced by the NH Right to Life organization.
