= Ayotte v. Planned Parenthood of Northern New England =

- Supreme Court of the United States

Argued November 30, 2005 Decided January 18, 2006
- Full case name: Kelly A. Ayotte, Attorney General of New Hampshire v. Planned Parenthood of Northern New England, et al.
- Docket no.: 04-1144
- Citations: 546 U.S. 320 (more) 126 S.Ct. 961; 163 L. Ed. 2d 812; 2006 U.S. LEXIS 912; 74 USLW 4091; 06 Cal. Daily Op. Serv. 467; 2006 Daily Journal D.A.R. 667; 19 Fla. L. Weekly Fed. S 67

Case history
- Prior: Motion for permanent injunction granted, sub nom., Planned Parenthood v. Heed, 296 F.Supp.2d 59 (D.N.H. 2003), affirmed, 390 F.3d 53 (1st Cir. 2004); cert. granted, sub nom., Ayotte v. Planned Parenthood, 544 U.S. 1048 (2005).

Holding
- Completely invalidating a parental notification statute was unnecessary if its potentially unconstitutional applications could be addressed by more targeted judicial remedies. First Circuit Court of Appeals vacated and remanded.

Court membership
- Chief Justice John Roberts Associate Justices John P. Stevens · Sandra Day O'Connor; Antonin Scalia · Anthony Kennedy; David Souter · Clarence Thomas; Ruth Bader Ginsburg · Stephen Breyer

Case opinion
- Majority: O'Connor, joined by unanimous

Laws applied
- N.H. Rev. Stat. §§ 132:24-132:28 (Supp. 2004) (Parental Notification Prior to Abortion Act)
- Superseded by
- Dobbs v. Jackson Women's Health Organization (2022)

Ayotte v. Planned Parenthood of Northern New England, 546 U.S. 320 (2006), was a decision by the Supreme Court of the United States involving a facial challenge to New Hampshire's parental notification abortion law. The First Circuit had ruled that the law was unconstitutional and an injunction against its enforcement was proper. The Supreme Court vacated this judgment and remanded the case, but avoided a substantive ruling on the challenged law or a reconsideration of prior Supreme Court abortion precedent. Instead, the Court only addressed the issue of remedy, holding that invalidating a statute in its entirety "is not always necessary or justified, for lower courts may be able to render narrower declaratory and injunctive relief."

The opinion was delivered by Justice Sandra Day O'Connor, who had been significantly responsible for developing the Court's recent abortion jurisprudence. This decision was O'Connor's last opinion on the Court before her retirement on January 31, 2006.

== Background ==
In June, 2003, the New Hampshire Parental Notification Prior to Abortion Act, "an act requiring parental notification before abortions may be performed on unemancipated minors," was narrowly passed by the New Hampshire General Court. It was signed into law on June 19, 2003, by Governor Craig Benson, who had lobbied heavily for the law, with an effective date of December 31, 2003.

=== District Court proceedings ===
On November 17, 2003, Planned Parenthood of Northern New England, Concord Feminist Health Center of Portsmouth, Feminist Health Center of Portsmouth, and Wayne Goldner, M.D. filed a complaint under 42 U.S.C. § 1983, seeking a declaratory judgment that the Parental Notification Act was unconstitutional and a preliminary injunction to prevent its enforcement once it became effective. On December 29, 2003, Judge Joseph A. DiClerico, Jr. of the U.S. District Court for the District of New Hampshire issued an order finding the Parental Notification Act unconstitutional and permanently enjoining its enforcement.

DiClerico found the Act unconstitutional on the following grounds:

- the Act's lack of an explicit exception to protect the health of the pregnant minor, and
- the narrowness of the Act's exception for abortions necessary to prevent the minor's death

DiClerico declined to rule on the plaintiffs' other claim, that the Act was unconstitutional for failing to provide specific protections for the confidentiality of a minor seeking a judicial waiver.

=== Court of Appeals decision ===
New Hampshire Attorney General Peter Heed appealed the district court's order to the United States Court of Appeals for the First Circuit. Heed argued that the court should apply the "no set of circumstances" standard set forth in United States v. Salerno, 481 U.S. 739 (1987). A three judge panel composed of Chief Judge Michael Boudin, Circuit Judge Juan R. Torruella and District Judge Saris unanimously affirmed the judgment by Judge DiClerico for the same reasons he stated.

== Opinion of the Court ==
Attorney General and future U.S. senator Kelly Ayotte, who replaced Heed in 2004, appealed the case to the Supreme Court of the United States over the objections of Benson's successor, Governor John Lynch. The Supreme Court granted certiorari to review the case, which was the first case challenging an abortion law that the Court had accepted in five years. Lynch subsequently submitted an amicus curiae brief in opposition to the Parental Notification Act.

The Court vacated the judgment of the First Circuit in a unanimous decision authored by Associate Justice Sandra Day O'Connor. The Court did not revisit any abortion precedents, such as its decision in Casey.

=== O'Connor's unanimous opinion ===
In its ruling the Court found that the following three propositions were established:

1. "States have the right to require parental involvement when a minor considers terminating her pregnancy."
2. "A State may not restrict access to abortions that are 'necessary, in appropriate medical judgment for preservation of the life or health of the mother.' Planned Parenthood of Southeastern Pa. v. Casey, 505 U. S. 833, 879 (plurality opinion)."
3. "New Hampshire has not taken issue with the case's factual basis: In a very small percentage of cases, pregnant minors need immediate abortions to avert serious and often irreversible damage to their health. New Hampshire has conceded that, under this Court's cases, it would be unconstitutional to apply the Act in a manner that subjects minors to significant health risks."

The Court considered under what circumstances federal courts can enjoin enforcement of abortion laws if in some cases such laws would have the effect of regulating abortion more strictly than is consistent with Supreme Court precedent, as the New Hampshire law did in some circumstances.

The Court ruled that in such circumstances facial invalidation of a statute would be inappropriate if the statute could be narrowed sufficiently by judicial interpretation. It raised the question of what the appropriate judicial remedy would be if a statute's enforcement would be unconstitutional in medical emergencies. The court ruled that "invalidating the statute entirely is not always necessary or justified, for lower courts may be able to render narrower declaratory and injunctive relief."

== Subsequent developments ==
The New Hampshire law was repealed in 2007, making rehearing at the district court level moot.

The New Hampshire parental notification law was passed again in 2011 after the Republican-controlled House and Senate overrode then-Democratic governor John Lynch's veto.

== See also ==
- Abortion in the United States
- Abortion law
- Roe v. Wade
- Abortion debate
