= Papagiannis =

Papagiannis (also spelled Pappagianis) (Greek: Παπαγιάννης) is a Greek surname. It can refer to:

- George S. Pappagianis (1924–2017), American politician, Attorney General of New Hampshire
- Georgios Papagiannis (born 1997), Greek basketball player
- Ithaka Darin Pappas (Pappagianis) (born 1966) Californian multidisciplinary artist
- Manthos Papagiannis, 16th century Greek noble and revolutionary
- Theodoros Papagiannis (born 1942), Greek sculptor
