= Louis C. Wyman =

American politician (1917–2002)

Louis Wyman
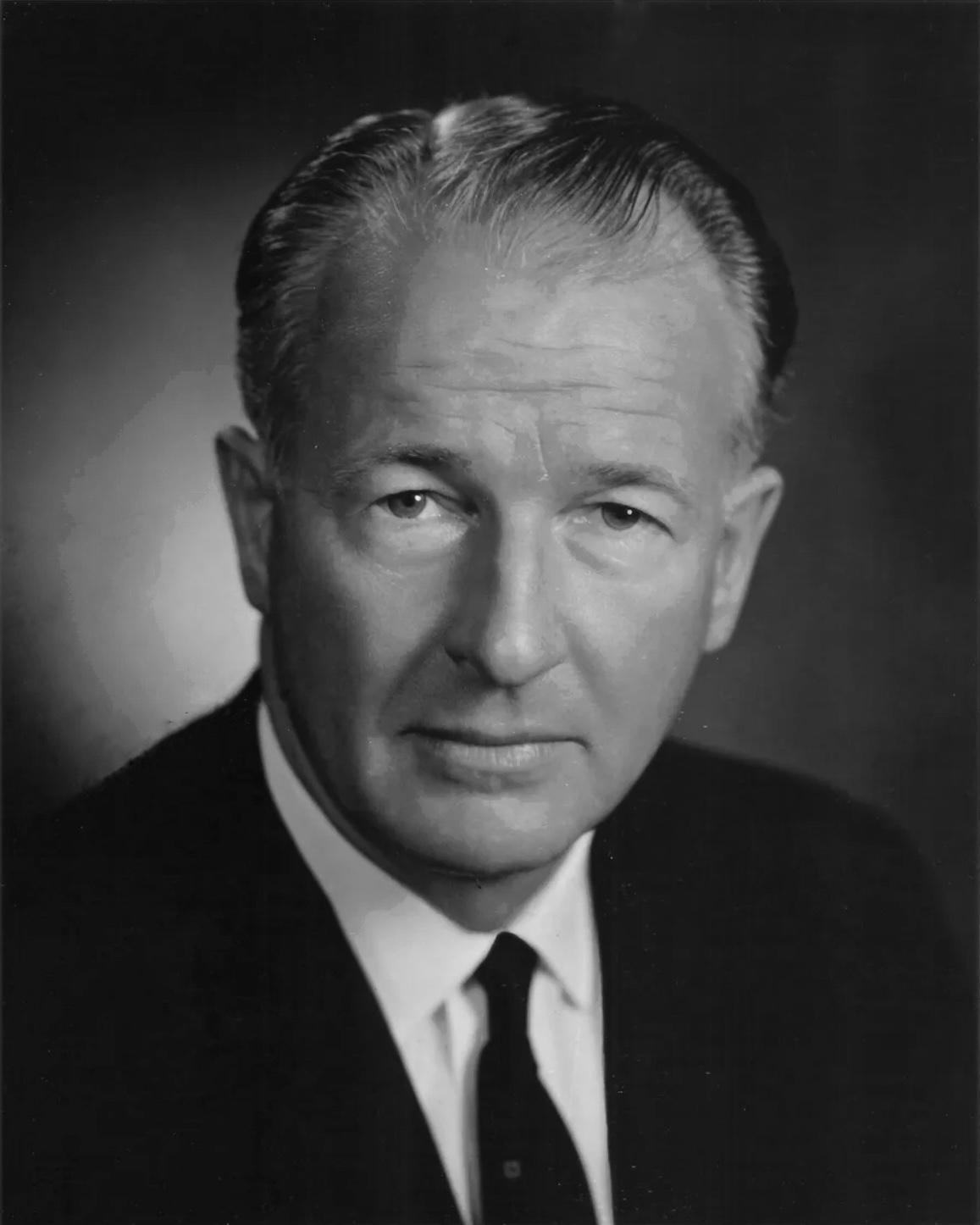
- Wyman in 1972

United States Senator from New Hampshire
- In office December 31, 1974 – January 3, 1975
- Appointed by: Meldrim Thomson Jr.
- Preceded by: Norris Cotton
- Succeeded by: Norris Cotton

Member of the U.S. House of Representatives from New Hampshire's 1st district
- In office January 3, 1967 – December 31, 1974
- Preceded by: Joseph Oliva Huot
- Succeeded by: Norman D'Amours
- In office January 3, 1963 – January 3, 1965
- Preceded by: Charles Earl Merrow
- Succeeded by: Joseph Oliva Huot

Attorney General of New Hampshire
- In office January 15, 1953 – February 2, 1961
- Governor: Hugh Gregg; Lane Dwinell; Wesley Powell
- Preceded by: Gordon Tiffany
- Succeeded by: Gardner C. Turner

Personal details
- Born: Louis Crosby Wyman; March 16, 1917 Manchester, New Hampshire, U.S.
- Died: May 5, 2002 (aged 85) West Palm Beach, Florida, U.S.
- Party: Republican
- Spouse: Virginia E. Markley (m. 1938)
- Children: 2
- Education: University of New Hampshire (BS); Harvard University (LLB)

Military service
- Branch/service: United States Navy
- Years of service: 1942–1946
- Rank: Lieutenant

Louis Crosby Wyman (March 16, 1917 – May 5, 2002) was an American politician and lawyer. He was a United States representative and a U.S. senator from New Hampshire. He was a member of the Republican Party. Wyman's tenure in the Senate, at a mere three days long, ranks (as of 2026) as the shortest in American history.

== Early life and career ==
Louis Crosby Wyman was born on March 16, 1917, in Manchester, New Hampshire, the son of Alice Sibley (Crosby) and Louis Eliot Wyman. He graduated from the University of New Hampshire at Durham in 1938 and from Harvard Law School in 1941. He was admitted to the bars of Massachusetts and New Hampshire in 1941, and of Florida in 1957, and commenced the practice of law in Boston, Massachusetts, at Ropes and Gray.

During World War II, Wyman served in the Alaskan Theater as a lieutenant in the United States Naval Reserve from 1942 to 1946. He also served as general counsel to a U.S. Senate committee in 1946; secretary to Senator Styles Bridges in 1947; counsel to the Joint Congressional Committee on Foreign Economic Cooperation from 1948 to 1949; attorney general of New Hampshire from 1953 to 1961; president of the National Association of Attorneys General in 1957; and as legislative counsel to the governor of New Hampshire in 1961; member and chairman of several state legal and judicial commissions. His attempts to investigate alleged communists as attorney general lead to the Supreme Court case Sweezy v. New Hampshire, which ruled against the state and Wyman on due process grounds.

== House of Representatives ==
Wyman was elected as a Republican to the U.S. House from New Hampshire's 1st congressional district in 1962. He was swept out in the Democratic landslide of 1964, but regained his seat in 1966 and was reelected three more times.

Wyman was behind an amendment to 1964 automobile safety legislation which prohibited a "seat belt interlock system" in automobiles. The interlock system prevented automobiles from starting unless the driver was wearing a seatbelt. Consumer advocates had advocated for the safety measure, but the measure also provoked much opposition.

== Senate election ==
Wyman did not run for reelection to his House seat in 1974, opting instead to run for the Senate seat that was due to come open by 20-year incumbent Norris Cotton's retirement. The initial returns showed him defeating Democratic candidate John A. Durkin by 355 votes on election night.

Durkin demanded a recount, which resulted in Durkin winning by ten votes. Governor Meldrim Thomson then certified Durkin as the winner. However, Wyman demanded another recount in which he prevailed by two votes. Cotton resigned on December 31, 1974; Thomson appointed Wyman to the seat for the balance of the term ending January 3, 1975, to give him a leg up in seniority. This appeared to end the dispute, but Durkin appealed to the full Senate, which is the final arbiter of Senate elections per Article One of the U.S. Constitution.

The Senate Rules Committee, which has jurisdiction over the results of Senate elections, then deadlocked on whether to seat Wyman for the 1975–1981 term pending the resolution of the dispute. On January 14, the Senate returned the matter to the Rules Committee, which returned 35 disputed points to the full Senate based on 3,000 questionable ballots. However, the Senate was unable to break a deadlock on even one of the 35 points.

After seven months of wrangling which included six unsuccessful Democratic attempts to seat Durkin, Wyman, having never been seated, proposed that he and Durkin run again in a special election. Durkin agreed, and the Senate declared the seat officially vacant on August 8, 1975, pending the new election. Thomson appointed Cotton to his old seat in the meantime. The special election was held on September 16, and Durkin won handily, defeating Wyman by nearly 28,000 votes—ending what is still the closest Senate election since the people gained the right to directly elect Senators with the passage of the Seventeenth Amendment in 1913.

== Later life ==
Wyman served as an associate justice of the New Hampshire Superior Court from 1978 to 1987. He was a resident of Manchester, New Hampshire and West Palm Beach, Florida, until his death due to cancer on May 5, 2002. Wyman's remains were cremated, and the ashes scattered at sea.

== See also ==
- Unseated members of the United States Congress

Legal offices
Preceded by Gordon Tiffany	Attorney General of New Hampshire; 1953–1961	Succeeded by Gardner Turner
U.S. House of Representatives
Preceded by Chester Earl Merrow	Member of the U.S. House of Representatives from New Hampshire's 1st congressional district 1963–1965	Succeeded by Joseph Oliva Huot
Preceded by Joseph Oliva Huot	Member of the U.S. House of Representatives from New Hampshire's 1st congressional district 1967–1974	Succeeded by Norman D'Amours
Party political offices
Preceded by Norris Cotton	Republican nominee for U.S. Senator from New Hampshire (Class 3); 1974, 1975	Succeeded by Warren Rudman
U.S. Senate
Preceded by Norris Cotton	U.S. Senator (Class 3) from New Hampshire; 1974–1975; Served alongside: Thomas McIntyre	Succeeded by Norris Cotton
