= New Hampshire State Treasurer =

Constitutional officer of the U.S. state of New Hampshire

State Treasurer of New Hampshire
- Seal of New Hampshire
- Incumbent; Monica Mezzapelle since March 26, 2020
- New Hampshire State Treasury
- Type: Constitutional officer
- Status: Active
- Reports to: New Hampshire General Court; Governor of New Hampshire
- Seat: State House Annex, Concord, New Hampshire
- Appointer: New Hampshire General Court (joint ballot)
- Term length: 2 years; No term limits
- Constituting instrument: Constitution of New Hampshire (Part II, Art. 67)
- Precursor: Treasurer of the Province of New Hampshire
- Inaugural holder: Richard Martin (colonial); Nicholas Gilman (state)
- Formation: 1680 (Province); 1776 (State)
- Succession: Fourth (Gubernatorial)
- Deputy: Deputy State Treasurer
- Website: www.treasury.nh.gov

The State Treasurer of New Hampshire is a constitutional officer of the U.S. state of New Hampshire responsible for managing the state's cash receipts, disbursements, investments, debt issuance, and unclaimed property programs. The office is established under Part II, Article 67 of the Constitution of New Hampshire.

Unlike most U.S. states where the treasurer is chosen by popular vote, the New Hampshire State Treasurer is elected every two years by a joint ballot of the New Hampshire General Court (the Senate and the House of Representatives). When a vacancy occurs between legislative sessions, the Governor, with the advice and consent of the Executive Council, appoints a Commissioner of the Treasury to lead the department until the General Court convenes to elect a successor.

The incumbent State Treasurer is Monica Mezzapelle, who has served in the role since December 2, 2020.

== List of treasurers ==
=== Colonial and provincial treasurers (1680–1776) ===
During the colonial period, the treasurer was appointed by the chief executive of the Province of New Hampshire and frequently served concurrently as Secretary of the Province.

Name	Residence	Term
Richard Martin	Portsmouth	1680–1684
Samuel Penhallow	Portsmouth	1684–1692; 1699–1726
William Partridge	Portsmouth	1692–1695
George Jaffrey	Portsmouth	1695–1696
Joseph Smith	Hampton	1696; 1698–1699
William Vaughan	Portsmouth	1696–1698
George Jaffrey Jr.	Portsmouth	1726–1730; 1742–1749
Henry Sherburne	Portsmouth	1730–1742
George Jaffrey III	Portsmouth	1749–1776

=== State treasurers (1776–present) ===
Following the adoption of New Hampshire's revolutionary constitution in 1776, the office became elected by the state legislature. Individuals appointed temporarily between legislative elections held the title of Commissioner of the Treasury.

Name	Residence	Term	Notes
Nicholas Gilman	Exeter	1776–1783	
John T. Gilman	Exeter	1783–1789; 1791–1794	
William Gardner	Portsmouth	1789–1791	
Oliver Peabody	Exeter	1794–1804	
Nathaniel Gilman	Exeter	1804–1809; 1810–1814	
Thomas W. Thompson	Salisbury	1809–1810	
William Kent	Concord	1814–1816	
William Pickering	Concord	1816–1828; 1829–1830	
Samuel Morrill	Concord	1828–1829	
Abner B. Kelly	Warner	1830–1837	
Zenas Clement	Concord	1837–1843	
John Atwood	Concord	1843–1846; 1847–1850	
James Peverly Jr.	Concord	1846–1847	
Edson Hill	Concord	1850–1853	
Walter Harriman	Warner	1853–1855	
William Berry	Barnstead	1855–1857	
Peter Sanborn	Concord	1857–1871	
Leander W. Cogswell	—	1871–1872	
Solon A. Carter	Concord	1872–1874; 1875–1913	
Josiah G. Dearborn	Weare	1874–1875	
George E. Farrand	Concord	1913–1914; 1923–1925	
J. Wesley Plummer	Concord	1914–1923	
Henry E. Chamberlin	Concord	1925–1929	Died in office
Charles T. Patten	Nashua	1929–1936	Served as Commissioner (1929–1931) before election; resigned
F. Gordon Kimball	Concord	1936–1950	Served as Commissioner (1936–1937) before election
Remick Laighton	Portsmouth	1950–1951	Commissioner of the Treasury
Winfield J. Phillips	Concord	1951–1952	
Alfred S. Cloues	Warner	1953–1964	Served as Commissioner in 1953 before election; died in office
Robert W. Flanders	Concord	1964–1984	Served as Commissioner (1964–1965) before election; resigned
Martha M. Custer	Concord	1984	Commissioner of the Treasury
Georgie A. Thomas	Thornton	1984–2002	Resigned
Michael A. Ablowich	Portsmouth	2002–2006	Served as Commissioner (2002–2003) before election
Catherine A. Provencher	Merrimack	2007–2014	Resigned
William F. Dwyer	Gilford	2014–2020	Served as Commissioner (2014–2015) before election; resigned
Monica Mezzapelle	Concord	2020–present	Served as Commissioner (March–December 2020) before election

== See also ==
- Government of New Hampshire
- New Hampshire Secretary of State
