= New Hampshire Attorney General =

Attorney General of New Hampshire
- Incumbent; John Formella since April 22, 2021
- New Hampshire Department of Justice
- Type: Attorney general
- Appointer: Governor of New Hampshire; with approval of the Governor's Council
- Term length: 4 years
- Constituting instrument: Part II, Article 46 of the Constitution of New Hampshire
- Formation: 1892
- First holder: Edwin G. Eastman
- Salary: $141,390 (2022)
- Website: doj.nh.gov

The attorney general of New Hampshire is a constitutional officer of the U.S. state of New Hampshire who serves as head of the New Hampshire Department of Justice. As of April 22, 2021, the state's attorney general is John Formella.

== Qualifications and appointment ==
Under Part II, Article 46 of the New Hampshire Constitution, the attorney general is appointed by the governor with approval of the Council. The attorney general serves a term of four years, as required by RSA 21-M:3, which is two years longer than the term of the governor. The attorney general and their deputy must be "admitted to the practice of law in New Hampshire" and also "be qualified by reason of education and experience."

== Powers and duties ==
New Hampshire Revised Statutes Annotated (RSA) Section 7:6 lists the attorney general's "Powers and Duties as State's Attorney":

- Shall act as attorney for the state in all criminal and civil cases in the supreme court in which the state is interested, and in the prosecution of persons accused of crimes punishable with death (which no longer exist in New Hampshire) or imprisonment for life.
- Shall have and exercise general supervision of the criminal cases pending before the state supreme and superior courts, and
- With the aid of the county attorneys, the attorney general shall enforce the criminal laws of the state
- Shall have the power to collect uncollected debts owed to the state as set forth in RSA 7:15-a.

The attorney general can choose when to relieve any officer or person of any duty prescribed by law relative to the enforcement of any criminal law.

=== County attorneys ===
Part II, Article 71, of the state constitution, provides for county attorneys (previously county solicitors) to be elected by the inhabitants of the respective counties according to the state election laws. However RSA 7:34 states, "the county attorney of each county shall be under the direction of the Attorney General, and, in the absence of the latter, he or she shall perform all the duties of the Attorney General's office for the county." In Wyman v. Danais, 101 N.H. 487, (1958), the New Hampshire Supreme Court held:

Construed together [RSA 7:6, 7:11 and 7:34] demonstrate a legislative purpose to place ultimate responsibility for criminal law enforcement in the Attorney General, and to give him the power to control, direct and supervise criminal law enforcement by the county attorneys in cases where he deems it in the public interest.

== Office of the Attorney General ==
The attorney general is required by statute to nominate a deputy and a Director of Administration. They also may nominate assistant and senior assistant attorneys general, as well as criminal justice and consumer protection investigators; provided there is money appropriated in biennium budget for such positions. Additionally, in the interest of the public welfare, the attorney general is permitted to delegate the authority of the office to the deputy and assistant attorneys general as they see fit.

=== Deputy attorney general ===
The attorney general is required to nominate a deputy attorney general for appointment by the governor, with the consent of the council. The deputy acts as attorney general whenever the latter is absent or unable to act from any cause, or whenever there is a vacancy in the office, provided an acting attorney general has not been appointed.

==== Acting attorney general ====
The governor and Council are required by RSA 7:15 to appoint an acting attorney general if the attorney general becomes incapacitated to perform his or her duties. The acting attorney general serves only during such incapacity and is paid a "reasonable compensation for his [or her] services and expenses." The deputy attorney general serves as the acting attorney general until the governor and Council appoint someone to be the acting attorney general.

=== Assistant attorneys general ===
The attorney general is permitted to appoint assistant attorneys general subject to the approval of the governor and council, as provided for in the budget. Assistant attorneys general each serve a term of 5 years and should a position be vacant prior to the expiration of the term, such a vacancy can be filled for the remainder of the term. An assistant attorney general may be removed only as provided by RSA 4:1.

=== Senior assistant attorneys general ===
The attorney general can also designate senior assistant attorneys general, who serve at the pleasure of the attorney general. Senior assistant attorneys general may serve as bureau chiefs, or in any other position as the attorney general sees fit.

=== Director of administration ===
The attorney general is also required to nominate, subject to confirmation by the governor and council, an unclassified director of administration for the Office of Attorney General, within the limits of the appropriation made for the appointment, who shall serve for a 5-year term. The director of administration may be removed only as provided by RSA 4:1.

=== Investigators ===
The attorney general may nominate criminal justice investigators and consumer protection investigators, subject to confirmation by the governor and Council. Criminal justice investigators and consumer protection investigators serve a term of five years. The investigators are given statewide law enforcement authority and are considered a "peace officer" as defined in RSA 594:1, III, which authorizes them to make arrests in a criminal case. Investigators are required to meet the certification requirements for a police officer pursuant to RSA 188-F:26. Unless investigators fail to achieve certification or are decertified by the New Hampshire Police Standards and Training Council, investigators are only subject to removal as provided by RSA 4:1.

== List of attorneys general ==
No.	Officeholder		Term of office		Party
No.	Name	Image	From	To	Party
1	Edwin G. Eastman		1892	1912	Republican
2	James P. Tuttle		1912	1918	Republican
3	Oscar L. Young		1918	1923	
4	Jeremy R. Waldron		1925	1929	
5	Ralph W. Davis		1929	1932	
6	Francis W. Johnston		1932	1935	
7	Thomas P. Cheney		1935	1940	
8	Frank R. Kenison		1940	1942	
9	Stephen Morse Wheeler		1942	1944	
10	Harold K. Davison		1944	1945	
11	Ernest R. D'Amours		1946	1949	
12	William L. Phinney		1949	1950	
13	Gordon M. Tiffany		1950	1953	
14	Louis C. Wyman		1953	1961	Republican
15	Gardner C. Turner		1961	1961	Republican
16	William Maynard				
17	Maurice J. Murphy		November 4, 1961	December 7, 1961	Republican
18	George S. Pappagianis				
19	Warren Rudman		December 3, 1970	July 17, 1976	Republican
20	David Souter		July 17, 1976	September 19, 1978	Republican
21	Thomas D. Rath		September 19, 1978	November 8, 1980	Republican
22	Gregory H. Smith				
23	Steve Merrill		1984	1989	Republican
24	John P. Arnold		January 21, 1989	December 27, 1992	
25	Jeffrey R. Howard		February 25, 1993	August 21, 1997	
26	Philip T. McLaughlin		August 21, 1997	October 18, 2003	
27	Peter Heed		October 18, 2003	July 15, 2004	Republican
28	Kelly Ayotte		July 15, 2004	July 17, 2009	Republican
29	Michael Delaney		August 24, 2009	May 15, 2013	Democratic
30	Joseph Foster		May 15, 2013	March 31, 2017	Democratic
31	Gordon J. MacDonald		April 13, 2017	March 4, 2021; On leave from January 8, 2021	Republican
–	Jane Young; Acting		January 8, 2021	April 21, 2021	Republican
32	John Formella		April 21, 2021		Republican
