= David Huot =

American politician

Member of the New Hampshire House of Representatives
- In office December 7, 2022 – December 4, 2024
- Constituency: 5th Belknap district
- In office December 7, 2016 – December 2, 2020
- Constituency: 3rd Belknap district
- In office December 5, 2012 – December 3, 2014
- Constituency: 3rd Belknap district
- In office December 6, 1972 – December 4, 1974
- Constituency: 6th Belknap district
- In office December 2, 1970 – December 6, 1972
- Constituency: 9th Belknap district

Personal details
- Born: David Oliva Huot; April 4, 1942 (age 84) Laconia, New Hampshire
- Party: Democratic
- Spouses: Patricia Ann Hawkins (m. 1981; died 2002); June Walsh
- Parent: J. Oliva Huot (father)
- Education: Saint Anselm College (AB); Georgetown University (JD)

Military service
- Allegiance: United States
- Branch/service: United States Air Force
- Years of service: 1967–1998
- Rank: Lieutenant colonel
- Unit: N.H. Air National Guard

David Oliva Huot (born April 4, 1942) is a New Hampshire politician who formerly served in the New Hampshire House of Representatives.

His father, J. Oliva Huot was a United States congressman. He graduated from the Georgetown law school in 1967, and later worked as a lawyer in Laconia until in 1979, when he was nominated a judge for the Laconia district court by the Governor.
