= Monica Mezzapelle =

New Hampshire State Treasurer (born 1970s)

State Treasurer of New Hampshire
- Incumbent
- Assumed office December 2, 2020 (Acting from March 25, 2020)
- Governor: Chris Sununu; Kelly Ayotte
- Preceded by: William Dwyer

Personal details
- Party: Nonpartisan
- Education: La Salle University (BS)
- Profession: Accountant, public official
- Website: Official website

Monica I. Mezzapelle is an American accountant and government official who has served as the State Treasurer of New Hampshire since December 2020. Prior to becoming treasurer, she served as Deputy State Treasurer from 2014 to 2020.

== Early life and education ==
Mezzapelle earned a Bachelor of Science degree in accounting and finance from La Salle University in Mexico. She is a member of the American Institute of Certified Public Accountants and the New Hampshire Government Finance Officers Association.

== Career ==
Mezzapelle began working for the State of New Hampshire in 2000 as a financial and compliance auditor in the Office of the Legislative Budget Assistant. In May 2014, she joined the New Hampshire State Treasury as Deputy State Treasurer, where she oversaw the administration of treasury operations.

=== State Treasurer of New Hampshire ===
On February 25, 2020, following the resignation announcement of State Treasurer William Dwyer, Governor Chris Sununu nominated Mezzapelle to serve as Commissioner of the Treasury. She was appointed by the Executive Council of New Hampshire on March 25, 2020.

On December 2, 2020, the New Hampshire General Court elected Mezzapelle to a full two-year term as State Treasurer. She was subsequently re-elected unopposed by the legislature to additional two-year terms in December 2022 and December 2024.

As State Treasurer, Mezzapelle also serves as an ex officio trustee on the board of the New Hampshire Retirement System and the New Hampshire Municipal Bond Bank.

Political offices
Preceded by William Dwyer	State Treasurer of New Hampshire; 2020–present	Incumbent
