= John Formella =

American politician (born 1986 or 1987)

31st Attorney General of New Hampshire
- Incumbent
- Assumed office April 22, 2021
- Governor: Chris Sununu; Kelly Ayotte
- Preceded by: Jane Young (acting)

Personal details
- Born: John Michael Formella; 1986 or 1987 (age 39–40) Rochester, Minnesota, U.S.
- Party: Republican
- Education: Florida State University (BA, MS); George Washington University (JD)
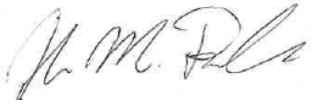
- Signature

John Michael Formella (born 1986 or 1987) is an American lawyer serving as the 31st Attorney General of New Hampshire since 2021. He previously served as legal counsel for Governor Chris Sununu.

== Early life and education ==
Formella was born in Rochester, Minnesota, to John and Nancy Formella. He has been a resident of New Hampshire since 1999, when his family relocated to New Hampshire from Florida. He attended Florida State University from 2004 to 2009, where he was a member of Phi Beta Kappa and graduated Magna Cum Laude with a B.A. in English Literature and later an M.S. in Applied American Politics and Policy. Formella later attended George Washington University Law School, where he graduated with honors and was a member of the George Washington University International Law Review.

== Career ==
In 2009, Formella served as a legislative intern for Florida State Representative Steve Crisafulli. In 2010, he served as a judicial intern to United States district judge Virginia M. Hernandez Covington of the Middle District of Florida.

After graduating from law school in 2012, Formella began his career in private practice at Pierce Atwood LLP --- one of the largest law firms in Northern New England at the time. At Pierce Atwood, Formella practiced actively in New Hampshire, Massachusetts and Maine and was a member of the Firm's Business and Environmental Law practice groups. He left the firm in January 2017 to accept an appointment as Legal Counsel to incoming New Hampshire Governor Chris Sununu.

Formella served as Governor Chris Sununu's legal counsel from Sununu's first day in office on January 5, 2017, through April 16, 2021. In that role, he advised the Governor and coordinated with the New Hampshire Department of Justice and Executive Branch officials on all significant legal issues and litigation affecting the State. In addition, he worked with the Sununu administration to address numerous and significant challenges, including the negotiation of a revised seven year MET/DSH settlement agreement that brought stability to New Hampshire's healthcare system, the establishment of a new Doorway Program that greatly enhanced the State's response to the Opioid Crisis, criminal justice reform initiatives that secured the support of law enforcement and community stakeholders, and the multi-faceted efforts that the State of New Hampshire undertook to combat the Covid-19 pandemic.

=== New Hampshire Attorney General (2021-present) ===
On March 3, 2021, Governor Chris Sununu nominated Formella to succeed Gordon J. MacDonald as New Hampshire Attorney General. Formella was confirmed by the Executive Council of New Hampshire in a 4-1 party line vote on March 24, 2021, and sworn into office on April 22, 2021.

As Attorney General, Formella serves as the New Hampshire's Chief Law Enforcement Officer, Chief Prosecutor, and Chief Legal Officer.

Formella has continued the efforts of past New Hampshire Attorneys General to pursue companies responsible for fueling the opioid epidemic. On September 28, 2021, Formella announced that New Hampshire would join a $21 billion settlement with opioid distributors McKesson Corporation, Cardinal Health and Amerisource Bergen. Under the settlement, New Hampshire will receive approximately $115 million over 18 years.

Formella joined in various efforts to oppose actions by President Joe Biden's administration. New Hampshire was part of a coalition of 13 states that sued the Biden administration over a provision in the American Rescue Plan Act that bars states from using relief money to offset tax cuts. Formella also partnered with 19 other attorneys general to submit comments opposing proposed rules from The Bureau of Alcohol, Tobacco, Firearms and Explosives (ATF) that would increase regulation of firearms kits.

As part of an investigation into the impact of social media on young people in 2023, Formella asked families to share stories of teenagers and children who were harmed by social media.

==== Actions against NSC-131 ====
On January 17, 2023, John Formella along with Portsmouth Police Chief Mark Newport announced an enforcement action against the neo-Nazi Nationalist Social Club (NSC-131), Christopher Hood and Leo Anthony Cullinan for violating New Hampshire's Civil Rights Act and conspiring to violate New Hampshire's Civil Rights Act. The civil complaint read as that Hood, Cullinan and NSC-131 members trespassed onto an overpass and hung a banner reading "Keep New England White", and that these actions were motivated by race. These charges were eventually dismissed by Rockingham County Superior Court Judge David Ruoff.

On December 12, 2023, John Formella announced an enforcement action by the New Hampshire Department of Justice's Civil Rights Unit against Nationalist Social Club-131 ("NSC-131"), Christopher Hood, and nineteen John Does for violating the New Hampshire Law Against Discrimination, RSA Chapter 354-A. The civil complaint alleges that Hood led a group of 19 John Does tried to intimidate the Teatotaller Cáfe into stopping their drag story hour. The case is still ongoing.

Legal offices
Preceded by Jane Young; Acting	Attorney General of New Hampshire; 2021–present	Incumbent
