= William L. Phinney =

American politician

12th Attorney General of New Hampshire
- In office 1949–1950
- Governor: Sherman Adams
- Preceded by: Ernest R. D'Amours
- Succeeded by: Gordon M. Tiffany

Personal details
- Born: William L. Phinney; 1909
- Died: August 6, 1977 (aged 67–68) Manchester, New Hampshire
- Education: Dartmouth College (BA); Harvard Law School (LLB)

William L. Phinney (1909 - August 6, 1977) was an American politician who served as the Attorney General of New Hampshire from 1949 to 1950.
