= Facial and as-applied challenges =

Challenge in U.S. constitutional law

In U.S. constitutional law, a facial challenge is a challenge to a statute in which the plaintiff alleges that the legislation is always unconstitutional, and therefore void. It is contrasted with an as-applied challenge, which alleges that a particular application of a statute is unconstitutional.

If a facial challenge is successful, a court will declare the statute in question facially invalid, which has the effect of striking it down entirely. This contrasts with a successful as-applied challenge, which will result in a court narrowing the circumstances in which the statute may constitutionally be applied without striking it down. In some cases—e.g., Gonzales v. Carhart or Crawford v. Marion County Election Board, a facial challenge has been rejected with either the court or concurring Justices intimating that the upheld statute might be vulnerable to an as-applied challenge.

In First Amendment cases, another type of facial challenge is enunciated in the overbreadth doctrine. If a statute reaches to include substantially protected conduct and speech in relation to the legitimate reach of the statute, then it is overbroad and thus void on its face.

== Facial versus as-applied challenges ==
As discussed above, one primary distinction between the two methods of challenging legislation in court is that a facial challenge to a statute seeks to invalidate it in its entirety because every application is unconstitutional, whereas an as-applied challenge seeks to invalidate a particular application of a statute. A second distinction between the two is that a facial challenge may be brought soon after a statute's passage in a legislature; however, an as-applied challenge, as the name suggests, can only be brought once it has been enforced. In this sense, a facial challenge is prospective, or forward looking, because it seeks to prevent a law from being enforced and thus violating someone's constitutional rights, and an as-applied challenge is retrospective, or backward looking, because it seeks to redress a constitutional violation that has already occurred. Since facial challenges have the potential to invalidate a statute in its entirety, they are said to be disfavored. Legal scholar Richard H. Fallon Jr. has argued that both terms are ambiguous and not as easily distinguishable from one another. Indeed, the U.S. Supreme Court has acknowledged this fact. In Citizens United v. Federal Election Commission, it stated, "the distinction between facial and as-applied challenges is not so well defined that it has some automatic effect or that it must always control the pleadings and disposition in every case involving a constitutional challenge".

Because a successful facial challenge carries with it greater consequences than an as-applied challenge, i.e., the entire legislation is invalidated, the U.S. Supreme Court has declared facial challenges disfavored, which should, therefore, be used rarely. In Washington State Grange v. Washington State Republican Party, the U.S. Supreme Court stated several reasons for disfavoring facial challenges.

Claims of facial invalidity often rest on speculation. As a consequence, they raise the risk of "premature interpretation of statutes on the basis of factually barebones records". Sabri v. United States, 541 U.S. 600, 609 (2004) (internal quotation marks and brackets omitted). Facial challenges also run contrary to the fundamental principle of judicial restraint that courts should neither "anticipate a question of constitutional law in advance of the necessity of deciding it" nor "formulate a rule of constitutional law broader than is required by the precise facts to which it is to be applied." Ashwander v. Tennessee Valley Authority, 297 U.S. 288, 347 (1936) (Brandeis, J., concurring). Finally, facial challenges threaten to short circuit the democratic process by preventing laws embodying the will of the people from being implemented in a manner consistent with the Constitution. We must keep in mind that "[a] ruling of unconstitutionality frustrates the intent of the elected representatives of the people." Ayotte v. Planned Parenthood of Northern New Eng., 546 U.S. 320, 329 (2006).

Due to the speculative, possibly premature, and anti-democratic nature of judicial review of a facial challenge, the Supreme Court has placed a higher burden on those wishing to establish a facial challenge. In U.S. v. Stevens, it stated, "To succeed in a typical facial attack, [the respondent] would have to establish “that no set of circumstances exists under which [the statute] would be valid”, United States v. Salerno, 481 U.S. 739, 745 (1987), or that the statute lacks any “plainly legitimate sweep", Washington v. Glucksberg, 521 U.S. 702, 740, n. 7 (1997) (Stevens, J., concurring in judgments) (internal quotation marks omitted).

== Contrary position ==
Despite the claims of Supreme Court Justices that facial challenges should be rare, empirical studies have been carried out that seem to prove otherwise. In 2011, Richard Fallon wrote an article claiming that the Supreme Court does effectively resort to facial challenges to decide upon the validity of statutes more regularly than it claims. For instance, the court applied facial challenges to invalidate challenged statutes in Brown v. Board of Education under the Equal Protection Clause, Brandenburg v. Ohio under the First Amendment, and United States v. Lopez under the Commerce Clause. Also, the article asserts that contrary to popular belief, facial challenges are not framed by only a few aberrant constitutional tests. As claimed by the article, facial challenges are constituted by important constitutional tests such as the "rational basis test", which may sometimes indicate that a statute is invalid on its face because it does not posit any rational relation to a legitimate state interest.

In 2011 there was a facial challenge to the insurance mandate portion of the Patient Protection and Affordable Care Act.
