= Cynthia Hogan =

American attorney and political advisor (born 1958)

Counsel to the Vice President
- In office January 20, 2009 – January 20, 2013
- Vice President: Joe Biden
- Preceded by: Kathryn L. Wheelbarger
- Succeeded by: John McGrail

Personal details
- Born: Cynthia C. Hogan; 1958 (age 67–68) Cincinnati, Ohio, U.S.
- Party: Democratic
- Spouse: Mark Katz
- Children: 2
- Education: Oberlin College (BA); University of Virginia (JD)

Cynthia C. Hogan (born 1958) is an American attorney and political advisor who served as counsel to the Vice President of the United States, Joe Biden, from 2009 to 2013. In 2020, Hogan joined the Joe Biden 2020 presidential campaign as a member of the vice-presidential vetting committee.

== Early life and education ==
Hogan was born in Cincinnati, Ohio in 1958. She earned a Bachelor of Arts degree in art history from Oberlin College and a Juris Doctor from the University of Virginia Law School. In law school, she was the notes editor of the Virginia Law Review. She served as a clerk for U.S. District Court judge Edward N. Cahn in the Eastern District of Pennsylvania.

== Career ==
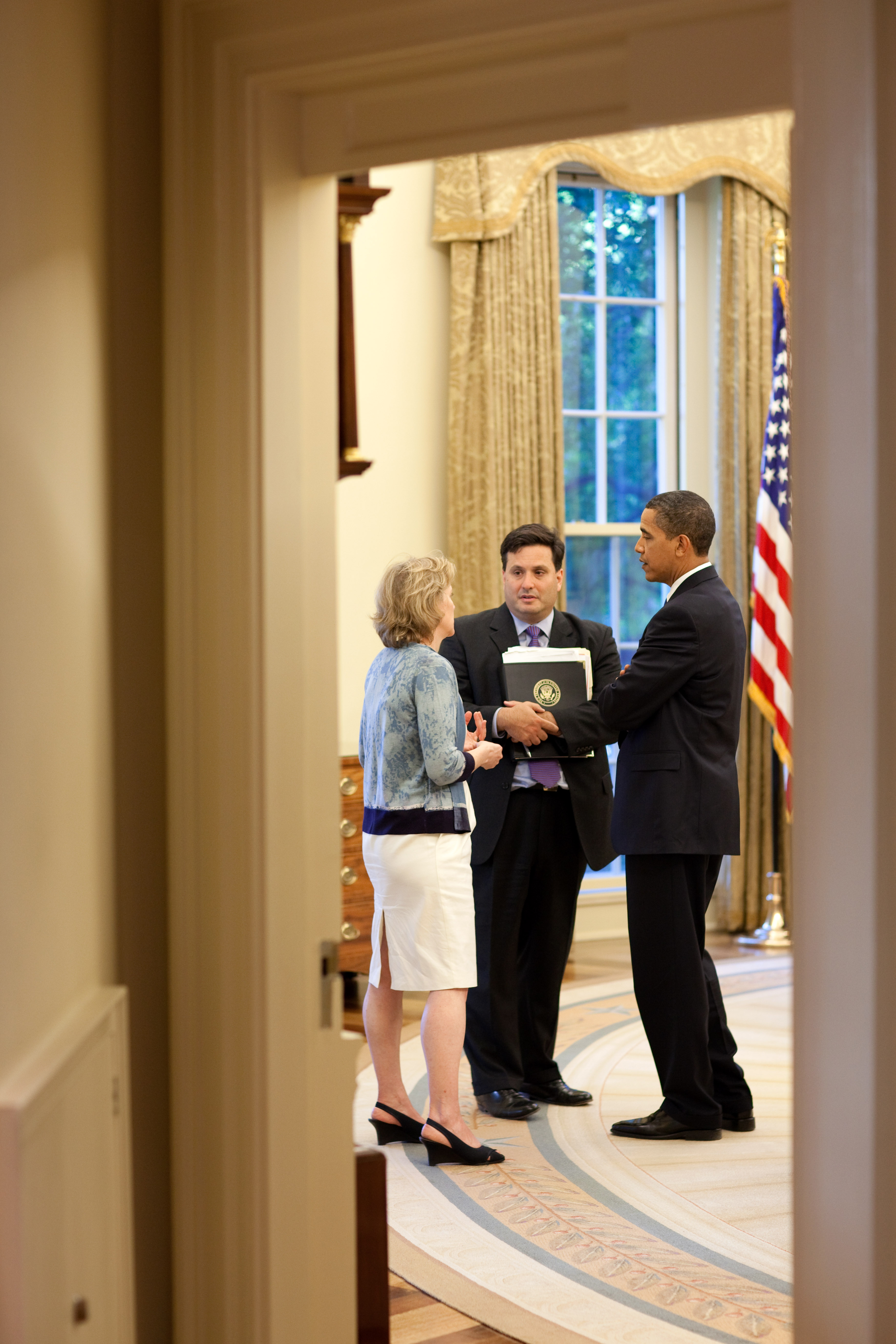
Hogan (left) meeting President Barack Obama and Biden's Chief of Staff Ron Klain in the Oval Office in 2009

In 1995, she assisted with the drafting of the Comprehensive Terrorism Prevention Act of 1995, along with six other members of the Democratic party.

Hogan began her legal career as an associate at Williams & Connolly. She later worked as Chief Counsel to Biden during his time in the United States Senate and through the duration of his tenure as Vice President. She also served as Staff Director of the Senate Judiciary Committee. In 2009, she served as the sherpa for Sonia Sotomayor's nomination to the Supreme Court.

After leaving the Obama Administration in 2013, Hogan served as Senior Vice President of Public Policy and Government Affairs for the National Football League and Vice President for Public Policy and Government Affairs at Apple.

On April 30, 2020, Hogan joined the Joe Biden 2020 presidential campaign as a member of the vice presidential vetting committee.
