= Sherpa (political consultant) =

American political consultant

A sherpa is an experienced Washington D.C. political consultant brought on to guide an administration's nominee to Senate approval.

== History of the usage ==
Sherpa is a word taken from the language of the Sherpa, a nomadic people of the Himalayas. It literally means 'people of the East'. The English word sherpa originally referred to people hired as porters and guides by climbers of the Himalayan Mountains. Sherpas have a long history of helping to navigate difficult mountain terrain. Senate confirmation has been compared to mountain climbing: dangerous and exhausting. Like the Himalayan climbers, nominees need guides "through the obstacle course of interviews and hearings".

== Role ==
Supreme Court and top Cabinet post nominations have become increasingly partisan and contentious. Nominees for these positions now have designated sherpas who have extensive political experience and are reliable. Sub-cabinet nominees are generally handled by department level political staff. The role of chief strategist and stage manager, to get someone confirmed, is unpaid, largely out of public view and without official title. The role has many facets:

- Media messenger – shaping the candidate's image, devising strategies to deal with reporters and coordinating calls with key senators
- Traffic cop – everybody wants a bit of time with the nominee
- Liaison with both the Senate and the administration; act as escort for nominee to meet senators and be an adviser for the president
- Coach – what to say and when to say it and how to have proper demeanor: low profile, suitably humble, deferential, polite and persuasive in answering questions
- Confidant and sounding board
- Counselor and hand holder

== Notable examples ==
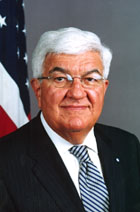
Tom C. Korologos, who guided some 80 Nixon and two dozen Reagan nominations

- Kelly Ayotte (former senator) for Justice Neil Gorsuch
- Jon Kyl (former senator) for Justice Brett Kavanaugh
- Kenneth Duberstein (former White House Chief of Staff) for Justices David Souter and Clarence Thomas
- Fred D. Thompson (former senator) and Ed Gillespie (former Republican National Committee chair) for Chief Justice John Roberts
- Michael S. Berman for Justices Stephen Breyer and Ruth Bader Ginsburg
- Doug Jones (former senator) for Justice Ketanji Brown Jackson
- Cynthia Hogan (political advisor) for Justice Sonia Sotomayor
- Tom C. Korologos for Vice President Nelson Rockefeller, Chief Justice William Rehnquist, and Justice Antonin Scalia

== See also ==
- Sherpa (emissary)
