= J. Oliva Huot =

American politician (1917–1983)

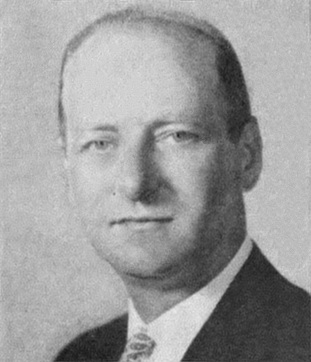

Member of the U.S. House of Representatives from New Hampshire's 1st district
- In office January 3, 1965 – January 3, 1967
- Preceded by: Louis C. Wyman
- Succeeded by: Louis C. Wyman

Personal details
- Born: Joseph Oliva Huot; August 11, 1917 Laconia, New Hampshire
- Died: August 5, 1983 (aged 65) Laconia, New Hampshire
- Party: Democratic
- Spouse: Irene Fournier (m. 1938)
- Children: David

Joseph Oliva Huot (August 11, 1917 – August 5, 1983) was a U.S. representative from New Hampshire.

Born in Laconia, Huot was educated at Sacred Heart Parochial School and Laconia High School. From 1935 until 1956, he was a supervisor in the tabulating department of a manufacturer of knitting machines. He was a newspaper advertising manager from 1956 until 1964 and general manager of a weekly newspaper from 1959 until 1964.

Huot was a member of the Laconia Board of Education, 1953–1959, and served as mayor of Laconia, 1959–1963. He was a Democratic candidate for Congress in 1962, and he served as a delegate to the Democratic National Convention in 1964.

Huot was elected as a Democrat to the Eighty-ninth Congress (January 3, 1965 – January 3, 1967). He was an unsuccessful candidate for reelection in 1966 to the Ninetieth Congress. He was a resident of Laconia, until his death there on August 5, 1983. He was interred in Sacred Heart Cemetery in Laconia. The Technical Center of Laconia High School is now named after him.

U.S. House of Representatives
Preceded by Louis C. Wyman	U.S. Representative for the 1st district of New Hampshire; January 3, 1965 – January 3, 1967	Succeeded by Louis C. Wyman
