= Gardner C. Turner =

American attorney and politician

Member of the New Hampshire House of Representatives
- In office 1947–1951

Attorney General of New Hampshire
- In office 1961
- Governor: Wesley Powell
- Preceded by: Louis C. Wyman
- Succeeded by: William Maynard

Personal details
- Born: March 3, 1910 Ludlow, Massachusetts, U.S.
- Died: January 23, 1970 (aged 59)
- Party: Republican

Gardner C. Turner (March 3, 1910 – January 23, 1970) was an American attorney and politician. A member of the Republican Party, he served in the New Hampshire House of Representatives from 1947 to 1951 and as attorney general of New Hampshire in 1961.
