= Ernest R. D'Amours =

American politician

11th Attorney General of New Hampshire
- In office 1946–1949
- Governor: Charles M. Dale
- Preceded by: Harold K. Davison
- Succeeded by: William L. Phinney

Personal details
- Born: Ernest R. D'Amours; April 24, 1904 Holyoke, Massachusetts
- Died: May 4, 1965 (aged 61)
- Party: Republican
- Education: Assumption University (BA); Harvard Law School (LLB)

Ernest R. D'Amours (April 24, 1904 - May 4, 1965 was an American politician who served as the Attorney General of New Hampshire from 1946 to 1949.
