= New Hampshire Revised Statutes Annotated =

The New Hampshire Revised Statutes Annotated (RSA) forms the codified law of the state New Hampshire subordinate to the New Hampshire State Constitution.

== History ==
The RSA is a set of law books published by Thomson West. The work of updating the previous codification, the Revised Laws (RL) of 1942, was authorized by law in 1953 and was "not intended to change the meaning of the law as it existed on December 31, 1954." The work was performed by a New Hampshire Revision Commission, which describes its actions at the start of each volume of the RSA, and was ratified in 1955 by statute.

A predecessor of Thomson West acquired the business of publishing the RSA from Equity Publishing Corp., founded by former governor Meldrim Thomson Jr.

== Contents ==
The RSA endeavors to collect all the current laws "of a public and general nature" in a single, numbered set. The United States Constitution and of the New Hampshire Constitution are included in the RSA.

The RSA is structured as follows:

- Titles addressing a general topic
- Chapters
- Sections, which may be one or more paragraphs

Each section of the RSA includes annotations, such as a summary of court cases that were decided based on that section, a list of other cases that cited the section, cross-references to other parts of the RSA and references to relevant legal publications.

The printed books are reissued occasionally. After each legislative session, pamphlets with cumulative changes to a given volume are issued, to be inserted in a pocket at the rear of the volume. A reissued volume incorporates all such changes.

Disposition tables appear in the printed set and in each set of pamphlets to help the reader determine the disposition of the previous codification and of each enactment of the New Hampshire legislature, and where that text was placed in the RSA. In cases in which source text was omitted from the RSA (for example, a law that is now obsolete or superseded by another), the disposition tables provide the rationale.

Text of the law is the property of the state of New Hampshire, and can be read and searched without the annotations on the state web site. The annotations are added by Thomson West.

The numbering of laws becomes obsolete through subsequent work of the legislature. New chapters of law may be inserted; for example, a new chapter to be located between Chapter 1 and Chapter 2 is called Chapter 1-A. Repealed chapters are shown without their former text but with a note that they were repealed. Their chapter numbers will not be reused until the next complete recodification.

In some cases, an entire title has been recodified. The chapters of the old title are repealed and new chapters are added at the end as a new title. Single chapters are often recodified and given a number with a suffix such as "-A", and they replace the entire old chapter. Either recodification technique makes it easier to see the current law in one place without requiring recodification of parts of the RSA that are changed less frequently.

== Titles in the RSA ==
Important titles in the RSA include:

- Title I: The State and Its Government (Chapters 1 - 21)
- Title III: Towns, Cities, Villages and Municipal Places (Chapters 31 - 53-E)
- Title V: Taxation (Chapters 71 - 90)
- Title XVIII: Fish and Game (Chapters 206 - 215-C)
- Title XX: Transportation (Chapters 228 - 240)
- Title XXI: Motor Vehicles (Chapters 259 - 269)
- Title XXIII: Labor (Chapters 273 - 283)
- Title XXX: Occupations and Professions (Chapters 309 - 322-I)
- Title XXXIV-A: Uniform Commercial Code (Chapter 382-A)
- Title XLIII: Domestic Relations (Chapters 457 - 461-B)
- Title XLV: Animals (Chapters 466 - 470)
- Title LXII: Criminal Code (Chapters 625 - 651-F)
- Title LXIII: Elections (Chapters 652 - 671)
