= George S. Pappagianis =

American politician

18th Attorney General of New Hampshire
- In office 1967–1970
- Governor: John W. King
- Preceded by: William Maynard
- Succeeded by: Warren B. Rudman

Minority leader of the New Hampshire House of Representatives
- In office 1960s–1960s

Personal details
- Party: Democratic
- Education: Harvard College (BA); Boston University Law School (LLB)

George S. Pappagianis was an American attorney and politician in New Hampshire. A Democrat, Pappagianis served as the Attorney General of New Hampshire from 1967 to 1979 under Governor John W. King. He previously served in the New Hampshire House of Representatives, where he served as minority leader in the 1960s. As Attorney General, he held unconstitutional the state's unconstitutional loyalty oath for public officials, state employes, and candidates for political office.
