= New Hampshire Department of Justice =

Government agency in the U.S. state of New Hampshire

New Hampshire Department of Justice (NHDOJ)
Agency overview
- Jurisdiction: New Hampshire
- Headquarters: 1 Granite Place South Concord, New Hampshire
- Agency executive: John Formella, Attorney General
- Website: www.doj.nh.gov

The New Hampshire Department of Justice (NHDOJ) is a government agency of the U.S. state of New Hampshire. The department is led by the Attorney General of New Hampshire, currently John Formella. NHDOJ headquarters are located at 1 Granite Place South in Concord.

== Duties ==
Through its officials, the Department of Justice has all the powers and duties enumerated by the NH Revised Statutes Annotated and implied from the common law and is responsible for the following general functions, as provided in NH RSA 21-M:2:

- Advising and representing the state and its executive branch agencies in all civil legal matters.
- Supervising and conducting criminal investigations and prosecutions.
- Enforcing the various consumer protection and antitrust laws of the state.
- Assisting and advising those agencies charged with protecting the environment and enforcing the environmental laws of the state.

== Attorney General ==
The state's attorney general is the head of the Department of Justice and a constitutional officer of the state, under Part II, Article 46 of the Constitution of New Hampshire and is appointed by the Governor with approval of the Governor's Council to serve a four-year term.

The Attorney General acts as the state's attorney in all criminal and civil cases in the New Hampshire Supreme Court in which the state is interested, and in the prosecution of crimes punishable by death or life in prison, as well as managing other criminal and civil prosecutions.

== Divisions ==
The Department of Justice has two main divisions, the Division of Public Protection and Division of Legal Counsel, which are each headed by an Associate Attorney General.

=== Division of Public Protection ===
The Division of Public Protection has three statutory bureaus which are charged with protecting the State from crime, fraud and other dangers. The following are bureaus within the division:

- Criminal Justice Bureau - investigates and prosecutes major crimes as directed by the attorney general; Represents the state in all criminal appeals to the New Hampshire Supreme Court or federal courts; Investigates and prosecutes other criminal matters as the attorney general determines; Investigates and prosecutes Medicaid fraud as directed by the attorney general; and Represents the state in all post-conviction insanity proceedings. The bureau also has the following units:
  - Drug Prosecution/Asset Forfeiture
  - Economic Crime Unit
  - Investigations Section
  - Medicaid Fraud Control Unit - investigates and prosecutes violations all NH RSAs pertaining to fraud in connection with the federal and state Medicaid programs; and Investigates complaints alleging abuse or neglect or misappropriation of private funds of patients in any health care facilities receiving payments under the state Medicaid program.
  - Office of Victim/Witness Assistance - Provides information and services to victims and witnesses in criminal cases prosecuted by the attorney general and coordinates the statewide victim/witness rights information program.
- Consumer Protection and Antitrust Bureau - Receives, investigates, and attempts to resolve complaints by individual consumers of unfair or deceptive business practices; Brings civil and criminal actions in the name of the state to redress unfair or deceptive trade or business practices; Administers and enforces the provisions of various chapters in NH RSA Title XXXI: Trade and Commerce, which serve to protect consumers.
- Environmental Protection Bureau - Enforcing statutes pertaining to environmental protection, control, and preservation; Counsels state agencies and commissions given responsibility over environmental concerns; Exercises the common law powers of the attorney general to protect the environment; Brings public nuisance and other actions in superior court where and activity/activities complained may have a substantial impact upon the environment of the state.

=== Division of Legal Counsel ===
The Division of Legal Counsel has two statutory bureaus which are charged with providing legal advice and representing the state in legal matters and eminent domain. The following are bureaus within the division:

- Bureau of Civil Law - Provides advice and legal representation in civil matters for all executive branch agencies and for the state in land acquisition matters; and Regulates charitable trusts, as provided for by RSA 7:19 through 7:32-a in RSA Chapter 7.
- Transportation and Construction Bureau - Advises any department, division, bureau, or agency of the state whenever it contemplates the taking of or takes private property; and represents such agents of the state in the taking of any interest in private property.
