= Governor of New Hampshire =

Head of state and of government of the U.S. state of New Hampshire

- State seal

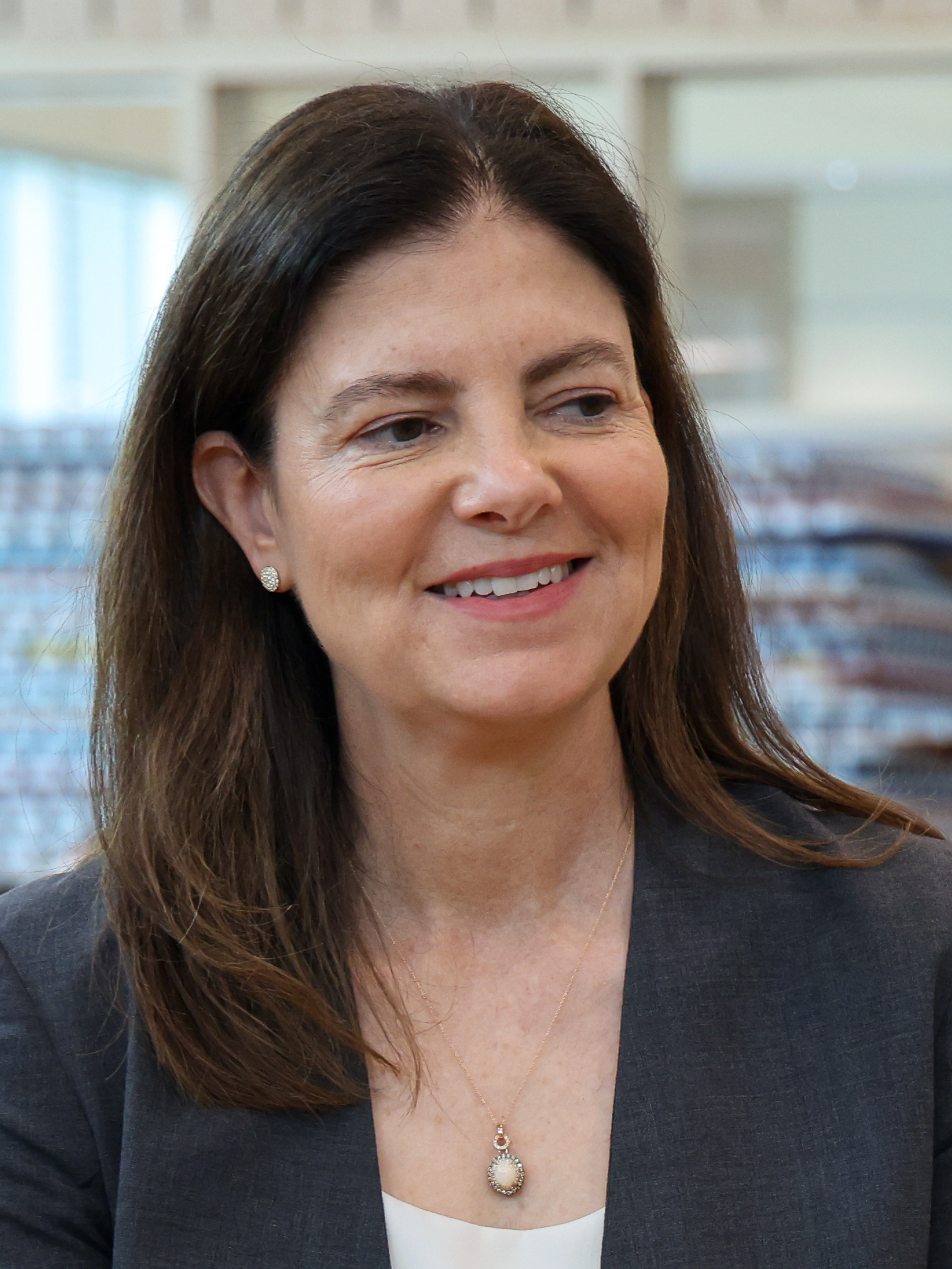
- Incumbent; Kelly Ayotte since January 9, 2025
- Government of New Hampshire
- Style: Governor (informal); Her Excellency (formal)
- Status: Head of state; Head of government
- Member of: Governor's Council; Cabinet
- Residence: Bridges House
- Seat: Concord, New Hampshire
- Term length: Two years, no term limits
- Constituting instrument: New Hampshire Constitution of 1776
- Precursor: Governor of Strawbery Banke 1630–1641; Governor of Dover 1631–1641; Governor of Massachusetts Bay 1641–1680
- Formation: January 21, 1680 (346 years ago)
- Succession: Line of succession
- Salary: $165,027 as of 2026
- Website: Official website

The governor of New Hampshire is the head of government of the U.S. state of New Hampshire.

The governor is elected during the biennial state general election in November of even-numbered years. New Hampshire is one of only two states, along with bordering Vermont, to hold gubernatorial elections every two years as opposed to every four. Currently, the state's 83rd governor is Republican Kelly Ayotte, who has served since January 9, 2025.

In New Hampshire, the governor has no term limit of any kind. Only two governors have served more than three terms since the 18th century (when the term was for only one year), John Lynch, who won a fourth two-year term on November 2, 2010, and Chris Sununu, who won a fourth two-year term on November 8, 2022. John Taylor Gilman had been the last governor before Lynch to serve longer than six years, serving 14 one-year terms as governor between 1794 and 1816. Gilman is one of seven governors to serve non-consecutive terms, the others being John Langdon, John Sullivan, William Plumer, Benjamin Pierce, James A. Weston, and John Gilbert Winant.

Unlike in many other states in which executive councils are merely advisory, the Executive Council of New Hampshire has a strong check on the governor's power. The five-member council has a veto over many actions of the governor. Together, the governor and Executive Council approve contracts with a value of $5,000 or more, approve pardons, and appoint the directors and commissioners, judges, the attorney general and officers in the National Guard.

To qualify as governor, a candidate must be 30 years of age or older, a registered voter, and domiciled in New Hampshire for at least seven years.

== Title ==
Traditionally, the governors of the colonial Province of New Hampshire were titled as "President of New Hampshire", beginning with the appointment of the province's first president, John Cutt, in 1679. After independence, from 1786 to 1791, "President of the State of New Hampshire" was the official style of the position. The New Hampshire Constitution was amended in 1791 to replace "President" with "Governor".

== Function ==
The Constitution of New Hampshire details the duties and powers of the governor:

- Act as a supreme executive magistrate
- Shall be responsible for the faithful execution of the laws
- When a disagreement exists between the two legislative chambers, the governor with advice of the executive council shall have the right to adjourn or prorogue the general court
- The governor may direct a session of the General Court to be held at another location within the state in cases where there is danger to the health or lives of the members
- Power to veto bills and resolutions presented to the governor by the General Court
- Nomination of all judicial officers, the attorney general, and all officers of the militia with the approval of the executive council
- Act as the commander-in-chief for all military forces of the state
- Power to pardon offenses, except those convicted by the Senate and impeached by the House
- Money issued out of the state treasury shall be by warrant under the hand of the governor and with advice of the council

== Succession ==
Established by Part 2, Article 49 of the Constitution of New Hampshire.

#	Office	Current officer
1	President of the Senate	Sharon Carson (R)
2	Speaker of the House of Representatives	Sherman Packard (R)
3	Secretary of State	David Scanlan (R)
4	State Treasurer	Monica Mezzapelle (NP)

== Timeline ==
Timeline of New Hampshire governors
