= Constitution of New Hampshire =

American state constitution

The Constitution of the State of New Hampshire is the fundamental law of the state of New Hampshire, with which all statute laws must comply. The constitution became effective June 2, 1784, when it replaced the state's constitution of 1776.

The constitution is divided into two parts: a Bill of Rights and a Form of Government. Subsections of each part are known as articles. For example, the subsection dealing with free speech and liberty of the press is cited as "Part I, Article 22" or "Pt. I, Art. 22."

== Part I – Bill of Rights ==
The first part of the constitution is made up of 43 articles, codifying many of the same natural rights as does the United States Constitution, including free speech, freedom of the press, jury trials, freedom of religion, and the right to bear arms. It protects citizens against double jeopardy, unreasonable searches and seizures, and being required to quarter soldiers. In most cases, the state constitution affords more specific protections than the U.S. Constitution. Unlike the U.S. Constitution, New Hampshire's Bill of Rights has been amended regularly since its adoption.

=== Article 2. Natural Rights ===
The constitution of 1784 codified several "natural, essential, and inherent rights" along the lines of the preamble to the United States Declaration of Independence. In 1974, this Article was amended to require equality of rights regardless of "race, creed, color, sex or national origin."

Several more recent constitutional amendments have codified additional rights, stressing their generality by adding text just below Article 2:

=== Article 2-a. The Bearing of Arms ===
Article 2-a, added in 1982, codifies the right to keep and bear arms more specifically than the Second Amendment to the United States Constitution. Article 2-a reads:

All persons have the right to keep and bear arms in defense of themselves, their families, their property and the state.

=== Article 2-b. Right of Privacy ===
In 2018, the right to privacy of information was codified in a new Article 2-b:

An individual's right to live free from governmental intrusion in private or personal information is natural, essential, and inherent.

=== Article 7. State Sovereignty ===
Article 7 asserts New Hampshire's sovereignty:

The people of this state have the sole and exclusive right of governing themselves as a free, sovereign, and independent state; and do, and forever hereafter shall, exercise and enjoy every power, jurisdiction, and right, pertaining thereto, which is not, or may not hereafter be, by them expressly delegated to the United States of America in congress assembled.

In practice, this assertion is superseded by the federalist structure of the U.S. government, notably the Supremacy Clause of the U.S. Constitution. From time to time, Article 7 is cited in New Hampshire politics, such as in the occasional bill to secede from the U.S. In 2011, the N.H. House passed a Concurrent Resolution that worked from Article 7 to argue that the state should resist all federal power not expressly delegated through the enumerated powers in the U.S. Constitution, but the N.H. Senate did not concur.

=== Article 10. Right of Revolution ===
New Hampshire is one of several states that codify a "Right of Revolution" in their state constitutions. The Right of Revolution dates back to the Revolutionary War. Article 10 reads:

Government being instituted for the common benefit, protection, and security, of the whole community, and not for the private interest or emolument of any one man, family, or class of men; therefore, whenever the ends of government are perverted, and public liberty manifestly endangered, and all other means of redress are ineffectual, the people may, and of right ought to reform the old, or establish a new government. The doctrine of nonresistance against arbitrary power, and oppression, is absurd, slavish, and destructive of the good and happiness of mankind.

=== Article 11. Elections and Elective Franchises. ===
In New Hampshire all elections are free and all inhabitants 18 or older are permitted to vote in their domicile. Persons convicted of "treason, bribery or any willful violation of the election laws of this state or of the United States" are excluded from voting in elections; which may be restored by the Supreme Court on notice to the Attorney General. The General Court is required to establish absentee ballot and voter qualification process for state and municipal ballot elections, which includes primaries. Polling and voter registration places are required to be "easily accessible to all persons" which specifically includes the disabled and elderly persons who are otherwise qualified to vote in the applicable election. Non-payment of any tax is not a permitted exclusion from voting. Every inhabitant of the state, having the proper qualifications, has equal right to be elected into office.

=== Article 12-a. Eminent domain ===
Article 12-a., which states that "No part of a person's property shall be taken by eminent domain...if the taking is for the purpose of private development...." was ratified in 2006. It was one of many actions that various states took, in the wake of Kelo v. City of New London the previous year, to limit the uses of eminent domain permitted by that decision.

=== Article 28-a. Unfunded mandates ===
Although counties, cities, and towns in New Hampshire are legal constructs of the state, Article 28-a. was added in 1984 to stop the practice by which the state expanded their duties. It provides that any "new, expanded or modified programs or responsibilities" must either be "fully funded by the state" or "approved for funding by a vote of the local legislative body...."

=== Article 36. Pensions ===
Article 36 barred the state from providing pensions except for "actual services...and never for more than one year at a time." Article 36–a was added in 1984 to clarify that the state retirement system is constitutional, and to earmark its funds to pay the benefits due retirees.

== Part II – Form of Government ==
Part Second contains 101 articles that specify how state government functions. Article 1 established The State of New Hampshire as the official name of the sovereign and independent state, formerly known as the province of New Hampshire. The remainder of Part II is subdivided in the following sections:

=== The General Court ===
Articles 2–8 establish the framework for the General Court and its authority to establish courts, enact state laws affecting the Government of New Hampshire, provide for the State's emergency powers, gather funding, and use collected monies.

=== House of Representatives ===
Articles 9–24 establish the authority and makeup of the House of Representatives, the lower house of the General Court. This section of the Constitution establishes how representatives are elected, their responsibilities, and their privileges. These articles make clear that all state-level budgetary legislation must originate from the House, much like the British House of Commons and the United States House of Representatives.

Articles 11 (formerly 10) and 11-a provide that representative districts are set by statute. Redistricting is often litigated. In 2002, the state supreme court dictated the districts. Article 11 was last amended in 2006 to provide that towns whose size entitles them to one representative will have their own representative, but to allow the use of floterial districts spanning several towns or wards to achieve greater precision.

Article 15, Compensation of the Legislature, fixes the pay for General Court members at $200 per term (two years) and $250 for the presiding officers. Legislators also receive mileage for "actual daily attendance on legislative days, but not after the legislature shall have been in session for 45 legislative days or after the first day of July following the annual assembly of the legislature."

=== Senate ===
Articles 25–40, excluding 28 which was repealed in 1976, define the role and makeup of The Senate, the upper house of the General Court. This section is similar to the section regarding the House of Representatives, with the largest difference that the Senate is the ultimate arbiter of all elections.

Articles 38–40 describe how state officers may be impeached and be punished for bribery, corruption, malpractice or maladministration, in office. The House of Representatives is given the authority to impeach state officers, while the Senate hears, tries, and determines all impeachments made by the House. The articles also state the rules for the Senate's impeachment hearings and provide for the Chief Justice of the New Hampshire Supreme Court to preside over the impeachment hearings involving the Governor, but not have a vote.

=== Executive Power – Governor ===
Articles 41–59 define the roles and selection of the Executive Branch. The Governor of the State of New Hampshire (originally styled "President") is the supreme executive magistrate and is titled "His Excellency". The Governor is given the sole authority to command the New Hampshire National Guard and sole right to sign or veto bills and resolutions passed by the General Court and is charged with the "faithful execution of the laws". The Governor is elected to a two-year term at the November biennial elections, and must be 30 years old and have been a resident of the state for seven years at the time of election.

With the advice of the Executive Council, the Governor has the authority to call the General Court into session when in recess, to adjourn it early, and dissolve the General Court as required for the welfare of the state. The Governor, with the advice of the Council, has the authority to pardon offense not for impeachment; and to nominate and appoint all judicial officers, Attorney General, and all officers of the navy, and general and field officers of the state National Guard.

Article 58 states, "the governor and council shall be compensated for their services, from time to time, by such grants as the general court shall think reasonable;" and Article 59 requires that "permanent and honorable salaries" be established by law, for the justices of the superior court.

=== Council ===
Articles 60–66 discuss the selection, ejection and conduct of the five Executive Councilors.

=== Secretary, Treasurer, etc. ===
Articles 67–70 discuss the duties and selection of the state's treasurer, secretaries and other such officials.

=== County Treasurer, etc. ===
Article 71 details the responsibilities and powers of county level officials such as the county sheriffs, county attorneys, county treasurers, registrars of probate, and registrars of deeds. Article 72 details the selection of registrars of deeds, which usually is a countywide position.

=== Judiciary Power ===
Articles 72-a.–81 dictate the rights and responsibilities of the Supreme and Superior Courts as well as other state sanctioned court officers.

=== Clerks of Courts ===
Article 82 gives judges of the courts (except probate) the sole authority to appoint clerks to serve office during the pleasure of the judge. Clerks are prohibited from acting as attorneys in the court of which they are a clerk and from drawing any writ originating a civil action.

=== Encouragement of Literature, Trade, etc. ===
The first half of Article 83 tasks future legislators to "cherish the interest of literature and the sciences, and all seminaries and public schools...." The text was amended in 1877 to clarify that state money could not go to religious schools.

In 1993, the New Hampshire supreme court agreed with school districts near Claremont in the first of several Claremont cases that Article 83 made equal public education a state responsibility. The Claremont cases began an era in which the supreme court repeatedly found school–funding legislation unconstitutional. In 2009, the court found the original suit was moot and the Claremont era ended. The General Court has debated, but has never approved, a constitutional amendment that would align the right of education with the legislature's spending authority. However, in 2025, the General Court asserted in law that it "shall make the final determination of what the state's educational policies shall be and of the funding needed to carry out such policies."

The second half of Article 83, added in 1903, empowers the state to regulate economic activity. It declares a right to "free and fair competition in the trades and industries" and specifies that a goal of regulation is to "prevent...combination, conspiracy, monopoly, or any other unfair means."

=== Oaths and Subscriptions Exclusion From Offices, etc. ===
Articles 84–101 (excluding Articles 97 and 99) regard the installment of appointed and elected state officials; and the method for the Constitution taking effect, it being enrolled, and methods for proposing amendments.

== Method of Amendment ==
Unlike the U.S. Constitution, in which amendments are set out beneath the main body (and brackets or strike-through are sometimes used to show text in the main body that an amendment has made inoperative), amendments to the New Hampshire constitution change the text in place. Although a law book with annotations describes amendments to the text, the actual amendment is not included in a presentation of the constitution; only the text as the amendment revised it. An amendment will sometimes add an article; for instance, an article following Article 12 will be called Article 12-a.

Amendments are proposed both to make policy changes and to make clerical changes such as gender neutrality.

Part II, Article 100 of the constitution provides for the following two methods of proposing amendments to the constitution:

=== General Court ===
A three-fifths vote of each house of the General Court is required to send a proposed constitutional amendment to ratification (see below).

=== Constitutional Convention ===
A majority vote of both houses of the General Court is required to place the following question on the ballot: "Shall there be a convention to amend or revise the constitution?" If such question has not been submitted to the people in ten years, the Secretary of State is required by Pt. II, Art. 100 to place the question on the ballot. A majority of qualified voters participating in an election is required to convene a convention. At the next election the delegates are elected by the people, or earlier as provided by the General Court. A three-fifths vote of the number of delegates is required to send a proposed constitutional amendment to ratification (see below).

=== Ratification ===
An amendment approved by either of the above methods is sent to the people at the next biennial November election. A two-thirds vote of the qualified voters participating in an election is required to ratify the amendment. If the amendment does not receive this vote, it does not take effect.

New Hampshire voters do not have the power to make or repeal laws through referendum, but a handful of proposed constitutional amendments routinely appear on the ballot in most general elections.

== History ==
=== 1776 Constitution ===
On January 5, 1776, the New Hampshire Congress met in Exeter and voted to establish a civil government, becoming the first American commonwealth to ratify its own constitution. Drafted at the urging of the Continental Congress, the 1776 Constitution replaced royal rule with a two-part legislature:

- The popularly elected convention that framed this Constitution was called a Congress. Its Constitution converted the convention into an ongoing House of Representatives (or Assembly).
- An upper house, the Council, would be selected by the House: twelve freeholders, a certain number from each county.

Should the conflict with Great Britain last beyond 1776, and barring instructions to the contrary from the Continental Congress, the Constitution provided for the popular election of the Councilors. Together, the Assembly and Council were responsible for running the government of the colony, including the appointment of all civil and military officers.

The Constitution intentionally excluded a chief executive. This reflected a clear break from the top-down authority of the colonial governor and marked a shift in public attitudes toward representative government. Unlike the unrest seen in 1772 during the Pine Tree Riot, where colonists took to tarring and feathering royal agents, the new government channeled popular will through elections and local control. Though the constitution lacked a Bill of Rights and was never submitted for a public vote, it signaled a major transformation: the people of New Hampshire had moved from resistance to self-governance.

=== 1783 Constitution ===
On June 5, 1781, a Convention was convened to write a new constitution. In the Spring of 1782, a draft of the constitution was sent to town meetings for ratification. Town meetings proposed amendments so substantial that the Convention redrafted the constitution and submitted it to town meetings in Fall 1782. The second draft was met with even more proposed amendments. A third draft was submitted and, in Spring 1783, a requisite number of town meetings accepted the third draft as is. On October 31, 1783, the Convention declared the constitution ratified and adjourned sine die. This constitution became effective June 2, 1784.

On September 7, 1791, a convention drafted 72 amendments to the 1784 Constitution, submitted to the people as a new whole document on February 8, 1792. These revisions became effective June 5, 1793. Some sources, falsely, claim that New Hampshire had a third constitution from 1792.

=== Recent amendments ===
Before 1964, the only method for amending the constitution was by convention every seven years. The adoption of an amendment to Pt. II, Art. 100 allowed for either the General Court or Constitutional Convention to submit amendments to the people for adoption.

New Hampshire has had seventeen constitutional conventions. They have proposed 64 amendments, of which the voters have ratified 26. On November 8, 2022, voters for the eighteenth time declined to call a constitutional convention, this time by a ratio of 66% to 34%.
