= United States v. Salerno =

- Supreme Court of the United States

Argued January 21, 1987 Decided May 26, 1987
- Full case name: United States v. Salerno
- Citations: 481 U.S. 739 (more) 107 S. Ct. 2095, 95 L. Ed. 2d 697, 1987 U.S. LEXIS 2259

Holding
- The Bail Reform Act's legitimate and compelling regulatory purpose and the procedural protections that it offers causes 18 U.S.C. § 3142(e) to be facially valid under the Due Process Clause and the Excessive Bail Clause.

Court membership
- Chief Justice William Rehnquist Associate Justices William J. Brennan Jr. · Byron White; Thurgood Marshall · Harry Blackmun; Lewis F. Powell Jr. · John P. Stevens; Sandra Day O'Connor · Antonin Scalia

Case opinions
- Majority: Rehnquist, joined by White, Blackmun, Powell, O'Connor, Scalia
- Dissent: Marshall, joined by Brennan
- Dissent: Stevens

Laws applied
- Fifth Amendment, Eighth Amendment; Bail Reform Act of 1984

United States v. Salerno, 481 U.S. 739 (1987), was a United States Supreme Court decision that determined that the Bail Reform Act of 1984 was constitutional, which permitted the federal courts to detain an arrestee prior to trial if the government could prove that the individual was potentially a danger to society. The Act was held to violate neither the United States Constitution's Due Process Clause of the Fifth Amendment nor its Excessive Bail Clause of the Eighth Amendment.

== Background ==
The case was brought up when the American Mafia member Anthony Salerno was arrested and indicted for violating the Racketeer Influenced and Corrupt Organizations Act.

== Decision ==
Chief Justice Rehnquist wrote the opinion for the majority.

The majority determined that detaining someone in anticipation of trial because they are considered dangerous was not a punishment under the Constitution.

Salerno is famous for expounding the "no set of circumstances" test. Challengers who bring a facial challenge to a statute claim the statute is "void on its face" and so should be declared unconstitutional. That is an extremely high burden, as the challenger must show that no set of circumstances exists under which the statute would be valid.

The Court, however, recognized the well-established overbreadth doctrine, which provides a different standard for facial challenges of laws that are alleged to violate the First Amendment.

Justice Marshall and Justice Stevens each wrote dissenting opinions. Marshall's dissent, joined by Brennan, broadly condemned the practice of preventive detention and described the majority opinion as illogical. Stevens was not willing to go quite as far because he believed there were some circumstances in which the government might constitutionally detain someone based on their future dangerousness, such as if they were known with "virtual certainty" to be about to kill a group of innocent people in the immediate future. Nonetheless, Stevens agreed with Marshall and said "[I]t is clear to me that a pending indictment may not be given any weight in evaluating an individual's risk to the community or the need for immediate detention. If the evidence of imminent danger is strong enough to warrant emergency detention, it should support that preventive measure regardless of whether the person has been charged, convicted, or acquitted of some other offense."

== Aftermath ==
In October 1988, Salerno was convicted and sentenced to 70 years in prison, including a $376,000 fine, and ordered to forfeit half of the racketeering proceeds (estimated to be $30 million). Salerno died in prison in 1992.

Salerno has been called "one of the most important cases in criminal procedure" because of the impact it has had on so many defendants. A person who is detained pretrial is far more likely to be convicted than a person who is released, often because the strain of being incarcerated coerces them into pleading guilty regardless of the merits of the case. For instance, one study showed that people who were detained until their case was resolved (i.e., including guilty pleas) was 92 percent.

== Sources ==
- Goldkamp, John S. (1985). "Danger and Detention: A Second Generation of Bail Reform". Journal of Criminal Law and Criminology. 76 (1): 1–74. doi:10.2307/1143353. JSTOR 1143353.
- Eason, Michael J. (1988). "Eighth Amendment: Pretrial Detention: What Will Become of the Innocent?". Journal of Criminal Law and Criminology. 78 (4): 1048–1079. doi:10.2307/1143417. JSTOR 1143417.
- Howard, John B. Jr. (1989). "The Trial of Pretrial Dangerousness: Preventive Detention after United States v. Salerno". Virginia Law Review. 75 (3): 639–679. doi:10.2307/1073254. JSTOR 1073254.
