= Peter Heed =

Peter W. Heed

26th Attorney General of New Hampshire
- In office October 18, 2003 – July 15, 2004
- Governor: Craig Benson
- Preceded by: Philip T. McLaughlin
- Succeeded by: Kelly Ayotte

Personal details
- Party: Republican
- Education: Dartmouth College; Cornell University Law School (J.D., 1975)

Peter Heed is an American lawyer and a former New Hampshire Attorney General.

== Career ==
Heed began his career in homicide prosecution for the New Hampshire Attorney General's Office in the 1970s. In 1980, he entered private practice. In 1999, Heed was elected Cheshire County Attorney. He served in that position from 2000 until 2003, when he became New Hampshire Attorney General. Heed resigned his position as New Hampshire Attorney General in 2004 following allegations of sexual misconduct.

After leaving his statewide position, Heed was again elected as Cheshire County Attorney in 2006. In December 2012, less than two months after being re-elected as Cheshire County Attorney, Heed announced he was retiring from public office to work for a private firm. In January 2013, Heed pleaded guilty to Driving While Intoxicated.

== Personal life ==
Heed has two sons. He races canoes competitively.

Legal offices
Preceded by	Attorney General of New Hampshire; 2003 - 2004	Succeeded by Kelly Ayotte
