= Kelly Ayotte =

Governor of New Hampshire since 2025

- Ayotte in 2025

83rd Governor of New Hampshire
- Incumbent
- Assumed office January 9, 2025
- Preceded by: Chris Sununu

United States Senator from New Hampshire
- In office January 3, 2011 – January 3, 2017
- Preceded by: Judd Gregg
- Succeeded by: Maggie Hassan

27th Attorney General of New Hampshire
- In office July 15, 2004 – July 17, 2009
- Governor: Craig Benson; John Lynch
- Preceded by: Peter Heed
- Succeeded by: Michael Delaney

Personal details
- Born: Kelly Ann Ayotte; June 27, 1968 (age 58) Nashua, New Hampshire, U.S.
- Party: Republican (2003–present)
- Other political affiliations: Independent (before 2003)
- Spouse: Joseph Daley (m. 2001)
- Children: 2
- Education: Pennsylvania State University (BA); Villanova University (JD)
- Website: Office website Campaign website
- Ayotte's voice Ayotte questions witnesses on reforming the defense acquisition system. Recorded April 30, 2014

Kelly Ann Ayotte (/ˈeɪɒt/ AY-ott; born June 27, 1968) is an American attorney and politician serving since 2025 as the 83rd governor of New Hampshire. A member of the Republican Party, she served from 2011 to 2017 as a United States senator from New Hampshire and from 2004 to 2009 as the 27th attorney general of New Hampshire.

Born in Nashua, New Hampshire, Ayotte is a graduate of Pennsylvania State University, and Villanova University School of Law. She worked as a law clerk at the New Hampshire Supreme Court before entering private practice. She served as a prosecutor for the New Hampshire Department of Justice and briefly as the legal counsel to Governor Craig Benson before returning to the New Hampshire Department of Justice to serve as deputy attorney general. In 2004, Benson appointed Ayotte as attorney general of New Hampshire after Peter Heed resigned. She became the first woman to serve as New Hampshire's attorney general. She was twice reappointed by Governor John Lynch. Ayotte resigned as attorney general in 2009 to run for the U.S. Senate after Senator Judd Gregg announced his retirement.

In September 2010, Ayotte narrowly defeated lawyer Ovide Lamontagne in the Republican primary for the U.S. Senate. She then defeated Democratic congressman Paul Hodes in the general election with 60% of the vote. Ayotte was mentioned as a possible running mate for Republican nominee Mitt Romney in the 2012 presidential election. In 2016, Democratic Governor Maggie Hassan defeated Ayotte in her reelection bid by 1,017 votes (0.14%). After President Donald Trump nominated Judge Neil Gorsuch to the United States Supreme Court, the Trump administration chose Ayotte to be the sherpa in charge of the White House team for Gorsuch's confirmation.

Ayotte was elected governor of New Hampshire in 2024, defeating Democratic nominee Joyce Craig.

== Early life and education ==
Kelly Ann Ayotte was born in Nashua, New Hampshire, on June 27, 1968, the daughter of Kathleen M. (née Sullivan) and Marc Frederick Ayotte. Her father's family is of French–Canadian descent. Ayotte attended Nashua High School and received a B.A. from Pennsylvania State University in political science. At Penn State, she was initiated into the Delta Gamma sorority, served as Panhellenic Council President, and was a member of the secretive Senior Honor Society Lion's Paw. In 1993, Ayotte received a J.D. from Villanova University School of Law, where she served as editor of the Environmental Law Journal.

Ayotte clerked for Sherman D. Horton, associate justice of the New Hampshire Supreme Court, for one year. From 1994 to 1998, she was an associate at McLane, Graf, Raulerson & Middleton, a Manchester law firm.

In 1998, Ayotte joined the office of the New Hampshire attorney general as a prosecutor. In 2001, she married Joseph Daley, a pilot in the National Guard. In 2003, Ayotte became legal counsel to Governor Craig Benson. Three months later, she returned to the attorney general's office as deputy attorney general. In June 2004, Benson appointed Ayotte as attorney general of the state of New Hampshire after Peter Heed resigned.

== Attorney General of New Hampshire (2004-2009) ==
=== Clean air emissions standards ===
Ayotte joined eight other states' attorneys general to sue federal regulators over a rules change that made clean air emissions standards for power plants less strict and eliminated clean air reporting and monitoring requirements.

In 2005, the court agreed with Ayotte and the others that the Environmental Protection Agency must measure changes in the emissions from power plants and could not exempt power plants from reporting their emissions.

=== Prosecution of murder cases ===
As assistant attorney general, Ayotte prosecuted two defendants for the 2001 Dartmouth College murders in Etna, New Hampshire.

As attorney general, Ayotte prosecuted the high-profile case surrounding the 2006 murder of Manchester police officer Michael Briggs in the line of duty. It resulted in a conviction and death penalty sentence. Members of Briggs' family praised her leadership in ads for her 2010 Senate campaign.

=== Ayotte v. Planned Parenthood of Northern New England ===
In 2003, the United States District Court for the District of New Hampshire found the Parental Notification Prior to Abortion Act, a New Hampshire law requiring parental notification of a minor's abortion, unconstitutional, and enjoined its enforcement. In 2004, New Hampshire Attorney General Peter Heed appealed the ruling to the United States Court of Appeals for the First Circuit, which affirmed the district court's ruling. In 2004, Ayotte appealed the First Circuit's ruling to the Supreme Court, over the objection of incoming Governor John Lynch. She personally argued the case before the Supreme Court. The Supreme Court unanimously vacated the district court's ruling and remanded the case back to the district court, holding that it was improper for the district court to invalidate the statute completely instead of just severing its problematic portions or enjoining its unconstitutional applications. In 2007, the New Hampshire legislature repealed the law, mooting the need for rehearing by the district court.

In 2008, Planned Parenthood sued to recover its attorney fees and court costs from the New Hampshire Department of Justice. In 2009, Ayotte, as attorney general, authorized a payment of $300,000 to Planned Parenthood to settle the suit.

=== New Hampshire Institute of Politics ===
While attorney general, Ayotte served as a member of the Public Advisory Board at the New Hampshire Institute of Politics at Saint Anselm College. In 2011, she returned to the Institute as a senator to talk to political science students.

In 2013, Ayotte attended a forum at Saint Anselm College to explain the Never Contract With the Enemy Act (S. 675), which she co-sponsored with Richard Blumenthal. She was accompanied by Special Inspector General for Iraq Reconstruction Stuart Bowen. They addressed military contractor fraud and how to prevent funds paid to military contractors in Afghanistan and Iraq from winding up in the hands of parties hostile to the United States.

== U.S. Senate (2011-2017) ==
=== Elections ===
==== 2010 ====
Ayotte resigned as attorney general on July 7, 2009, to explore a run for U.S. Senate in 2010. The crowded Republican primary field included former congressional and gubernatorial candidate Ovide M. Lamontagne, businessman and owner of NH1 News William Harrison Binnie, and State Representative Tom Alciere. Ayotte had never run for office, but narrowly won the primary election on September 14, 2010. Ayotte was endorsed by John McCain, Sarah Palin, John Thune, Tom Coburn, Mitt Romney, Tim Pawlenty, Haley Barbour, and Rick Santorum. In the general election, she defeated Democratic nominee U.S. Representative Paul Hodes, 60% to 37%.

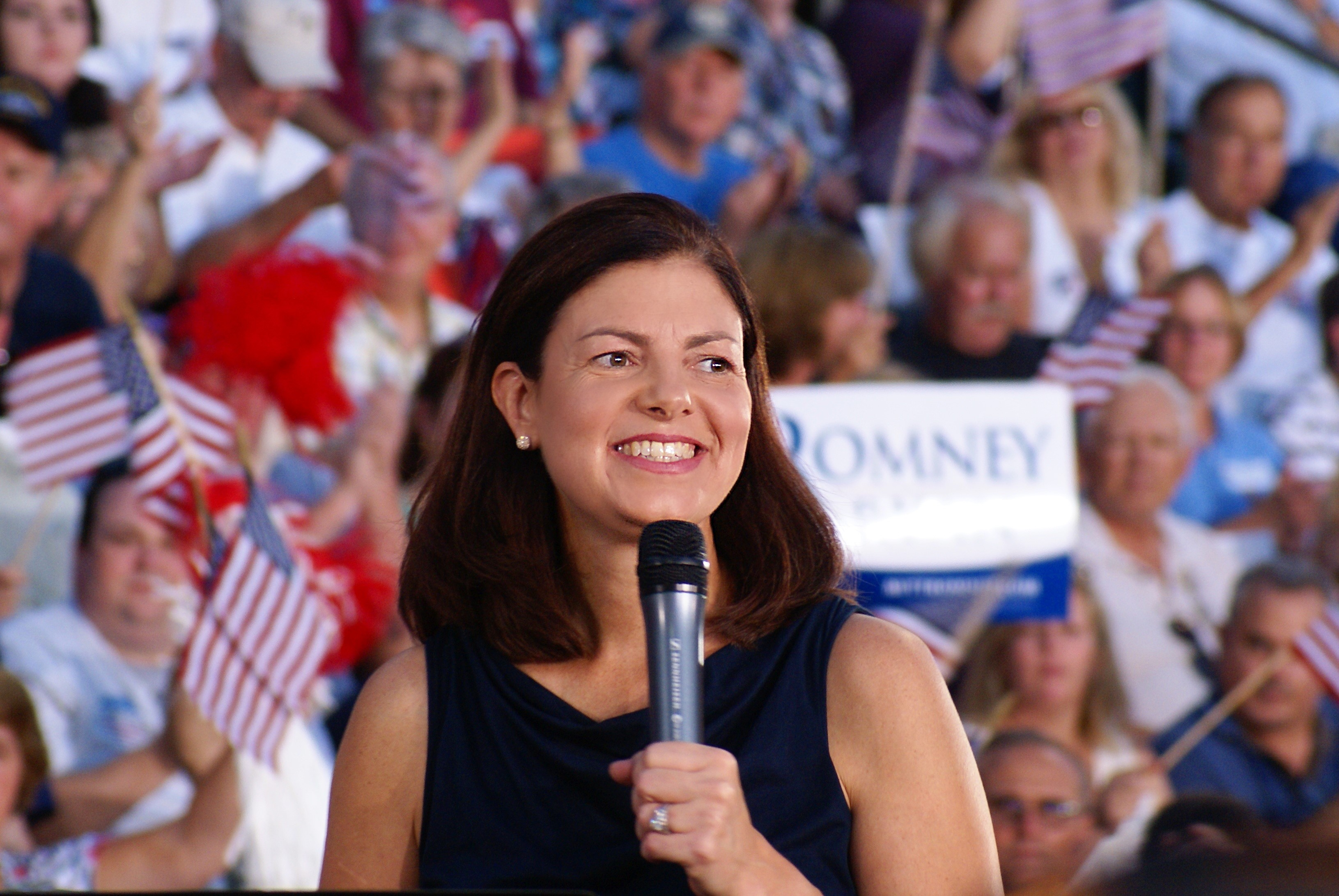
Senator Ayotte speaking for 2012 Republican Presidential Candidate Mitt Romney

==== 2016 ====
In 2016, Ayotte ran for reelection to the U.S. Senate against Maggie Hassan, New Hampshire's sitting governor.

In February 2016, the Koch Brothers-linked conservative advocacy group Americans for Prosperity announced that Ayotte was the lone vulnerable Republican U.S. senator the group would not support in 2016, due to her support for the Clean Power Plan to combat climate change.

On May 4, 2016, an Ayotte spokeswoman said Ayotte "intends to support the Republican nominee" for U.S. president but did not plan to make an endorsement. In October 2016, after lewd sexual comments Republican nominee Donald Trump made in a 2005 video came to light, Ayotte said that as a mother and a former prosecutor who had worked with victims, she could no longer vote for Trump, and would write in Mike Pence for president.

Ayotte lost her seat to Hassan by 1,017 votes.

==== Endorsements ====
Ayotte was endorsed by the New Hampshire Troopers' Association, the New England Narcotics Enforcement Officers' Association, and the Manchester Police Patrolmen's Association. She was also endorsed by the New Hampshire Union Leader, the Nashua Telegraph, the Caledonian-Record, and the Portsmouth Herald. The Herald endorsement was notable as it had endorsed Ayotte's opponent, Maggie Hassan, in Hassan's previous runs for office.

=== Tenure ===
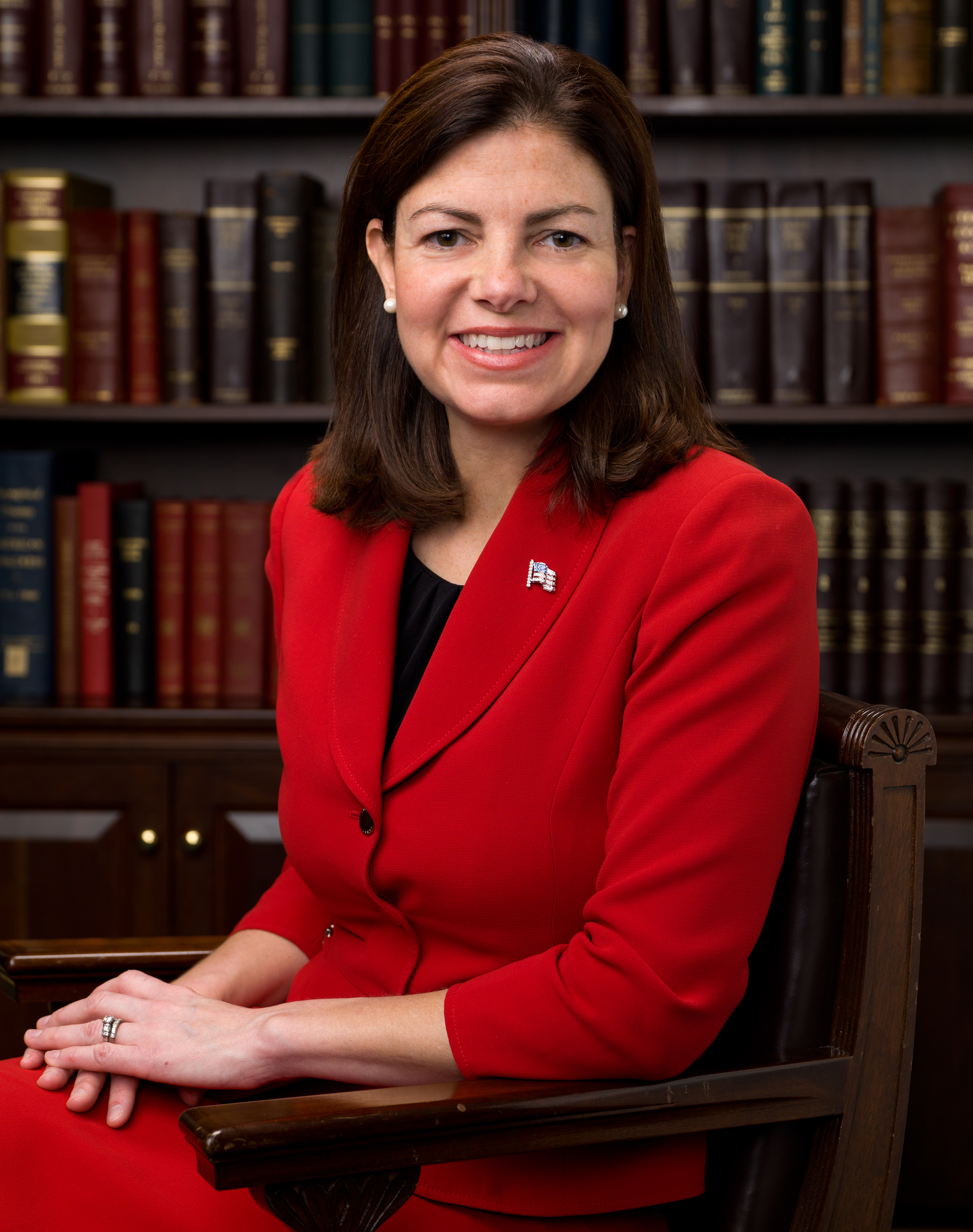
Ayotte during the 112th United States Congress

==== Jobs and the economy ====
Ayotte helped include provisions in the Every Student Succeeds Act to boost STEM education, particularly among girls and underrepresented minorities, and to support career and technical education in schools.

Ayotte strongly opposed the National Oceanic and Atmospheric Administration's proposal to pass significant at-sea monitoring costs to New Hampshire's fishermen and brought NOAA officials to New Hampshire to hear from fishermen. NOAA later backed off from the proposal.

==== National security ====
Ayotte served on the Senate Armed Services and Homeland Security Committees and was widely regarded as a leader on national security and foreign policy.

Ayotte led legislative efforts to keep suspected terrorists at Guantanamo Bay rather than closing it and transferring them to U.S. soil.

She was an outspoken critic of the Iran nuclear deal, saying that Iran is the largest state sponsor of terrorism in the world. She proposed strict new sanctions on Iran.

Ayotte was critical of the Obama administration's response to ISIS and called for increased airstrikes against ISIS.

==== Opiate and opioid response ====
Ayotte was one of four senators, two Republicans and two Democrats, who introduced the Comprehensive Addiction and Recovery Act, federal legislation to support local solutions and implement a comprehensive federal strategy to tackle the heroin and prescription opioid abuse epidemic. The bill was structured around prevention, treatment, recovery, and support for first responders.

Ayotte also cosponsored bills to improve care for infants born addicted or in withdrawal and help expectant and new mothers struggling with addiction get treatment. She backed successful efforts to better look after kids in schools who are struggling with addiction issues at home and to stop the flow of drugs across the southern border.

In 2007, New Hampshire, under then-Attorney-General Ayotte, was the only New England state not to join a lawsuit against Purdue Pharma for falsely advertising OxyContin. Purdue Pharma ultimately settled the case for $600 million, with $19.5 million being disbursed among 26 states' and the District of Columbia's substance abuse and opioid response programs.

From 2009 to 2015, then-Senator Ayotte also received $138,650 from pharmaceutical companies and their lobbyists, more than any other New Hampshire politician in that period.

==== College affordability ====
Ayotte was a vocal proponent of reauthorizing the Perkins Loan program, as she argued roughly 5,000 New Hampshire students relied on it.

==== Military and veterans issues ====
Ayotte routinely included provisions in annual defense authorization bills that supported the work being done at Portsmouth Naval Shipyard and Pease Air National Guard Base, and by the New Hampshire National Guard. She also strongly opposed further rounds of the base realignment and closing commission.

Ayotte included provisions in the Veterans' Access to Care through Choice, Accountability, and Transparency Act of 2014 to allow New Hampshire veterans to receive medical care closer to home. She was the only member of the New Hampshire delegation to vote against a budget proposal the singled out veterans' benefits for cuts. She offered and cosponsored legislation to give veterans access to cutting-edge prosthetics, strengthen mental health services for veterans and their families, and improve the support system for military families.

==== Fiscal policy and taxes ====
Ayotte supported tax reform to simplify the tax code and lower rates. She said she believed it would help bring back trillions of dollars parked overseas.

In December 2015, Ayotte voted to suspend the Medical Device Tax, which she said threatened nearly 3,500 manufacturing jobs in New Hampshire. She was also a leading opponent of the Internet sales tax.

Ayotte supported a balanced budget amendment to the Constitution and helped pass the Senate's first balanced budget in 14 years.

Ayotte offered a variety of legislation to eliminate wasteful spending and duplicate or unnecessary programs.

==== Women and family policies ====
Ayotte offered the Gender Advancement in Pay Act to implement New Hampshire's equal pay law at the federal level.

Ayotte and Jeanne Shaheen cosponsored a bill to combat pregnancy discrimination in the workplace and ensure expectant mothers can continue working during pregnancy.

She offered and cosponsored legislation to make it easier for employers to offer flex-time to working parents and to expand access to affordable childcare.

=== Legislation ===
Ayotte sponsored 217 bills, including:

==== 112th Congress (2011–2012) ====
- S. 2320, a bill to treat Clark Veterans Cemetery in the Republic of the Philippines as a permanent military cemetery in a foreign country under the purview of the American Battle Monuments Commission, and to have the Commission restore and maintain the cemetery, introduced April 19, 2012. This bill did not become law, but an agreement has since been made between the U.S. and Philippine governments to do what the bill intended.

==== 113th Congress (2013–2014) ====
- S. 31, a bill to permanently ban state and local governments from imposing taxes on the access to the internet and on goods sold by means of the internet, introduced January 22, 2013.
- S. 263, a bill to prohibit federal agencies from hiring more than one employee for every three full-time employees who leave employment from that agency until the Office of Management and Budget determines that employment in that agency is at least 10% less than it was previously, and to prohibit members of Congress from receiving a cost-of-living adjustment (COLA) in their pay in years in which the federal government has a budget deficit, introduced February 7, 2013.
- S. 1406, introduced July 31, 2013, a bill to permit the Secretary of Agriculture to issue regulations for the issuance of permits for people hired for the management of horse shows, exhibitions, auctions, and sales, requiring them to be qualified to identify instances of soring. People receiving the permits must be cleared of any potential conflicts of interest and preference is to be given to accredited veterinarians. The bill further makes it a crime to sell, auction, exhibit, or race any sore horse, and bans Tennessee Walking Horses, Racking horses, and Spotted Saddle horses from being sold, auctioned, exhibited, or raced if they are equipped with any action device (which the bill defines) or equipment that would alter the horse's gait. A companion bill was introduced in the House of Representatives as H.R. 1518.
- S. 1764, a bill to prohibit the Department of Defense from retiring the Fairchild Republic A-10 Thunderbolt II until a sufficient number of Lockheed Martin F-35 Lightning IIs have been constructed to replace the existing A-10s, introduced November 21, 2013.

=== Committee assignments (114th Congress) ===
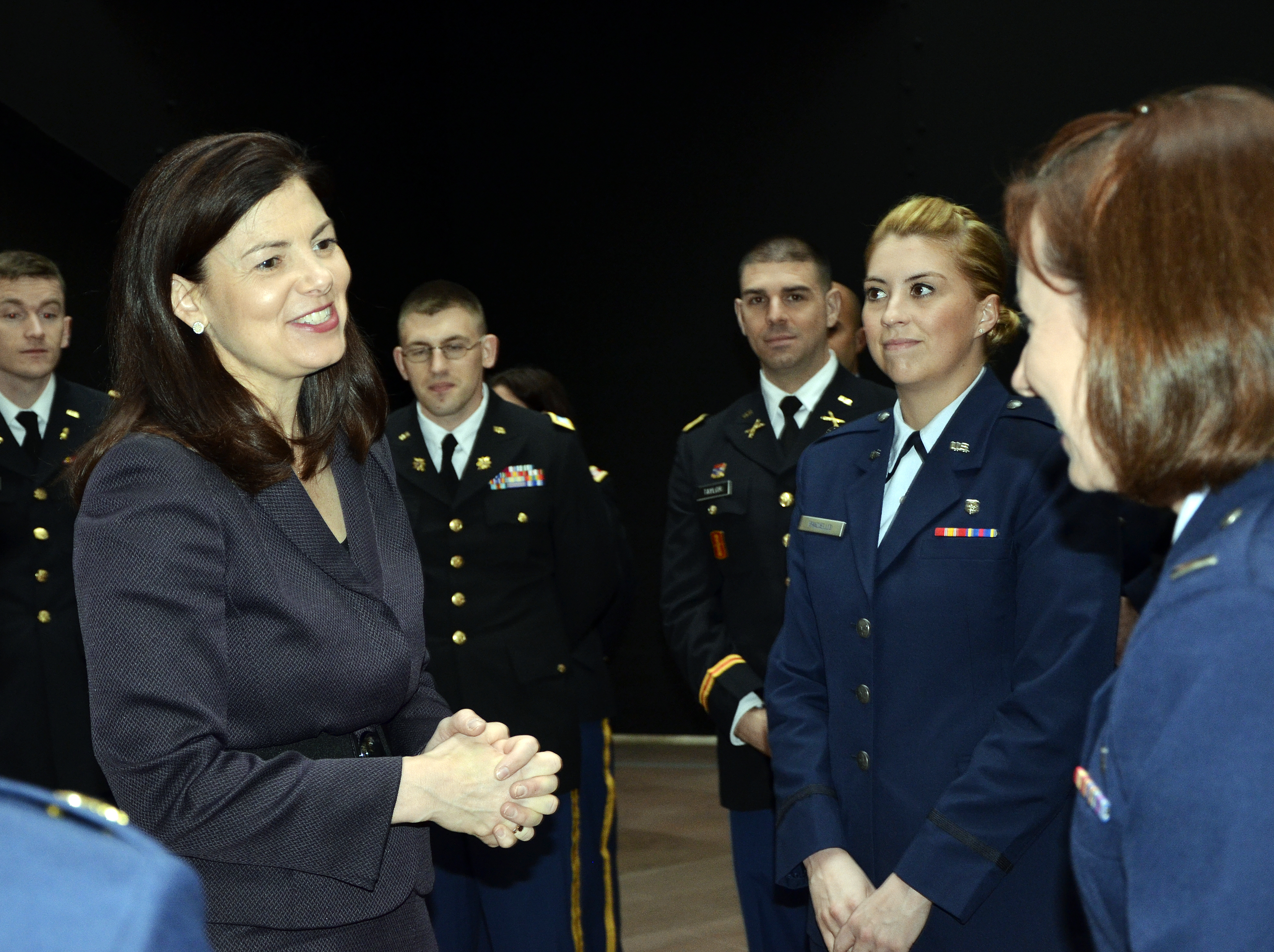
Senator Ayotte meets with junior officers of New Hampshire National Guard.

- Committee on Armed Services
  - Subcommittee on Emerging Threats and Capabilities
  - Subcommittee on Readiness and Management Support (chair)
  - Subcommittee on Seapower
- Committee on the Budget
- Committee on Commerce, Science, and Transportation
  - Subcommittee on Aviation Operations, Safety, and Security (chair)
  - Subcommittee on Communications, Technology, and the Internet
  - Subcommittee on Oceans, Atmosphere, Fisheries, and Coast Guard
  - Subcommittee on Surface Transportation and Merchant Marine Infrastructure, Safety, and Security
- Committee on Homeland Security and Governmental Affairs
  - Permanent Subcommittee on Investigations
  - Federal Spending Oversight and Emergency Management
- Committee on Small Business and Entrepreneurship

=== Consideration for vice-presidential nomination ===
Ayotte was mentioned as a possible running mate for Republican nominee Mitt Romney in the 2012 presidential election. Before the 2016 Republican Party presidential primaries, she was regarded as one of the most likely candidates if the Republican nominee selected a woman in order to balance the ticket against a Democratic ticket likely to be led by Hillary Clinton (the Democratic primary's front-runner).

=== Awards during Senate tenure ===
During her time in the Senate, Ayotte received a number of awards for her legislative activity from various civic organizations and interest groups, including the National Retail Federation, CCAGW PAC, the AARP, Save the Children, the New Hampshire Veterans of Foreign Wars, the National Association of Police Organizations, and the Appalachian Trail Conservancy.

== Governor of New Hampshire (2025–present) ==
After the end of her Senate career in 2017, Ayotte worked primarily in the private sector, and was named to several corporate boards of directors, including those of Caterpillar Inc., News Corp., BAE Systems, Boston Properties, Blink Health, Bloom Energy, and Blackstone Group. After New Hampshire Governor Chris Sununu announced he would retire at the end of his term in 2024, Ayotte announced her candidacy for governor. Throughout the race, the election was considered a tossup, as neither Ayotte nor Democratic nominee Joyce Craig had a clear lead in polling. Ayotte won, 54% to 44%.

=== Merrimack ICE facility ===
On December 24, 2025, the Washington Post reported that the Department of Homeland Security (DHS) was planning to use a "large warehouse" in Merrimack, New Hampshire, for immigrant detention as part of the Trump administration's immigration crackdown. New Hampshire state officials and Merrimack town officials said they were unaware of the plans. Merrimack town manager Paul Micali said he had "no knowledge of an ICE facility coming to Merrimack". On January 8, 2026, WMUR reported that Ayotte had "not been notified or consulted about rumored plans for an Immigration and Customs Enforcement facility in Merrimack". Ayotte said New Hampshire's Department of Safety was "in contact with the Department of Homeland Security all the time, and we haven't heard any notification of that". Several protests have been held across New Hampshire in response to the alleged facility and increased activity by Immigration and Customs Enforcement (ICE) in the state.

On February 3, 2026, the American Civil Liberties Union (ACLU) of New Hampshire filed a public records request with the Division of Historical Resources (NHDHR) regarding documents relating to the Merrimack warehouse and found that the NHDHS and the DHS had been working together to secure it for the purpose of immigrant detention as early as January 12. Ayotte's office released a letter reading, "It is entirely unacceptable that the Department of Natural and Cultural Resources failed to share this information with the governor's office", and NHDHR commissioner Sarah Stewart "indicated she was not notified either". Stewart resigned the next day. On February 12, Ayotte released two documents she said she received from DHS detailing the "Detention Reengineering Initiative". The document's opening paragraph contained an erroneous line referencing the facility's impact on "the Oklahoma economy", which drew criticism from news outlets. DHS corrected the error shortly thereafter. Ayotte did not say when she had received these documents from DHS.

On February 6, during a Senate Committee on Homeland Security and Governmental Affairs hearing, New Hampshire Senator Maggie Hassan asked acting ICE Director Todd Lyons about the proposed facility. Lyons said he "had shared an economic impact summary of the potential facility in Merrimack with Ayotte". Ayotte denied this. Lyons also said DHS would not cancel plans to use the facility for immigration detention due to community opposition.

On February 24, Ayotte announced that DHS would no longer be establishing the detention facility in Merrimack. After meeting with Noem, Ayotte said, "I thank Secretary Noem for hearing the concerns of the Town of Merrimack and for the continued cooperation between DHS and New Hampshire law enforcement".

The extent to which Ayotte knew of the federal government's use of the facility and the NHDHR's communications is unclear, but has led to condemnation from local lawmakers and the public.

== Political positions ==
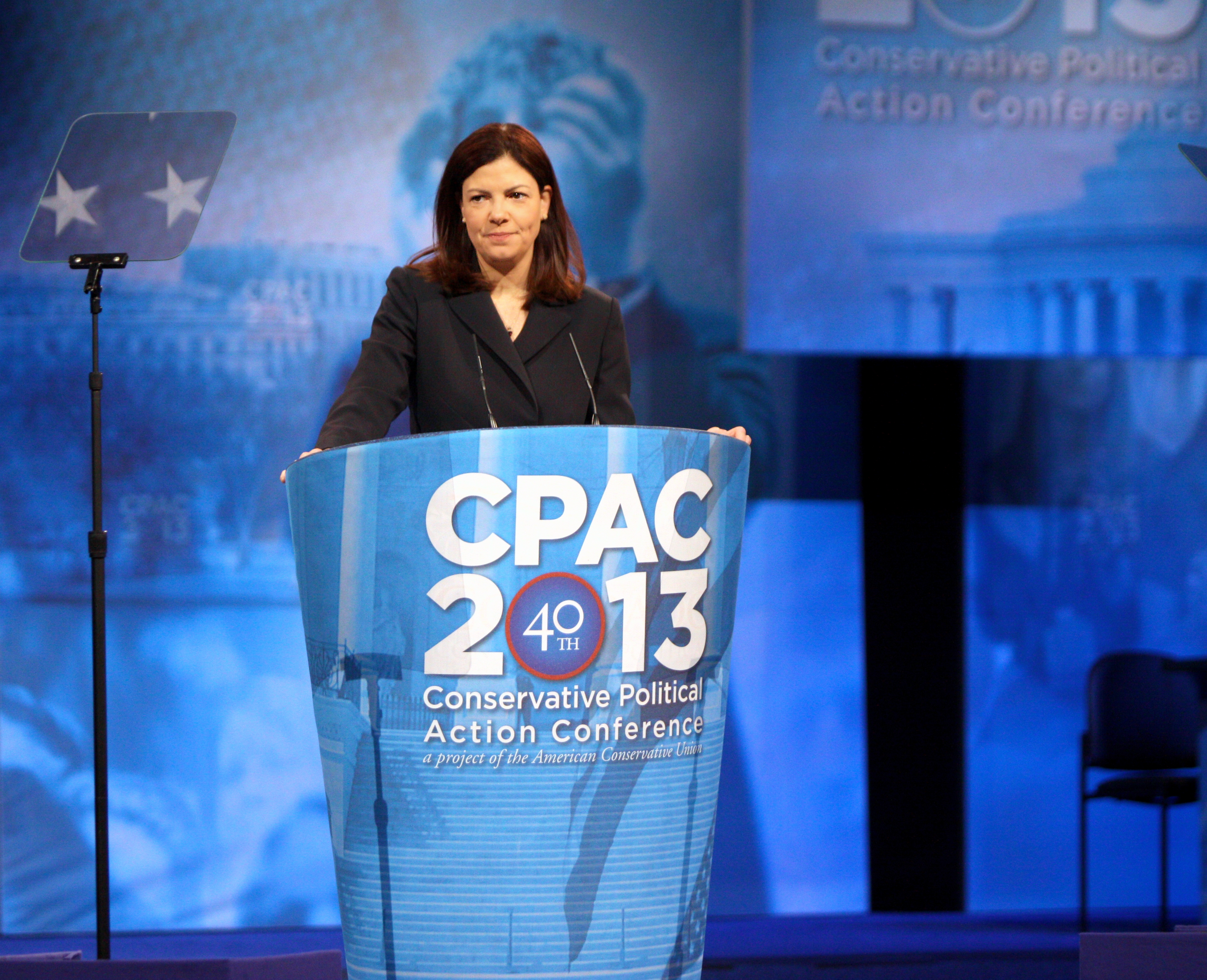
Senator Ayotte speaking at the 2013 Conservative Political Action Conference (CPAC)

During her U.S. Senate term, Ayotte was described as both a conservative Republican and a centrist. After her 2010 election, the Associated Press called her "a conservative Republican", and two years later NBC News described her "unique identity in the Senate as a Northeastern conservative Republican woman." She demonstrated centrist tendencies in her voting record and worked with Democrats on some issues. The New York Times described her as a moderate Republican. The Lugar Center at Georgetown University ranked Ayotte as the 11th most bipartisan member of the U.S. Senate during the 113th Congress. The American Conservative Union gave her a 64% lifetime score and the progressive Americans for Democratic Action gave her a 35% score; the nonpartisan National Journal gave her a composite score of 67% conservative and 33% liberal based on her voting record.

During her gubernatorial campaign, Ayotte expressed fiscally conservative positions, using the slogan "Don't Mass it up" to contrast her views "against more liberal Massachusetts to the south". She called herself a "strong conservative" while adding she would continue Sununu's legacy. Addressing voters after she was elected governor, she told those who did not vote for her that she was open to bipartisan cooperation.

=== Donald Trump ===
Ayotte initially backed Donald Trump's 2016 presidential bid before rescinding her endorsement before the election. She endorsed Trump's 2024 presidential bid.

=== Immigration policy ===
Ayotte voted for the comprehensive immigration reform bill (the Border Security, Economic Opportunity, and Immigration Modernization Act of 2013) brought forward by the bipartisan Gang of Eight, calling it a "a thoughtful, bipartisan solution to a tough problem". In 2024, she retracted that support for a pathway to citizenship for immigrants. She has been a vocal critic of the practice of sanctuary cities and voted to withhold federal funding from municipalities that refuse to cooperate with federal immigration officials. She also said in a debate that she supports a task force to patrol the U.S.-Canada border.

Ayotte did not support Hillary Clinton's proposal to bring an additional 65,000 Syrian refugees to the United States, unless stricter vetting was implemented to "guarantee to the American people that none of the individuals that are being brought to the United States have any connections to ISIS."

=== Economic policy ===
==== Minimum wage ====
Ayotte opposes increasing the minimum wage, and opposes federal legislation to index the minimum wage to inflation to reflect adjustments in the cost of living. She said she supports the current federal minimum wage but that "each state should decide what is best" when it comes to raising it.

==== Social Security ====
In 2010, Ayotte said she was open to raising the Social Security retirement age for younger workers in an effort to avoid long-term insolvency, but does not support changes for people at or near retirement.

==== Labor issues ====
Ayotte opposed passage of the Employee Free Choice Act ("Card Check"), which would have amended the National Labor Relations Act to allow employees to unionize whenever the National Labor Relations Board verified that 50% of the employees had signed authorization cards, therefore bypassing a secret ballot election.

In April 2014, the Senate debated the Paycheck Fairness Act. The bill would have punished employers for retaliating against workers who share wage information and put the justification burden on employers as to why someone is paid less while allowing workers to sue for punitive damages of wage discrimination. Ayotte said that one of her reasons for voting against ending debate on the bill was that Majority Leader Harry Reid had refused to allow votes on any of the amendments that Republicans had suggested for the bill. Ayotte offered her own equal pay bill, the Gender Advancement in Pay Act, which would implement New Hampshire's equal pay law at the federal level, but was "a little stronger in its anti-retaliation provision because it explicitly addresses written policies".

In April 2014, Ayotte voted to extend federal funding for unemployment benefits. Federal funding had been initiated in 2008 and expired at the end of 2013.

In March 2015, Ayotte voted for an amendment to establish a deficit-neutral reserve fund to allow employees to earn paid sick time. She also offered a bill to give private-sector employers the statutory authority to offer optional flex-time.

==== Fiscal policy (taxes and spending) ====
Ayotte favors a balanced budget amendment to the U.S. Constitution. She advocated for such an amendment as a member of the Senate Budget Committee.

In 2010, Ayotte criticized the 2008 bailouts, saying, "I wouldn't have supported the TARP or the bailouts... I do not think we should have bailed out the private sector."

Ayotte called for federal budget cuts to reduce the federal debt and deficits, proposing in 2010 that every government department cut its budget by 20 percent from current levels, though "some may cut more, some may cut less".

Ayotte favored the permanent repeal of the estate tax and has co-sponsored legislation to repeal the tax.

During the standoff over increasing the national debt limit in 2011, Ayotte pushed for greater cuts in government spending and voted against the eventual deal.

Ayotte pushed to end congressional earmarks and cosponsored legislation to ban the practice.

==== Financial regulation ====
Ayotte opposed the Dodd–Frank Wall Street Reform and Consumer Protection Act. She said that the legislation failed to directly address problems with Fannie Mae and Freddie Mac and imposed additional regulatory burdens on community banks.

=== Climate and energy ===
In 2010, when asked about climate change, Ayotte acknowledged that "there is scientific evidence that demonstrates there is some impact from human activities" but added, "I don't think the evidence is conclusive." She opposed both a cap-and-trade system and a carbon tax to reduce carbon emissions. In 2012, Ayotte voted with four other Republican senators to defeat a proposal to block the Environmental Protection Agency from promulgating the first federal standards regulating air pollution from power plants. In 2013, she voted for a point of order opposing a carbon tax or a fee on carbon emissions.

Ayotte was one of two Republican senators to vote against a Republican measure introduced by Roy Blunt that sought to block President Obama from negotiating an international agreement on climate change. She voted to fast-track approval for the Keystone XL pipeline project.

In October 2015, Ayotte became the first congressional Republican to endorse a measure by President Obama dubbed the Clean Power Plan, which would seek a 32 percent cut in the power sector's carbon emissions. That same year she was one of five Republican senators to vote to pass a non-binding amendment stating that "climate change is real and human activity significantly contributes to climate change."

=== Healthcare ===
Ayotte favored repealing the Affordable Care Act (Obamacare) and repeatedly voted to repeal it. She called the ACA a "success tax" on successful businesses and said it drove up the costs of healthcare. In November 2013, amid growing concerns over the launch of HealthCare.gov, particularly relating to delays associated with initial online signups for health coverage, Ayotte called for a "time out" on the ACA, suggesting instead to "convene a group of bipartisan leaders to address healthcare concerns in this country because this is not working."

Ayotte supported state-administered healthcare programs such as SCHIP and federal tax credits that serve to reduce the number of uninsured.

Ayotte received the American Foundation for Suicide Prevention's Congressional Award in recognition of her support for increasing mental health resources.

Ayotte advocated passage of the Comprehensive Addiction and Recovery Act (CARA), which was intended to address opioid abuse. The bill would increase funding for treatment of addiction and allow nurses and physician assistants to treat substance use disorder with medication, which Ayotte said would increase the treatment options available.

=== Judiciary ===
Ayotte joined all Senate Republicans in refusing to hold a hearing on Merrick Garland's nomination to the Supreme Court. After leaving the Senate, she served as sherpa for Neil Gorsuch's nomination by Donald Trump to the vacancy. In this role, she led the White House team that guided Gorsuch through his confirmation process, escorting him to meetings and hearings on Capitol Hill.

=== Social issues ===
==== Abortion and reproductive rights ====
In 2024, Ayotte said she supported current New Hampshire abortion law, which permits abortion on request until 24 weeks of pregnancy. She said she would veto any legislation restricting abortion during the first 24 weeks. Previously, she said she opposed abortion except in cases of rape, incest, or danger to the life of the mother. In 2010, she said Roe v. Wade should be overturned. In 2014, Ayotte led a Republican effort to call for a vote on a bill to implement a 20-week nationwide abortion ban. In 2024, during her gubernatorial campaign, she reversed that position, saying she opposed federal restrictions on abortion. Ayotte said she supported access to in vitro fertilization (IVF) treatment. This shift to a more pro-abortion stance was praised, but Planned Parenthood criticized Ayotte for opposing its state funding.

In the Senate, Ayotte offered legislation to make birth control available over-the-counter without a prescription, which she argued would increase access and allow flexible spending accounts and health savings accounts to be used to purchase it. She voted to shift federal funding from Planned Parenthood to other community health centers that also serve low- and middle-income women and families, but opposed an attempt to shut down the federal government over the issue. For 2016, Ayotte was given a 100% rating by National Right to Life and an 82% by the pro-life Campaign for Working Families.

For 2016, NARAL Pro-Choice America gave Ayotte a 15% rating and pro-choice Planned Parenthood gave her a 6% rating. Also in 2016, Ayotte's Senate reelection campaign was criticized for giving away free condoms at the University of New Hampshire.

==== Same-sex marriage and LGBT rights ====
Ayotte's views on same-sex marriage as well as adoption by same-sex couples have evolved with time. As New Hampshire's attorney general, she opposed requiring employers to provide benefits to same-sex couples, and sought to appeal a court ruling on the issue; the appeal was dropped after New Hampshire legalized civil unions.

In 2010, Ayotte said of same-sex marriage: "Ultimately I do think this is a matter for the states and states should decide how to define marriage. New Hampshire's already made that decision and I respect the decision." In 2015, she was one of 11 U.S. Senate Republicans who voted to extend Social Security and veterans' benefits to all same-sex married couples. The Human Rights Campaign, which supports same-sex marriage and other gay rights, gave Ayotte an 80% rating.

Running for governor in 2024, Ayotte said she opposes laws that keep a student's gender identity confidential and supports laws requiring schools to inform parents about a student's gender identity at school. But Ayotte vetoed two anti-LGBT bills in 2025, one that would have banned books with LGBT themes and one that would have created bathroom restrictions. She said she believes "there are important and legitimate privacy and safety concerns raised by biological males using places such as female locker rooms and being placed in female correctional facilities" but that "At the same time, I see that House Bill 148 is overly broad and impractical to enforce, potentially creating an exclusionary environment for some of our citizens".

==== Violence Against Women Act ====
Ayotte voted to reauthorize the Violence Against Women Act in 2012. In 2014, she and Claire McCaskill led passage of a bill to reform the way the military handles sexual assaults, increase prosecutions, and improve support for survivors. In 2015, she and Kirsten Gillibrand introduced the Campus Accountability and Safety Act to combat sexual assault on college campuses and better support survivors.

==== Gun policy ====
Ayotte supported the U.S. Supreme Court's decisions in McDonald v. City of Chicago and District of Columbia v. Heller, which invalidated strict gun laws in Chicago and Washington. In 2006, she opposed a Republican-backed bill to establish a castle doctrine for New Hampshire.

In 2013, Ayotte opposed legislation offered by Joe Manchin and Pat Toomey to mandate background checks for all commercial gun sales. As part of the debate over Manchin-Toomey, Ayotte voted for an amendment that would have increased access to mental health records for background checks and provided funding to prosecute background check violations. The amendment did not pass.

In June 2016, Ayotte voted against an amendment offered by Chris Murphy that would have required background checks for gun sales at gun shows, over the internet, and between friends and family. She voted for an amendment to increase funding for the background check system and enhance the definition of "mental competency" for purchasing firearms. She also voted for two amendments to block or delay the sale of firearms to known or suspected terrorists. All four amendments failed.

In the Senate, Ayotte supported proposed compromises on contentious gun legislation. She was part of a bipartisan group of eight senators who supported compromise legislation to close the "No Fly, No Buy" loophole and ensure people on the No Fly list could not purchase firearms.

=== Foreign policy ===
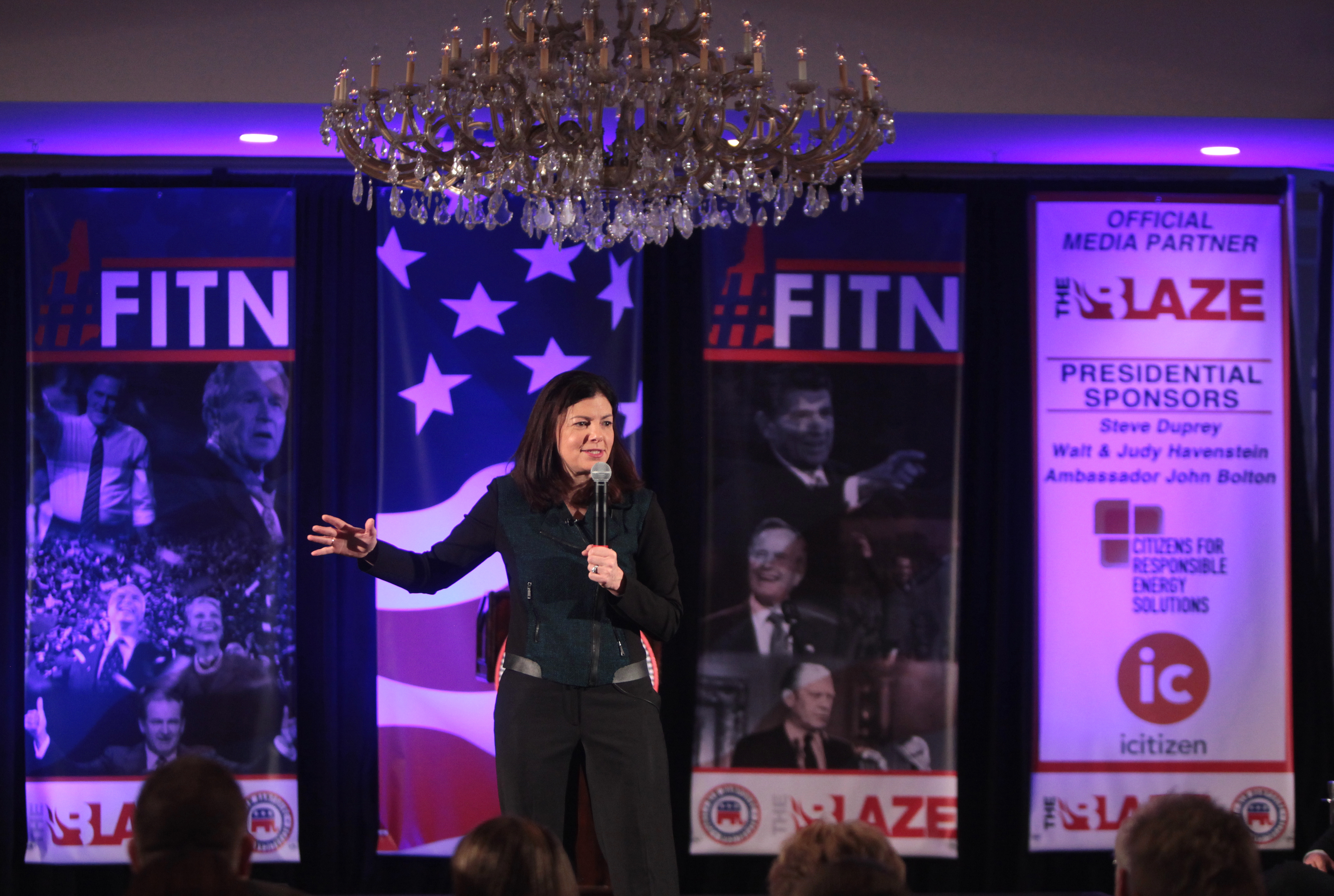
Senator Ayotte speaking at the 2016 FITN (First in the Nation) Town Hall hosted by the New Hampshire Republican Party

Ayotte chaired the Senate Armed Services Readiness Subcommittee and was a leading voice in the hawkish wing of the Senate Republican Conference. She opposed the Iran nuclear deal and called for strict new sanctions on Iran. Ayotte also backed new sanctions on North Korea in the wake of purported nuclear tests and called for a tougher stance on Russia.

==== Israeli–Palestinian conflict ====
In October 2014, Ayotte wrote an op-ed in The Hill criticizing Mahmoud Abbas, writing that the Palestinian Authority president "has embarked on a destructive course harmful to the prospects for rebuilding Gaza and achieving Israeli–Palestinian peace."

==== Defense spending ====
In October 2011, Ayotte cosponsored a bill with John McCain to control costs associated with major defense acquisition programs. She opposed the Defense Department's wish to retire the U.S.'s fleet of Cold War-era A-10 Thunderbolt II jets and redirect those funds elsewhere, arguing that there was no adequate replacement for the plane and citing her husband's experiences flying the A-10 while in the Air Force.

==== Iraq, Syria, and ISIS ====
Ayotte criticized President Obama for withdrawing U.S. troops from Iraq in 2011.

In July 2016, Ayotte released a comprehensive plan to defeat ISIS, including a "more aggressive" campaign of U.S. airstrikes against ISIS in Iraq and Syria.

==== Guantanamo Bay prisoners ====
Ayotte fought attempts by the Obama administration to try terrorism suspects in civilian federal courts. She opposed the closure of the Guantanamo Bay detention camp and introduced a bill in the Senate that would block its closure and ban any transfer of detainees to the United States.

Ayotte criticized the August 2015 transfer of 15 prisoners from the Guantanamo Bay detention camp to the United Arab Emirates (UAE), saying she believed the released prisoners had dangerous ties to terrorism and would resume terrorist activity. She said that the Pentagon told her in 2015 that 93 percent of the detainees in Guantanamo Bay were considered "high risk" for returning to terrorist activities.

Ayotte authored and released an unclassified report that summarized information about the 107 original detainees at Guantanamo Bay, including the detainees' affiliations and terrorist activities before their detention. She pushed for the Pentagon to publicly disclose more details about the detainees; the Pentagon currently releases only detainees' names and countries where they are transferred.

== Personal life ==
In 2001, Ayotte married Joseph Daley, an Iraq War veteran and former A-10 pilot who flew combat missions in Iraq. Daley is retired from the Air National Guard and owns a small landscaping and snowplow business in Merrimack. She and Daley have two children.

Ayotte is a practicing Catholic.

== Electoral history ==
2024 New Hampshire gubernatorial election
| Party | Candidate | Votes | % |
|---|---|---|---|
| Republican | Kelly Ayotte | 435,400 | 53.6 |
| Democratic | Joyce Craig | 360,068 | 44.3 |
| Libertarian | Stephen Villee | 16,919 | 2.1 |
| Total votes | | 812,387 | 100.0 |

2016 United States Senate election in New Hampshire
| Party | Candidate | Votes | % |
|---|---|---|---|
| Democratic | Maggie Hassan | 354,268 | 48.2 |
| Republican | Kelly Ayotte (incumbent) | 353,525 | 48.1 |
| Independent | Aaron Day | 17,702 | 2.0 |
| Libertarian | Brian Chabot | 12,988 | 1.7 |
| Total votes | | 738,483 | 100.0 |

2010 United States Senate election in New Hampshire
| Party | Candidate | Votes | % |
|---|---|---|---|
| Republican | Kelly Ayotte | 273,210 | 60.09 |
| Democratic | Paul Hodes | 167,545 | 36.85 |
| Independent | Chris Booth | 9,194 | 2.02 |
| Libertarian | Ken Blevens | 4,753 | 1.05 |
| Total votes | | 454,702 | 100.0 |

2010 Republican Primary for U.S. Senate New Hampshire
| Party | Candidate | Votes | % |
|---|---|---|---|
| Republican | Kelly Ayotte | 53,056 | 38.21 |
| Republican | Ovide Lamontagne | 51,397 | 37.01 |
| Republican | Bill Binnie | 19,508 | 14.05 |
| Republican | Jim Bender | 12,611 | 9.08 |
| Republican | Dennis Lamare | 1,388 | 1.00 |
| Republican | Tom Alciere | 499 | 0.36 |
| Republican | Gerard Beloin | 402 | 0.29 |
| Total votes | | 138,861 | 100.0 |

== See also ==
- List of female governors in the United States
- List of female state attorneys general in the United States
- Women in the United States Senate

Legal offices
| Preceded by Peter Heed | Attorney General of New Hampshire; 2004–2009 | Succeeded by Mike Delaney |
Party political offices
| Preceded by Judd Gregg | Republican nominee for U.S. Senator from New Hampshire (Class 3); 2010, 2016 | Succeeded by Don Bolduc |
| Preceded by Chris Sununu | Republican nominee for Governor of New Hampshire; 2024, 2026 | Most recent |
U.S. Senate
| Preceded by Judd Gregg | United States Senator (Class 3) from New Hampshire; 2011–2017; Served alongside: Jeanne Shaheen | Succeeded by Maggie Hassan |
Political offices
| Preceded by Chris Sununu | Governor of New Hampshire; 2025–present | Incumbent |
U.S. order of precedence (ceremonial)
| Preceded by JD Vance as Vice President | Order of precedence of the United States; Within New Hampshire | Succeeded by Mayor of city in which event is held |
| Preceded by JD Vance as Vice President | Order of precedence of the United States; Within New Hampshire | Succeeded by Otherwise Mike Johnson as Speaker of the House |
| Preceded by Henry McMaster as Governor of South Carolina | Order of precedence of the United States; Outside New Hampshire | Succeeded by Abigail Spanberger as Governor of Virginia |
