= List of New Hampshire state agencies =

The following is a list of New Hampshire state agencies—government agencies of the U.S. state of New Hampshire. Entries are listed alphabetically per their first distinguishing word (e.g. the New Hampshire Department of Agriculture, Markets, and Food is listed under "A" for Agriculture), with subordinate agencies listed under their parent agency.

== A ==
- New Hampshire Department of Administrative Services
- New Hampshire Commission on Aging
- New Hampshire Department of Agriculture, Markets, and Food

== B ==
- New Hampshire Banking Department
- New Hampshire Boxing and Wrestling Commission
- New Hampshire Department of Business and Economic Affairs
  - New Hampshire Division of Economic Development
  - New Hampshire Division of Travel and Tourism Development
- New Hampshire Business Finance Authority

== C ==
- Community College System of New Hampshire
  - Great Bay Community College (Portsmouth, Rochester)
  - Lakes Region Community College (Laconia)
  - Manchester Community College
  - Nashua Community College
  - NHTI – Concord's Community College
  - River Valley Community College (Claremont, Keene)
  - White Mountains Community College (Berlin, Littleton, Woodsville)
- New Hampshire Community Development Finance Authority
- New Hampshire Department of Corrections

== E ==
- New Hampshire Department of Education
  - New Hampshire State Board of Education
  - New Hampshire Higher Education Commission
  - New Hampshire Council for Teacher Education
- New Hampshire Employment Security
  - New Hampshire Economic and Labor Market Information Bureau
- New Hampshire Department of Environmental Services
  - New Hampshire Geological Survey
  - New Hampshire Pollution Prevention Program
  - New Hampshire Water Council
  - New Hampshire Wetlands Council
- Executive Council of New Hampshire

== F ==
- New Hampshire Film and Television Office
- New Hampshire Fish and Game Department

== G ==
- Governor of New Hampshire
  - New Hampshire Governor’s Commission on Alcohol and other Drugs
  - New Hampshire Governor’s Commission on Cryptocurrencies and Digital Assets
  - New Hampshire Governor's Commission on Disability
  - New Hampshire Governor's Commission on the Humane Treatment of Animals

== H ==
- New Hampshire Department of Health & Human Services
- New Hampshire Housing Finance Authority
- New Hampshire Commission for Human Rights

== I ==
- New Hampshire Office of Information Technology
- New Hampshire Insurance Department

== J ==
- New Hampshire Department of Justice
  - Attorney General of New Hampshire

== L ==
- New Hampshire Department of Labor
- New Hampshire Liquor Commission
- New Hampshire Lottery Commission
  - New Hampshire Gaming Regulatory Oversight Authority

== M ==
- New Hampshire Department of Military Affairs and Veterans Services
  - Adjutant General of New Hampshire
  - New Hampshire State Veterans Council
  - New Hampshire Veterans Cemetery
  - New Hampshire Veterans Home

== N ==
- New Hampshire National Guard
  - New Hampshire Air National Guard
  - New Hampshire Army National Guard
- New Hampshire Department of Natural and Cultural Resources
  - New Hampshire Division of Historical Resources
  - New Hampshire Division of Forests and Lands
  - New Hampshire Division of Parks and Recreation
  - New Hampshire State Council on the Arts
  - New Hampshire State Library
- New Hampshire Port Authority

== P ==
- Pease Development Authority
  - Pease International Tradeport
  - Pease Development Authority Division of Ports and Harbors
- New Hampshire Police Standards and Training Council
- New Hampshire Office of Professional Licensure and Certification

Health Profession Boards

  - New Hampshire Office of Licensed Allied Health Professionals
  - New Hampshire Board of Barbering, Cosmetology, and Esthetics
  - New Hampshire Board of Dental Examiners
  - New Hampshire Board of Registration of Funeral Directors and Embalmers
  - New Hampshire State Board of Medicine
  - New Hampshire Board of Mental Health Practice
  - New Hampshire Board of Nursing
  - New Hampshire Board of Registration in Optometry
  - New Hampshire Board of Pharmacy
  - New Hampshire Board of Registration in Podiatry
  - New Hampshire Board of Veterinary Medicine

Technical Profession Boards

- New Hampshire Board of Accountancy
- New Hampshire Family Mediator Certification Board
- New Hampshire Guardian ad Litem Board
- New Hampshire Board of Manufactured Housing
- New Hampshire Mechanical Safety and Licensing Board
- New Hampshire Real Estate Appraiser Board

- New Hampshire Public Employee Labor Relations Board
- New Hampshire Public Utilities Commission

== R ==
- New Hampshire Real Estate Commission
- New Hampshire Retirement System
- New Hampshire Department of Revenue Administration

== S ==
- New Hampshire Department of Safety
  - New Hampshire Building Code Review Board
  - New Hampshire Bureau of Hearings
  - New Hampshire Office of Highway Safety
  - New Hampshire Motor Vehicle Industry Board
  - New Hampshire Road Toll Bureau
  - New Hampshire Bureau of Marine Patrol
  - New Hampshire State Police
    - D.A.R.E. New Hampshire
- New Hampshire Department of State
  - New Hampshire Secretary of State
  - New Hampshire Board of Auctioneers
- New Hampshire Office of Strategic Initiatives
  - New Hampshire Floodplain Management Program
  - New Hampshire Fuel Assistance Program
  - New Hampshire State Data Center
  - New Hampshire Weatherization Assistance Program

== T ==
- New Hampshire Board of Tax and Land Appeals
- New Hampshire Department of Transportation
- New Hampshire State Treasury
  - New Hampshire Abandoned Property Division
