= National Space Grant College and Fellowship Program =

American institutions of space research

The space-grant colleges are educational institutions in the United States that comprise a network of fifty-three consortia established in 1988 for the purpose of outer space-related research. Each consortium is based in one of the fifty states, the District of Columbia, Puerto Rico, and Guam. Each consists of multiple independent space-grant institutions, with one of the institutions acting as lead.

Similar programs include sea-grant colleges (instituted in 1966) and sun-grant colleges (instituted in 2003).

== Objectives ==
The program states the following objectives:

- Establish and maintain a national network of universities with interests and capabilities in aeronautics, outer space, and related fields;
- Encourage cooperative programs among universities, the aerospace industry, and federal, state, and local governments;
- Encourage interdisciplinary training, research, and public service programs related to aerospace;
- Recruit and train U.S. citizens, especially women, underrepresented minorities, and persons with disabilities, for careers in aerospace science and technology; and,
- Promote a strong science, mathematics, and technology education base from elementary through secondary levels.

== History ==
The National Space Grant College and Fellowship Program was established in 1988 by the United States Congress following the success of similar scholarship opportunities in the oceanic Sea Grant and agricultural Land Grant fields. The catch-all term Space Grant refers back to these previous federal programs. In 1989, the program was given over to NASA, which administers it in the same way that NOAA administers Sea Grant.

The first meeting of the National Council of Space Grant Directors took place from January 16 to January 19, 1990, at the Johns Hopkins Applied Physics Laboratory in Columbia, Maryland, and the Jet Propulsion Laboratory in La Cañada Flintridge, California. In 2011, an effort was made to begin collecting the history of the council.

== Programs ==
=== Building Leaders for Advancing Science and Technology (BLAST) ===
BLAST is a three-day summer event that takes place at Virginia's Old Dominion University. This free, STEM-centered event, is available to 8th and 9th graders with a 2.3 GPA or better. BLAST's purpose is to show the students the interesting aspects of STEM to those who are unsure whether they want to be involved in STEM or not.

=== Nationwide Eclipse Ballooning Project ===
The NEBP is a high-altitude, balloon launching program.

=== eXploration Systems and Habitation (X-Hab) 2019 Academic Innovation Challenge ===
The eXploration Systems and Habitation (X-Hab) challenge seeks better the academic and technological abilities of university students. It utilizes hands-on training in the implementation of space habitats for deep space missions. There is an Advanced Exploration Systems (AES) Division where university students can compete to win awards worth $15,000–50,000 for a functional design that the AES finds useful and, or, interesting.

=== John Mather Nobel Scholars ===
Established in 2008, the John Mather Nobel Scholars is a scholarship program open to NASA-Goddard Space Flight. The program provides $3,000 so that a chosen participant can share their research paper with NASA professionals. To be a part of this program, a GPA of 3.5 or higher is necessary along with being a junior or higher.

=== NASA KSC Higher Education Support Services ===
The NASA/Kennedy Space Center Higher Education Support Services supports college grade Higher Education competitions. Such competitions entail internships, senior design projects, and selective grants.

=== National Space Grant Distinguished Service Award ===
The National Space Grant Distinguished Service Award was created by Josh Simpson and is awarded to students who will have an impact in a STEM field related to NASA's mission/goals.

=== Space Grant Support Services ===
The goal of the Space Grant Support Services is to better the Space Grant network. The Space Grant Support Services supports the Space Grant network in many different ways from an economical view to a public view.

=== Space Systems Engineering Website ===
The Space Systems Engineering Website is a free, six-week, online course that allows students to work and learn with NASA's engineers. Course materials will always be accessible and students are able to use the learned resources in any way they please.

=== Virginia Aerospace Science and Technology Program ===
The Virginia Aerospace Science and Technology Program is a one-week, online, STEM summer program. The program focuses on NASA-related research provided by NASA's STEM professionals.

=== Virginia Commonwealth STEM Industry Internship Program (CSIIP) ===
The Virginia Commonwealth STEM Industry Internship Program or CSIIP, provides an online internship application system for STEM majors. This was done for the people to meet the increasing demand for citizens with STEM majors.

=== Virginia Earth System Science Scholars ===
The Virginia Earth System Science Scholars is a STEM-centered program where participants participate with NASA's professional researchers. The Virginia Space Coast Scholars (VSCS) program is an online, week long, STEM-centered program that focuses on the study of NASA's missions.

=== William A Hiscock Space Grant Scholarship Fund ===
The William A Hiscock Space Grant Scholarship Fund was created "in memory of William Hiscock, the former director of the Montana Space Grant." Due to his efforts, many NASA ballooning centered programs were created.

== Participating institutions ==
As of 2002, there are over 850 participating institutions.

=== Alabama Space Grant Consortium ===
- University of Alabama in Huntsville, lead institution
- Auburn University
- University of Alabama
- University of Alabama at Birmingham
- University of North Alabama
- University of South Alabama
- Alabama A&M University
- Tuskegee University

=== Alaska Space Grant Consortium ===
- University of Alaska Fairbanks, lead institution
- Alaska Pacific University
- University of Alaska Anchorage
- University of Alaska Southeast

=== Arizona Space Grant Consortium ===
- University of Arizona, lead institution
- Arizona State University
- Northern Arizona University
- Embry-Riddle Aeronautical University
- USGS Flagstaff Branch
- World View Enterprises
- Arizona Daily Star
- Arizona Daily Sun
- Arizona Near Space Research
- Biosphere 2
- Central Arizona College
- Coconino Community College
- Diné College
- Estrella Mountain Community College
- Flandrau Science Center and Planetarium
- Glendale Community College
- Iridium Satellite Communications
- Lowell Observatory
- Mt. Lemmon SkyCenter and Sky School
- National Optical Astronomy Observatory (NOAO)
- National Undergraduate Research Observatory (NURO)
- Northern Arizona Planetary Science Alliance (NAPSA)
- Northrop Grumman
- Paragon Space Development Corporation
- Phoenix College
- Pima Community College
- Planetary Science Institute
- Prescott Astronomy Club
- Raytheon Corporation
- Rincon Research
- Tohono O'odham Community College
- USDA ARS Southwest Watershed Research Center

=== Arkansas Space Grant Consortium ===
- University of Arkansas at Little Rock, lead institution
- Arkansas State University, Jonesboro
- Arkansas Tech University, Russellville
- Harding University, Searcy
- Henderson State University, Arkadelphia
- Hendrix College, Conway
- John Brown University
- Lyon College, Batesville
- Ouachita Baptist University, Arkadelphia
- Southern Arkansas University, Magnolia
- University of Arkansas, Fayetteville
- University of Arkansas at Fort Smith
- University of Arkansas for Medical Sciences
- University of Arkansas at Monticello
- University of Arkansas at Pine Bluff
- University of Central Arkansas
- University of the Ozarks
- Arkansas Aerospace Training Consortium
- Arkansas Aviation Historical Society
- Arkansas Department of Aeronautics
- Arkansas Economic Development Commission
- Arkansas Department of Education
- Arkansas Department of Higher Education
- BEI Precision
- Civil Air Patrol, Arkansas Wing
- Conestoga-Rovers & Associates

=== California Space Grant Consortium ===
- Astronomical Society of the Pacific
- Azusa Pacific University
- California State Polytechnic University, Pomona
- California Polytechnic State University
- California Institute of Technology
- California State University, Sacramento
- California State University, San Bernardino
- California State University, Long Beach
- California State University, Los Angeles
- Pomona College
- San Diego State University
- San Jose State University
- Santa Clara University
- Sonoma State University
- Stanford University
- University of California, Berkeley
- University of California, Davis
- University of California, Irvine
- University of California, Los Angeles
- University of California, Riverside
- University of California, San Diego, lead institution
- University of California, Santa Barbara
- University of California, Santa Cruz
- University of San Diego
- University of Southern California

=== Colorado Space Grant Consortium ===
- University of Colorado Boulder, lead institution
- Adams State University
- Aims Community College
- Colorado Mesa University
- Colorado School of Mines
- Colorado State University
- Colorado State University - Pueblo
- University of Denver
- Community College of Aurora
- Community College of Denver
- Fort Lewis College
- Front Range Community College
- Otero College
- Metropolitan State University of Denver
- Pikes Peak State College
- Pueblo Community College
- Red Rocks Community College
- Space Foundation
- Trinidad State College
- University of Colorado at Colorado Springs
- University of Northern Colorado
- Western State Colorado University

=== Connecticut Space Grant Consortium ===
- University of Hartford, lead institution*University of New Haven co- lead institution
- Asnuntuck Community College
- Capital Community College
- Gateway Community College
- Housatonic Community College
- Manchester Community College
- Middlesex Community College
- Naugatuck Valley Community College
- Northwestern Connecticut Community College
- Norwalk Community College
- Quinebaug Valley Community College
- Three Rivers Community College
- Tunxis Community College
- Central Connecticut State University
- Eastern Connecticut State University
- Fairfield University
- Southern Connecticut State University
- Trinity College
- University of Bridgeport
- University of Connecticut
- Wesleyan University
- Yale University
- Connecticut Invention Convention
- New England Air Museum
- Connecticut Science Center
- Discovery Museum

=== Delaware Space Grant Consortium ===
- University of Delaware, lead institution
- Delaware Technical Community College - Jack F. Owens Campus
- Delaware Technical Community College - Stanton Campus
- Delaware Technical Community College - Terry Campus
- Delaware Technical Community College - George Campus
- Wesley College
- Wilmington University

=== Florida Space Grant Consortium ===
- Astronauts Memorial Foundation
- Bethune-Cookman University
- Broward College
- Eastern Florida State College
- Eckerd College
- Embry–Riddle Aeronautical University
- Florida A&M University
- Florida Atlantic University
- Florida Gulf Coast University
- Florida Institute of Technology
- Florida International University
- Florida Polytechnic University
- Florida State University
- Kennedy Space Center
- Orlando Science Center
- Space Florida
- University of Central Florida, lead institution
- University of Florida
- University of Miami
- University of North Florida
- University of South Florida
- University of West Florida

=== Georgia Space Grant Consortium ===
- Georgia Institute of Technology, lead institution
- Albany State University
- Agnes Scott College
- Clark Atlanta University
- Columbus State University
- Fort Valley State University
- Georgia Southern University
- Georgia Southern University - Armstrong Campus
- Georgia State University
- Kennesaw State University
- Mercer University
- Morehouse College
- Museum of Aviation
- Savannah State University
- SpaceWorks Enterprises, Inc.
- Spelman College
- University of Georgia
- University of Georgia - Griffin Campus
- University of North Georgia
- University of West Georgia

=== Hawai'i Space Grant Consortium ===
- University of Hawaiʻi at Mānoa, lead institution
- University of Hawaiʻi at Hilo
- Hawaiʻi Community College
- Honolulu Community College
- Kapiʻolani Community College
- Kauaʻi Community College
- Leeward Community College
- University of Hawaiʻi Maui College
- Windward Community College
- University of Guam

=== Idaho Space Grant Consortium ===
- University of Idaho, lead institution
- Boise State University
- Brigham Young University - Idaho
- Bruneau Dunes State Park
- College of Southern Idaho
- College of Western Idaho
- Craters of the Moon National Monument
- Discovery Center of Idaho
- Eastern Idaho Engineering Council
- Idaho Academy of Science and Engineering
- Idaho Department of Education
- Idaho Museum of Natural History
- Idaho National Laboratory
- Idaho Out-of-School Network
- Idaho Science Teachers Association
- Idaho State University
- Idaho STEM Action Center
- Idaho Transportation Department - Division of Aeronautics
- Lewis-Clark State College
- North Idaho College
- Northwest Nazarene University
- Palouse Discovery Center
- The College of Idaho

=== Illinois Space Grant Consortium ===
- University of Illinois Urbana–Champaign, lead institution
- Adler Planetarium
- Bradley University
- Chicago State University
- City Colleges of Chicago
- DePaul University
- Discovery Center Museum
- Illinois Institute of Technology
- Northern Illinois University
- Northwestern University
- Southern Illinois University Carbondale
- University of Chicago
- University of Illinois Chicago

=== Indiana Space Grant Consortium ===
- Purdue University, lead Institution
- Ball State University
- Anderson University
- Challenger Learning Center
- Children's Museum Indianapolis
- Conner Prairie
- Evansville Museum
- Ethos Science Center
- Indiana University
- Indiana State Museum
- Indiana State University
- Indiana University Bloomington
- Indiana University–Purdue University Columbus
- Indiana University–Purdue University Indianapolis
- NearSpace Launch Inc.
- Purdue University Fort Wayne
- Purdue University Northwest
- Science Central
- StratoStar Project Based STEM Learning
- Taylor University
- Terre Haute Children's Museum
- Trine University
- University of Evansville
- University of Southern Indiana
- Valparaiso University

=== Iowa Space Grant Consortium ===
- Iowa State University, lead institution
- Aerodyne Labs
- Ames Laboratory
- Collins Aerospace
- Des Moines Area Community College
- Grout Museum District
- Iowa Academy of Science
- Iowa Aviation Promotion Group, Inc.
- Iowa Department of Education
- Iowa DOT - Aviation Bureau
- ISU Extension and Outreach 4-H Youth Development
- Loras College
- National Lab for Agriculture and the Environment
- National Mississippi River Museum and Aquarium
- Putnam Museum
- Science Center of Iowa
- Softronics, Ltd.
- University of Iowa
- University of Northern Iowa
- Drake University

=== Kansas Space Grant Consortium ===
- Wichita State University, lead institution
- Emporia State University
- Fort Hays State University
- Haskell Indian Nations University
- Kansas Cosmosphere and Space Center
- Kansas State University
- Pittsburg State University
- University of Kansas

=== Kentucky Space Grant Consortium ===
- University of Kentucky College of Engineering, lead institution
- Asbury University
- Ashland Community and Technical College
- Aviation Museum of Kentucky
- Bellarmine University
- Berea College
- Bluegrass Community and Technical College
- Centre College
- Eastern Kentucky University
- Faradine Systems
- Global Parametrics
- Hopkinsville Community College
- Innoviator, LLC
- Kentucky Science & Technology Corp
- Kentucky Science Center
- Kentucky State University
- The Living Arts and Science Center
- Morehead State University
- Murray State University
- Northern Kentucky University
- Owensboro Community and Technical College
- Space Tango
- Thomas More University
- Tribo Flow Separations, LLC
- University of Louisville
- University of Pikeville
- West Kentucky Community and Technical
- Western Kentucky University

=== Louisiana Space Grant Consortium ===
- Louisiana State University, lead institution
- Baton Rouge Community College
- BREC/Highland Road Park Observatory
- Delgado Community College
- Dillard University
- Gordon A. Cain Center for STEM Literacy
- Grambling State University and A & M College
- Louisiana Business Technology Center
- Louisiana Board of Elementary and Secondary Education
- Louisiana Board of Regents
- Louisiana Public Broadcasting
- Louisiana State University - Alexandria
- Louisiana State University Agricultural Center
- Louisiana State University Health Sciences Center at Shreveport
- Louisiana State University in Shreveport
- Louisiana Tech University
- Loyola University
- McNeese State University
- Nicholls State University
- Northshore Technical Community College
- Northwestern State University of Louisiana
- Nunez Community College
- River Parishes Community College
- SciPort Discovery Center
- Southeastern Louisiana University
- Southern University and A & M College
- Southern University at New Orleans
- Tulane University
- University of Louisiana at Lafayette
- University of Louisiana at Monroe
- University of New Orleans
- Xavier University of Louisiana

=== Maine Space Grant Consortium ===
- Maine Space Grant Consortium, lead institution
- University of Maine
- Bates College
- Bigelow Laboratory for Ocean Sciences
- BluShift Aerospace
- Bowdoin College
- Challenger Learning Center of Maine
- Colby College
- Island Institute
- Fryeburg Academy
- Gulf of Maine Research Institute
- Lockheed Martin
- Maine Department of Education
- Maine Manufacturing Extension Partnership
- Maine Maritime Academy
- Maine Mathematics and Science Alliance
- Maine School of Science and Mathematics
- Northern Maine Museum of Science
- Saint Joseph's College of Maine
- Southern Maine Community College
- University of New England
- University of Southern Maine
- VALT Enterprises, LLC
- York County Community College

=== Maryland Space Grant Consortium ===
- Johns Hopkins University, lead institution
- Capitol Technology University
- Hagerstown Community College
- The Johns Hopkins University Applied Physics Laboratory
- Morgan State University
- National Center for Earth & Space Science Education
- The Space Telescope Science Institute
- Towson University
- United States Naval Academy
- University of Maryland, Baltimore County
- University of Maryland, College Park
- University of Maryland Eastern Shore

=== Massachusetts Space Grant Consortium ===
- Massachusetts Institute of Technology, lead institution
- Boston Museum of Science
- Boston University
- Bridgewater State University
- Five College Astronomy Department
- Framingham State University
- Franklin W. Olin College of Engineering
- Harvard University
- Maria Mitchell Observatory
- Christa McAuliffe Center for Integrated Science Learning
- Mount Holyoke College
- Northeastern University
- Roxbury Community College
- Tufts University
- University of Massachusetts
- University of Massachusetts Dartmouth
- University of Massachusetts Lowell
- Wellesley College
- Williams College
- Worcester Polytechnic Institute
- Worcester State University

=== Michigan Space Grant Consortium ===
- University of Michigan, lead institution
- Calvin University
- Eastern Michigan University
- Grand Valley State University
- Hope College
- Michigan State University
- Michigan Technological University
- Oakland University
- Saginaw Valley State University
- Wayne State University
- Western Michigan University
- Ann Arbor Public Schools

=== Minnesota Space Grant Consortium ===
- University of Minnesota, lead institution
- Augsburg University
- Bemidji State University
- Bethel University
- Carleton College
- Concordia College
- Fond du Lac Tribal and Community College
- Leech Lake Tribal College
- Macalester College
- Minnesota Dept. of Transportation – Office of Aeronautics
- St. Catherine University
- Southwest Minnesota State University
- University of Minnesota – Duluth
- University of St. Thomas

=== Mississippi Space Grant Consortium ===
- University of Mississippi, lead institution
- Alcorn State University
- Coahoma Community College
- Delta State University
- Hinds Community College
- Itawamba Community College
- Jackson State University
- Jones County Junior College
- Mississippi State University
- Meridian Community College
- Mississippi Delta Community College
- Mississippi Gulf Coast Community College
- Northeast Mississippi Community College
- Mississippi University for Women
- Mississippi Valley State University
- University of Southern Mississippi
- Pearl River Community College

=== Missouri Space Grant Consortium ===
- Missouri University of Science and Technology, lead institution
- Challenger Learning Center of St. Louis
- Lincoln University
- Missouri State University
- St Louis University
- Truman State University
- University of Missouri
- University of Missouri–Kansas City
- University of Missouri–St. Louis
- Washington University in St. Louis

=== Montana Space Grant Consortium ===
- Aaniiih Nakoda College
- Anasphere, Inc.
- Blackfeet Community College
- Carroll College
- Chief Dull Knife College
- Montana Science Center
- Dawson Community College
- Flathead Valley Community College
- Fort Peck Community College
- Gallatin College
- Great Falls College MSU
- Helena College - UM
- HOPA Mountain, Inc.
- Little Big Horn College
- Miles Community College
- Missoula College
- Montana 4-H Foundation
- Montana Learning Center
- Montana State University Billings
- Montana State University Bozeman, lead institution
- Montana State University Northern
- Montana Tech of the University of Montana
- Museum of the Rockies
- Rocky Mountain College
- Salish Kootenai College
- Stone Child College
- University of Providence
- University of Montana - Missoula
- University of Montana - Western

=== Nebraska Space Grant Consortium ===
- University of Nebraska Omaha, lead institution
- CALMIT
- Chadron State College
- Civil Air Patrol - 99th Pursuit Squadron
- College of Saint Mary
- Creighton University
- Great Plains Girl Scouts
- Hastings College
- Metropolitan Community College
- Nebraska Academy of Sciences
- Nebraska Aviation Council
- Nebraska Department of Aeronautics
- Nebraska Department of Education
- Nebraska 4-H
- Nebraska Indian Community College
- University of Nebraska at Kearney
- University of Nebraska-Lincoln
- University of Nebraska Medical Center
- Western Nebraska Community College

=== Nevada Space Grant Consortium ===
- Desert Research Institute, lead institution
- DRI - Sciencealive
- Abaris Training Resources
- Challenger Learning Center of Northern Nevada
- College of Southern Nevada
- Digital Solid State Propulsion
- Fleischmann Planetarium & Science Center
- Great Basin College
- Jack C. Davis Observatory
- Nevada State College
- The Planetarium at CSN
- Sustainable Grounding Systems
- Truckee Meadows Community College
- University of Nevada - Las Vegas
- University of Nevada - Reno
- University and Community College System of Nevada
- Western Nevada College

=== New Hampshire Space Grant Consortium ===
- University of New Hampshire, lead institution
- BAE Systems
- Great Bay Community College - Portsmouth
- Great Bay Community College - Rochester
- Dartmouth College
- Lakes Region Community College - Laconia
- Manchester Community College
- McAuliffe-Shepard Discovery Center
- Mount Washington Observatory
- Nashua Community College
- NHTI, Concord's Community College
- Plymouth State University
- River Valley Community College - Lebanon
- River Valley Community College - Claremont
- River Valley Community College - Keene
- White Mountains Community College

=== New Jersey Space Grant Consortium ===
- Rutgers University–New Brunswick, lead institution
- Bloomfield College
- Brookdale Community College
- The College of New Jersey
- Essex County College
- Federal Aviation Administration, William J. Hughes Technical Center
- Georgian Court University
- Goddard Institute for Space Studies
- Liberty Science Center
- Middlesex County College
- Montclair State University
- New Jersey City University
- New Jersey Institute of Technology
- Princeton University
- Princeton University Plasma Physics Laboratory
- Ramapo College
- Raritan Valley Community College
- Rowan University
- Rutgers University-Camden
- Rutgers University-Newark
- Seton Hall University
- Stevens Institute of Technology
- Stockton University
- Union County College
- William Paterson University

=== New Mexico Space Grant Consortium ===
- New Mexico State University, lead institution
- American Institute of Aeronautics and Astronautics
- Air Force Research Laboratory
- Arrowhead Center
- Blue Origin
- Boeing
- BRPH
- Center of Excellence for Commercial Space Transportation
- Central New Mexico Community College
- Colorado Air and Space Port
- Doña Ana Community College
- Federal Aviation Administration
- Fisher Space Pen
- Highlands University
- Jacobs
- Lockheed Martin
- New Mexico Institute of Mining and Technology
- Northrop Grumman
- Southwestern Indian Polytechnic Institute
- Space News
- Special Aerospace Services
- University of New Mexico
- Virgin Galactic

=== New York Space Grant Consortium ===
- Cornell University, lead institution
- Alfred University
- Barnard College
- Binghamton University
- City College of New York
- Clarkson University
- Colgate University
- Columbia University
- Cosmoptera, Inc.
- Intrepid Sea, Air & Space Museum
- Lockheed Martin
- Medgar Evers College
- Moog Inc.
- New York University Tandon School of Engineering
- Rensselaer Polytechnic Institute
- Rochester Institute of Technology
- Sciencenter
- SUNY Geneseo
- Stony Brook University
- Syracuse University
- Union College
- University at Buffalo
- University of Rochester
- Ursa Space Systems
- York College

=== North Carolina Space Grant Consortium ===
- North Carolina State University

=== North Dakota Space Grant Consortium ===
- University of North Dakota, lead institution
- Bismarck State College
- Cankdeska Cikana Community College
- Dakota College at Bottineau
- Dickinson State University
- Gateway To Science
- Lake Region State College
- Mayville State University
- Minot State University
- North Dakota State College of Science
- North Dakota State University
- Nueta Hidatsa Sahnish College
- Sitting Bull College
- State Historical Society of North Dakota
- Turtle Mountain College
- United Tribes Technical College
- Valley City State University
- Williston State College

=== Ohio Space Grant Consortium ===
- Ohio Northern University, lead institution
- Ohio Aerospace Institute
- Baldwin Wallace University
- Case Western Reserve University
- Cedarville University
- Central State University
- The Cincinnati Observatory
- Cincinnati State Technical and Community College
- Cleveland State University
- Columbus State Community College
- Cuyahoga Community College
- Drake Planetarium and Science Center
- iSpace
- Kent State University
- Lakeland Community College
- Lorain County Community College
- Marietta College
- Miami University
- NASA Glenn Research Center
- Ohio University
- Ohio State University
- Sinclair Community College
- University of Akron
- University of Toledo
- University of Cincinnati
- University of Dayton
- University of Toledo
- Wright State University
- Wilberforce University
- Youngstown State University

=== Oklahoma Space Grant Consortium ===
- Oklahoma State University–Stillwater, lead institution
- Cameron University
- Center for Spatial Analysis
- East Central University
- Frontier Electronic Systems Corp
- Langston University
- Norman Economic Development Center
- Redlands Community College
- Science Applications International Corp
- Southeastern Oklahoma State University
- Southern Nazarene University
- Southwestern Oklahoma State University
- Stafford Air and Space Museum
- STARBASE Oklahoma
- Tulsa Community College
- University of Oklahoma

=== Oregon Space Grant Consortium ===
- Oregon State University, lead institution
- Eastern Oregon University
- Evergreen Aviation & Space Museum
- George Fox University
- Lane Community College
- Linn Benton Community College
- The Museum at Warm Springs
- Oregon Coast Community College
- Oregon Institute of Technology
- Oregon Museum of Science and Industry
- Pacific University
- Portland Community College
- Portland State University
- Southern Oregon University
- Southwestern Oregon Community College
- University of Oregon
- University of Portland
- Western Oregon University

=== Pennsylvania Space Grant Consortium ===
- Pennsylvania State University, lead institution
- California University of Pennsylvania
- Carnegie Mellon University
- Cheyney University
- Drexel University
- Franklin & Marshall College
- Gannon University
- Gettysburg College
- Lehigh University
- Lincoln University
- Montgomery County Community College
- NASTAR Center
- Penn State Abington
- University of Pittsburgh
- Swarthmore College
- Temple University
- Villanova University
- West Chester University

=== Puerto Rico Space Grant Consortium ===
- University of Puerto Rico, lead institution
- Ana G. Méndez University System
- Arecibo Observatory
- EcoExploratorium
- Interamerican University of Puerto Rico at Bayamón
- Polytechnic University Puerto Rico
- Puerto Rico Astronomy Society
- Puerto Rico Department of Education
- Puerto Rico NASA Explorer School
- RUM Planetarium
- StarBase Puerto Rico

=== Rhode Island Space Grant Consortium ===
- Brown University, lead institution
- Bryant University
- Community College of Rhode Island
- Providence College
- Roger Williams Park Museum of Natural History and Planetarium
- Roger Williams University
- Rhode Island College
- Rhode Island School of Design
- Salve Regina University
- University of Rhode Island
- Wheaton College
- Rhode Island Aviation and Space Education Council
- NASA Educators Resource Center
- Northeast Planetary Data Center
- Ladd Observatory

=== South Carolina Space Grant Consortium ===
- College of Charleston

=== South Dakota Space Grant Consortium ===
- South Dakota School of Mines and Technology, lead institution
- Augustana University
- Badlands Observatory
- Black Hills Astronomical Society
- Black Hills State University
- Dakota State University
- The Journey Museum and Learning Center
- Lake Area Technical Institute
- Missouri Breaks Industries Research, Inc.
- Northern State University
- Oglala Lakota College
- Raven Industries
- RESPEC
- Sanford Underground Research Facility
- Sinte Gleska University
- South Dakota Air & Space Museum
- South Dakota Board of Regents
- South Dakota Discovery Center
- South Dakota State Library
- South Dakota State University
- University of South Dakota
- USGS Center for Earth Resources Observation and Science
- Washington Pavilion / Kirby Science Discovery Center

=== Tennessee Space Grant Consortium ===
- Vanderbilt University, lead institution
- Austin Peay State University
- East Tennessee State University
- Middle Tennessee State University
- Oak Ridge Associated Universities
- Rhodes College
- Tennessee Technological University
- University of Tennessee at Chattanooga

=== Texas Space Grant Consortium ===
Academic Members

- Angelo State University
- Austin Community College District
- Baylor University
- El Paso Community College
- Houston Community College
- Lamar University
- Laredo College
- Lone Star College System
- McLennan Community College
- Prairie View A&M University
- Rice University
- San Jacinto College
- South Texas College
- Southern Methodist University
- St. Edward's University
- Sul Ross State University
- Tarleton State University
- Texas A&M International University
- Texas A&M University
- Texas A&M University–Commerce
- Texas A&M University–Corpus Christi
- Texas A&M University–Kingsville
- Texas A&M University–Texarkana
- Texas Christian University
- Texas Southern University
- Texas State University
- Texas Tech University
- Texas Woman's University
- Trinity University (Texas)
- University of Dallas
- University of Houston
- University of Houston–Clear Lake
- University of Houston–Downtown
- University of North Texas
- University of St. Thomas (Texas)
- University of Texas Rio Grande Valley
- University of Texas at Arlington
- University of Texas at Austin, lead institution
- University of Texas at Dallas
- University of Texas at El Paso
- University of Texas at San Antonio
- University of Texas at Tyler
- University of Texas Health Science Center at Houston
- University of Texas Health Science Center at San Antonio
- University of Texas Medical Branch
- University of Texas Permian Basin
- University of Texas Southwestern Medical Center

Government Members

- Governor of Texas
- Texas Higher Education Coordinating Board

Industry Members

- Lockheed Martin

Non-Profit Members

- Austin Astronomical Society
- Austin Planetarium
- Bob Bullock Texas State History Museum
- Capitol Area Council, Boy Scouts of America
- Don Harrington Discovery Center
- Girlstart
- Rio Grande Valley Science Association
- Scobee Education Center
- Seal of Valor
- SEDS-USA
- Southwest Research Institute
- STEAMSPACE
- Texas Alliance for Minorities in Engineering
- Texas Medical Center
- Universities Space Research Association

=== Utah Space Grant Consortium ===
- University of Utah, lead institution
- Brigham Young University
- Utah State University

=== Vermont Space Grant Consortium ===
- University of Vermont, lead institution

=== Virginia Space Grant Consortium ===
- College of William & Mary
- Hampton University
- Old Dominion University
- University of Virginia
- Virginia Polytechnic Institute and State University

=== Washington D.C. NASA Space Grant Consortium ===
- American University

=== Washington NASA Space Grant Consortium ===
- University of Washington

=== West Virginia Space Grant Consortium ===
- West Virginia University

=== Wisconsin Space Grant Consortium ===
- Carthage College
- Lawrence University
- University of Wisconsin–Green Bay

=== Wyoming NASA Space Grant Consortium ===
- University of Wyoming

== See also ==
- Land Grant Colleges
- Sea Grant Colleges
- Sun Grant Colleges
