= The Christa McAuliffe Prize =

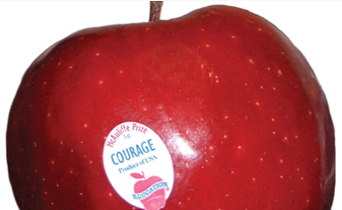
For Courage and Excellence in Education

The Nebraska Christa McAuliffe Prize For Courage and Excellence in Education is an award given annually to recognize a teacher in Nebraska for showing courage in education. Founded in 1987 this award was founded in memorial to Christa McAuliffe, the teacher/astronaut who lost her life in the Challenger space shuttle accident in January, 1986. This fund provides a way to recognize these teachers, and at the same time honor the memory of Ms. McAuliffe's courage. Among the recipients of the Mcauliffe Prize over the past 20 years have been teachers who exemplified courage in many ways, including befriending and helping deaf people expand their capacity to learn despite a closed learning center to virtually adopting students and helping them out financially while fighting school bureaucracy. The winning teacher receives a $1000 stipend and a plaque that is presented at a banquet held in his or her honor. This year the winning school will receive a $500 award to help support important school activities.

== Recipients ==
- 2018 - Elena Garcia
- 2017 - Cheyenne Janssen
- 2016 - Joe DiCostanzo
- 2015 - LeeAnn Vaughn
- 2014 - Pam Mitchell
- 2013 - Kimberly Snyder
- 2012 - Bryan Corkle
- 2011 - Kathy Bohac
- 2010 - Lynn Channer
- 2010 - Rhonda Josten
- 2009 - Nancy Lueking
- 2008 - Doug Keel
- 2007 - Calvin Rife
- 2005 - Dianne Epp
- 2004 - Joan Christen
- 2003 - Doris Martin
- 2002 - Susan Weber
- 2001 - Lorrie Schrad
- 2000 - Jamalee Stone
- 1999 - Kathy Stockham
- 1998 - Libby Putz
- 1997 - Roger Kassebaum
- 1996 - Genevieve Ramsey
- 1995 - Sandra Fabry
- 1994 - Ronald Callan
- 1993 - KrisAnn Sullivan
- 1992 - Mildred Mobley
- 1991 - Michael Tolfa
- 1990 - Susan McNeil
- 1989 - John Keenan
- 1988 - Laurie Moriarty
- 1987 - Barbara Hopkins

Nominations for this award can be submitted to the University of Nebraska–Lincoln through their website and is open to any Nebraska teacher that demonstrates courage in education.
