= Christa McAuliffe =

American teacher and astronaut (1948–1986)

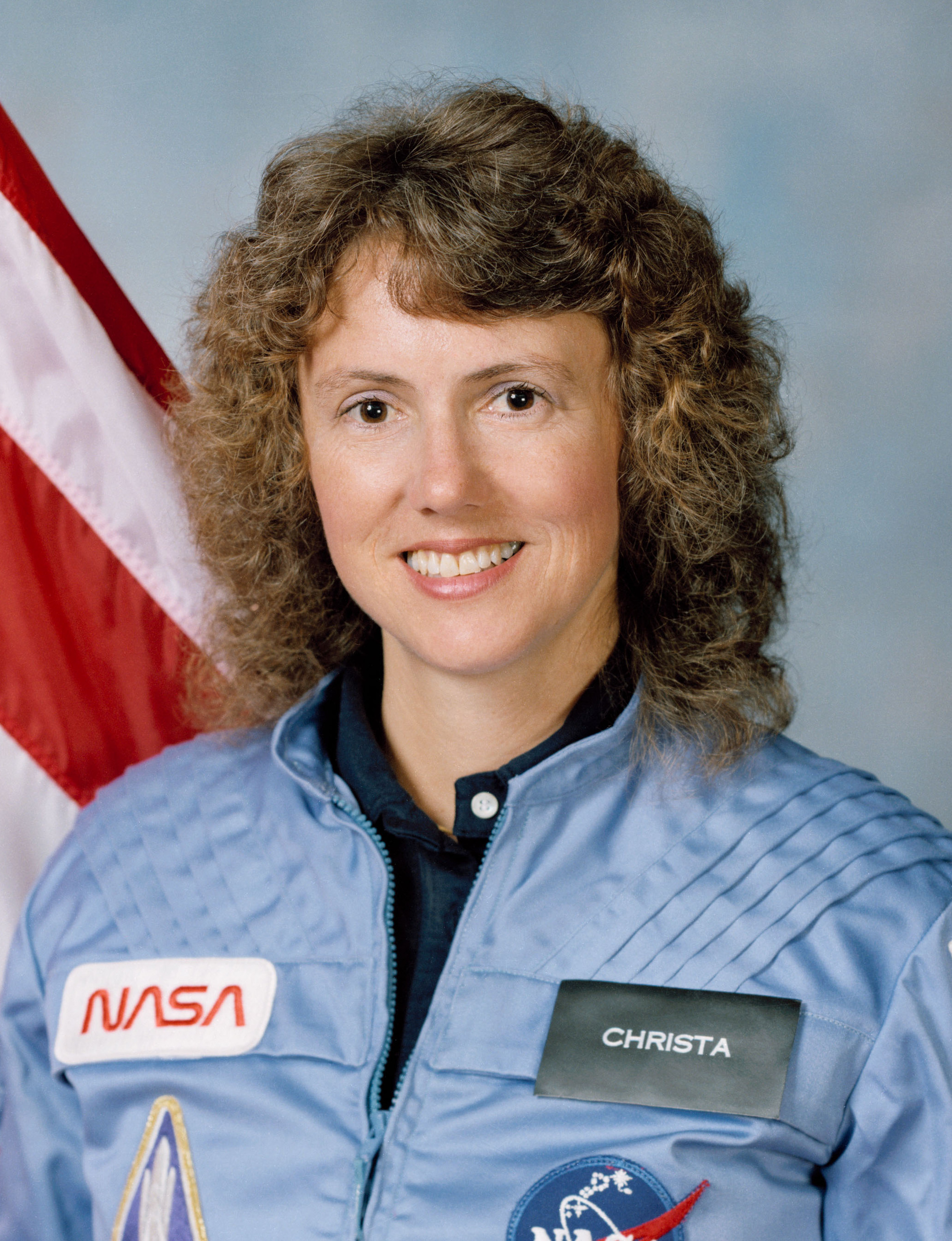
- McAuliffe in 1985
- Born: Sharon Christa Corrigan; September 2, 1948; Boston, Massachusetts, U.S.
- Died: January 28, 1986 (aged 37); North Atlantic Ocean
- Cause of death: Space Shuttle Challenger disaster
- Resting place: Blossom Hill Cemetery; Concord, New Hampshire
- Education: Framingham State University (BS); Bowie State University (MA)
- Spouse: Steven J. McAuliffe (m. 1970)
- Children: 2
- Awards: Congressional Space Medal of Honor
- Space career

NASA Space flight participant
- Selection: Teacher in Space Project (1985)
- Mission: STS-51-L

Sharon Christa McAuliffe (née Corrigan; September 2, 1948 – January 28, 1986) was an American teacher and astronaut from Concord, New Hampshire, who died on the Space Shuttle Challenger on mission STS-51-L, where she was serving as a payload specialist.

McAuliffe received her bachelor's degree in education and history from Framingham State College in 1970 and her master's degree in education, supervision and administration from Bowie State University in 1978. McAuliffe took a teaching position as a social studies teacher at Concord High School in New Hampshire in 1983.

In 1985, McAuliffe was selected from more than 11,000 applicants to NASA's Teacher in Space Project and was scheduled to become the first teacher to fly in space. As a member of mission STS-51-L, she was planning to conduct experiments and teach two lessons from Challenger. On January 28, 1986, the shuttle broke apart 73 seconds after launch, killing all onboard. After McAuliffe's death, several schools were named in her honor, and McAuliffe was posthumously awarded the Congressional Space Medal of Honor in 2004. In 2024, a statue of McAuliffe was installed on the grounds of the New Hampshire State Capitol.

== Early life ==
Sharon Christa Corrigan was born on September 2, 1948, in Boston as the oldest of the five children of accountant Edward Christopher Corrigan (1922–1990), who was of English and Irish descent; and Grace Mary Corrigan (née George; 1924–2018), a substitute teacher, whose father was of Lebanese Maronite descent. McAuliffe was a great niece of Lebanese-American historian Philip Khuri Hitti. McAuliffe was known by her middle name from an early age, and in later years she signed her name "S. Christa Corrigan", and eventually "S. Christa McAuliffe".

The year McAuliffe was born, her father was completing his sophomore year at Boston College. Not long after, he took a job as an assistant comptroller in a Boston department store, and they moved to Framingham, Massachusetts, where McAuliffe attended Marian High School, graduating in 1966. She went on to earn a bachelor's degree in 1970 from Framingham State College, now Framingham State University. As a youth, McAuliffe was inspired by Project Mercury and the Apollo Moon landing program. The day after John Glenn orbited the Earth in Friendship 7, she told a friend at Marian High, "Do you realize that someday people will be going to the Moon? Maybe even taking a bus, and I want to do that!" McAuliffe wrote years later on her NASA application form: "I watched the Space Age being born, and I would like to participate."

In 1970, McAuliffe married her longtime boyfriend whom she had known since high school, Steven J. McAuliffe, a 1970 graduate of the Virginia Military Institute. The couple moved closer to Washington, D.C., so that he could attend the Georgetown University Law Center. They had two children, Scott and Caroline, who were nine and six respectively when she died.

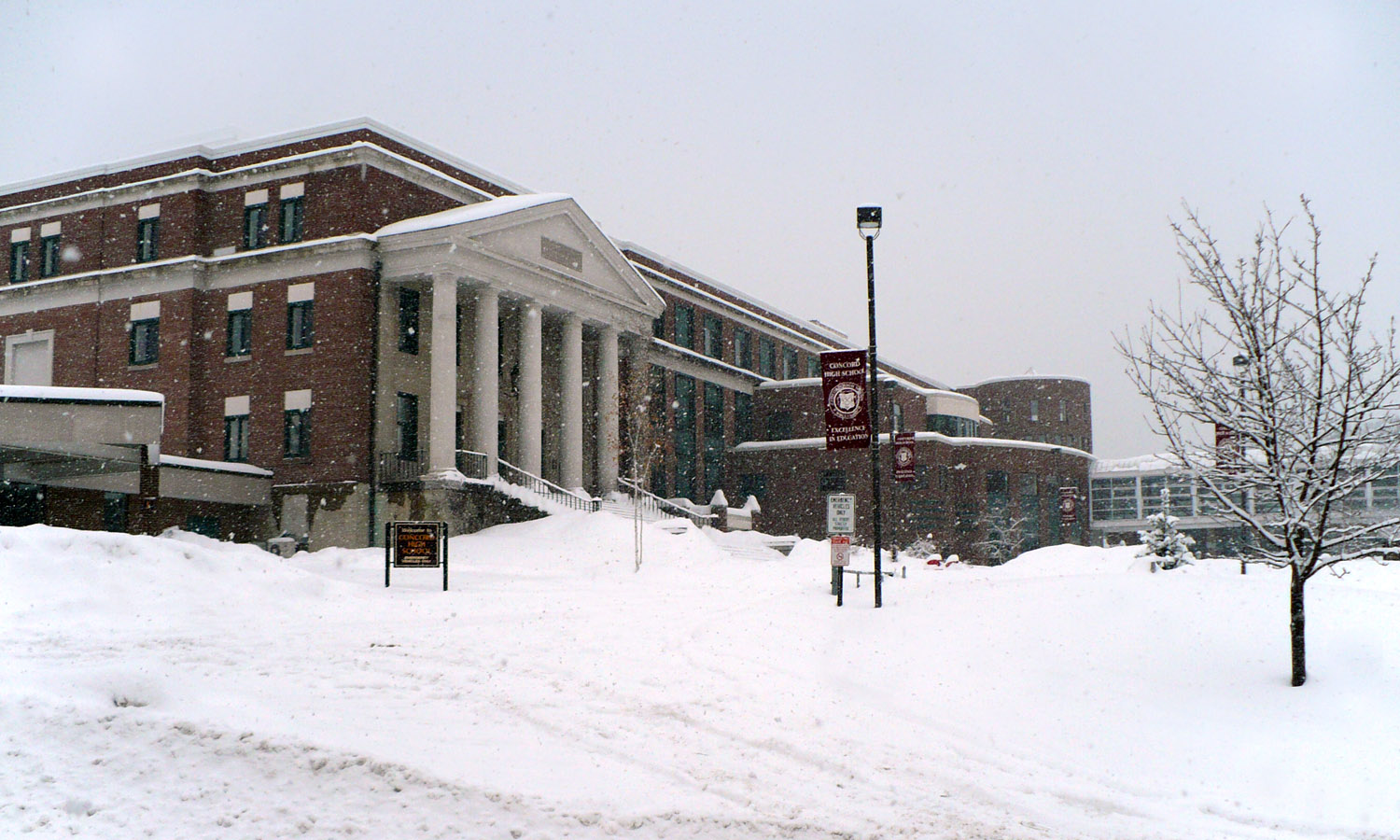
McAuliffe was a teacher at Concord High School in New Hampshire.

McAuliffe obtained her first teaching position in 1970, as an American history teacher at Benjamin Foulois Junior High School in Morningside, Maryland. From 1971 to 1978, she taught history and civics at Thomas Johnson Middle School in Lanham, Maryland. In addition to teaching, McAuliffe completed a Master of Arts in education supervision and administration from Bowie State University in Maryland. In 1978, she moved to Concord, New Hampshire, when Steven accepted a job as an assistant to the New Hampshire Attorney General. McAuliffe taught seventh and eighth grade American history and English in Concord, New Hampshire, and ninth grade English in Bow, New Hampshire, before taking a teaching post at Concord High School in 1983.

McAuliffe was a social studies teacher, and taught several courses including American history, law, and economics, in addition to a self-designed course: "The American Woman". Taking field trips and bringing in speakers were an important part of her teaching techniques. According to The New York Times, McAuliffe "emphasized the impact of ordinary people on history, saying they were as important to the historical record as kings, politicians or generals."

== Teacher in Space Project ==
Announcement by George Bush of the First Teacher in Space, July 19, 1985.

In 1984, President Ronald Reagan announced the Teacher in Space Project, and McAuliffe learned about NASA's efforts to find their first civilian, an educator, to fly into space. NASA wanted to find an "ordinary person," a gifted teacher who could communicate with students while in orbit. McAuliffe became one of more than 11,000 applicants.

NASA hoped that sending a teacher into space would increase public interest in the Space Shuttle program, and also demonstrate the reliability of space flight at a time when the agency was under continuous pressure to find financial support. President Reagan said it would also remind Americans of the important role that teachers and education serve in their country.

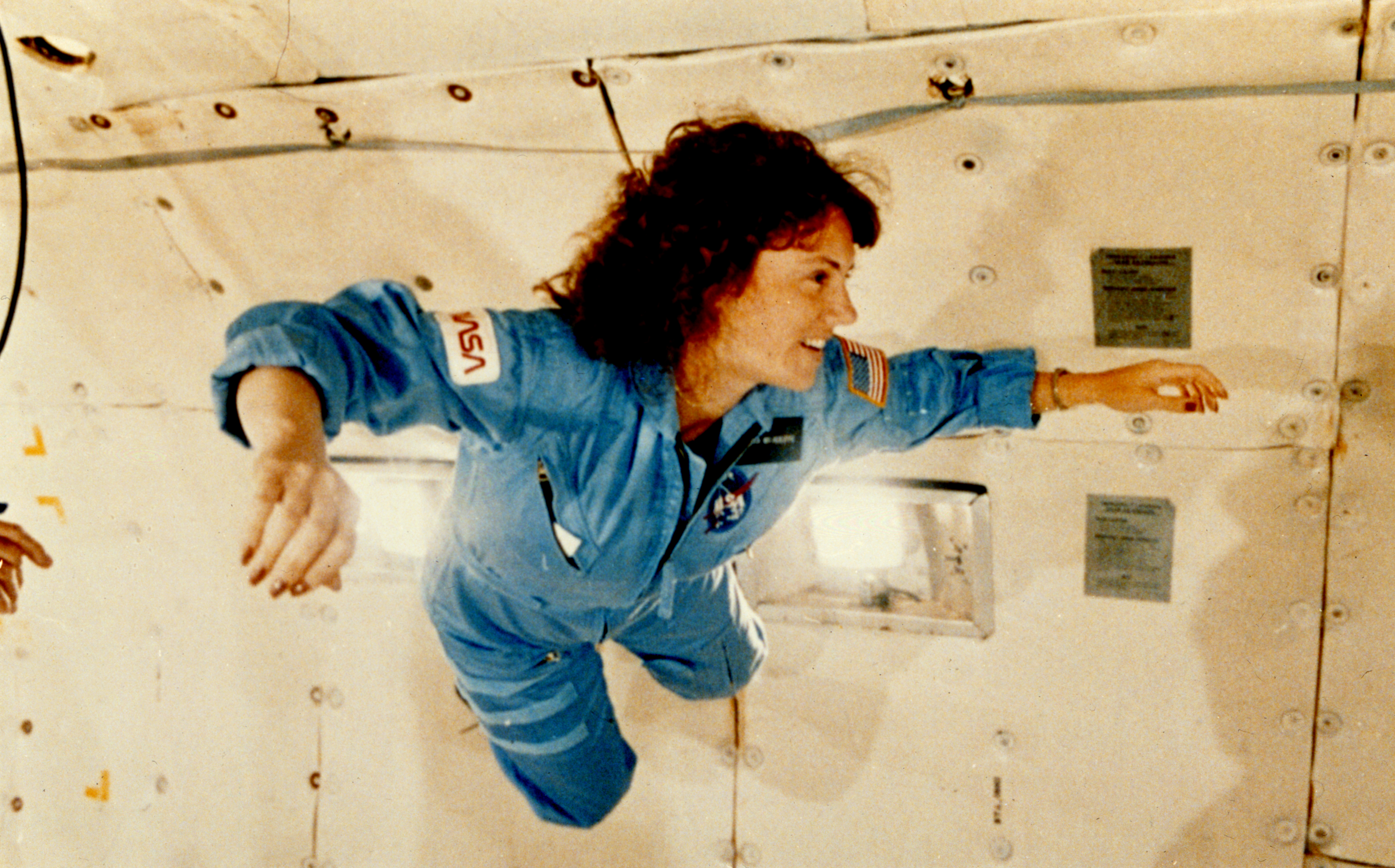
McAuliffe undergoing pre-flight training experiences weightlessness during a KC-135 "vomit comet" flight

The Council of Chief State School Officers, a non-profit organization of public officials in education, was chosen by NASA to coordinate the selection process. Out of the initial applicant pool, 114 semi-finalists were nominated by state, territorial, and agency review panels. McAuliffe was one of two teachers nominated by the state of New Hampshire. The semi-finalists gathered in Washington, D.C., from June 22–27, 1985, for a conference on space education and to meet with the Review Panel that would select the 10 finalists.

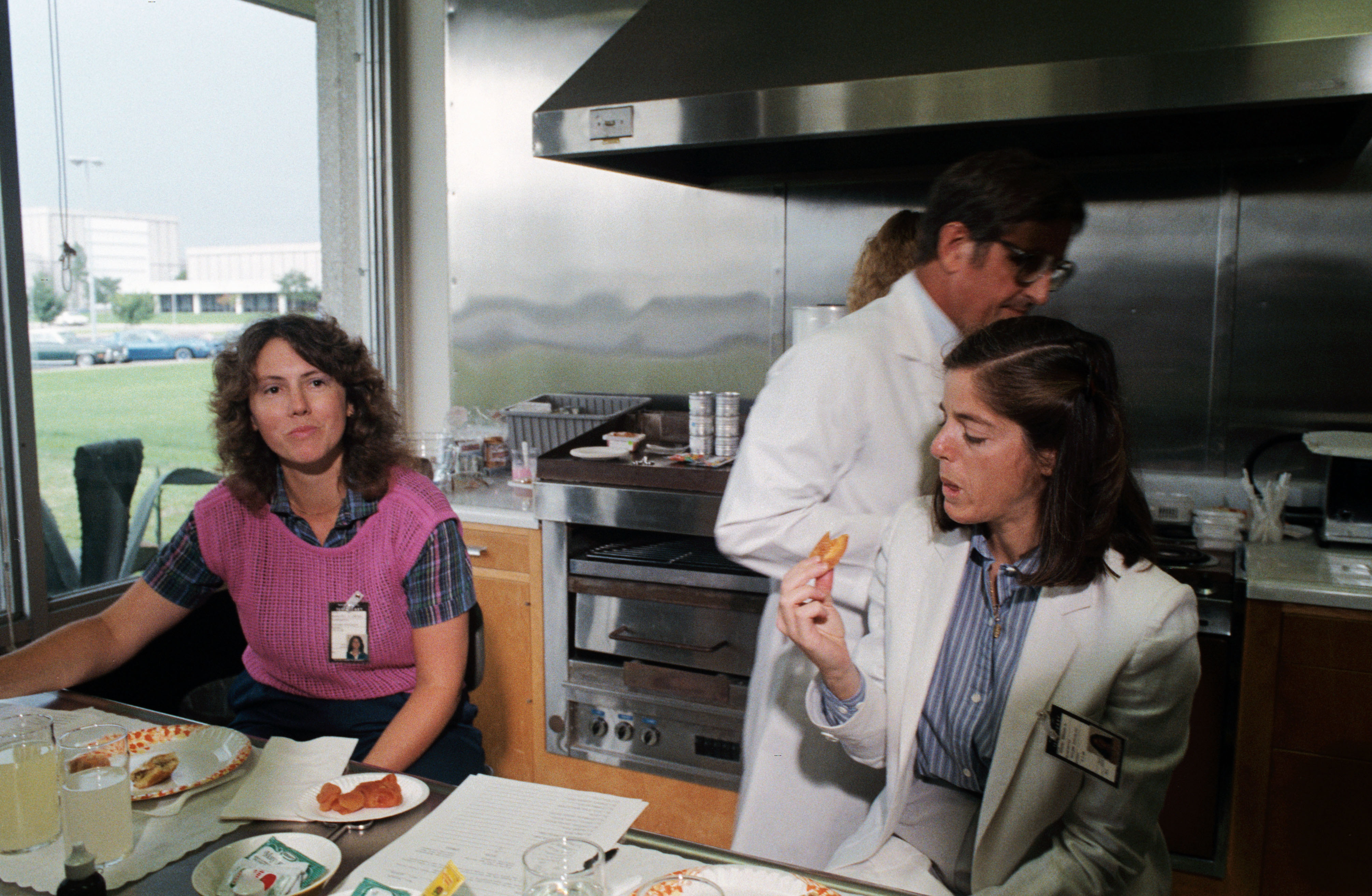
McAuliffe (left) and her backup Barbara Morgan (right) try out space food in the canteen of the Johnson Space Center, Sep 10, 1985

On July 1, 1985, McAuliffe was announced as one of the 10 finalists, and on July 7 she traveled to Johnson Space Center for a week of thorough medical examinations and briefings about space flight. The finalists were interviewed by an evaluation committee composed of senior NASA officials, and the committee made recommendations to NASA Administrator James M. Beggs for the primary and backup candidates for the Teacher in Space Project. On July 19, 1985, Vice President George H. W. Bush announced that McAuliffe had been selected for the position. Another teacher, Barbara Morgan, served as her backup. According to Mark Travis of the Concord Monitor, it was McAuliffe's manner that set her apart from the other candidates. NASA official Alan Ladwig said "she had an infectious enthusiasm", and NASA psychiatrist Terrence McGuire told New Woman magazine that "she was the most broad-based, best-balanced person of the 10."

McAuliffe's NASA interview film during training for STS-51-L.

Later that year, McAuliffe and Morgan each took a year-long leave of absence from teaching in order to train for a Space Shuttle mission in early 1986. NASA paid both their salaries. While not a member of the NASA Astronaut Corps, McAuliffe was to be part of the STS-51-L crew, and would conduct experiments and teach lessons from space. Her planned duties included basic science experiments in the fields of chromatography, hydroponics, magnetism, and Newton's laws. She was also planning to conduct two 15-minute classes from space, including a tour of the spacecraft, called "The Ultimate Field Trip", and a lesson about the benefits of space travel, called "Where We've Been, Where We're Going, Why". The lessons were to be broadcast to millions of schoolchildren via closed-circuit TV. To record her thoughts, McAuliffe intended to keep a personal journal like a "woman on the Conestoga wagons pioneering the West."

After being chosen to be the first teacher in space, McAuliffe was a guest on several television programs, including Good Morning America; the CBS Morning News; the Today Show; and The Tonight Show Starring Johnny Carson, where, when asked about the mission, she stated, "If you're offered a seat on a rocket ship, don't ask what seat. Just get on." She had an immediate rapport with the media, and the Teacher in Space Project received popular attention as a result.

== Disaster and aftermath ==
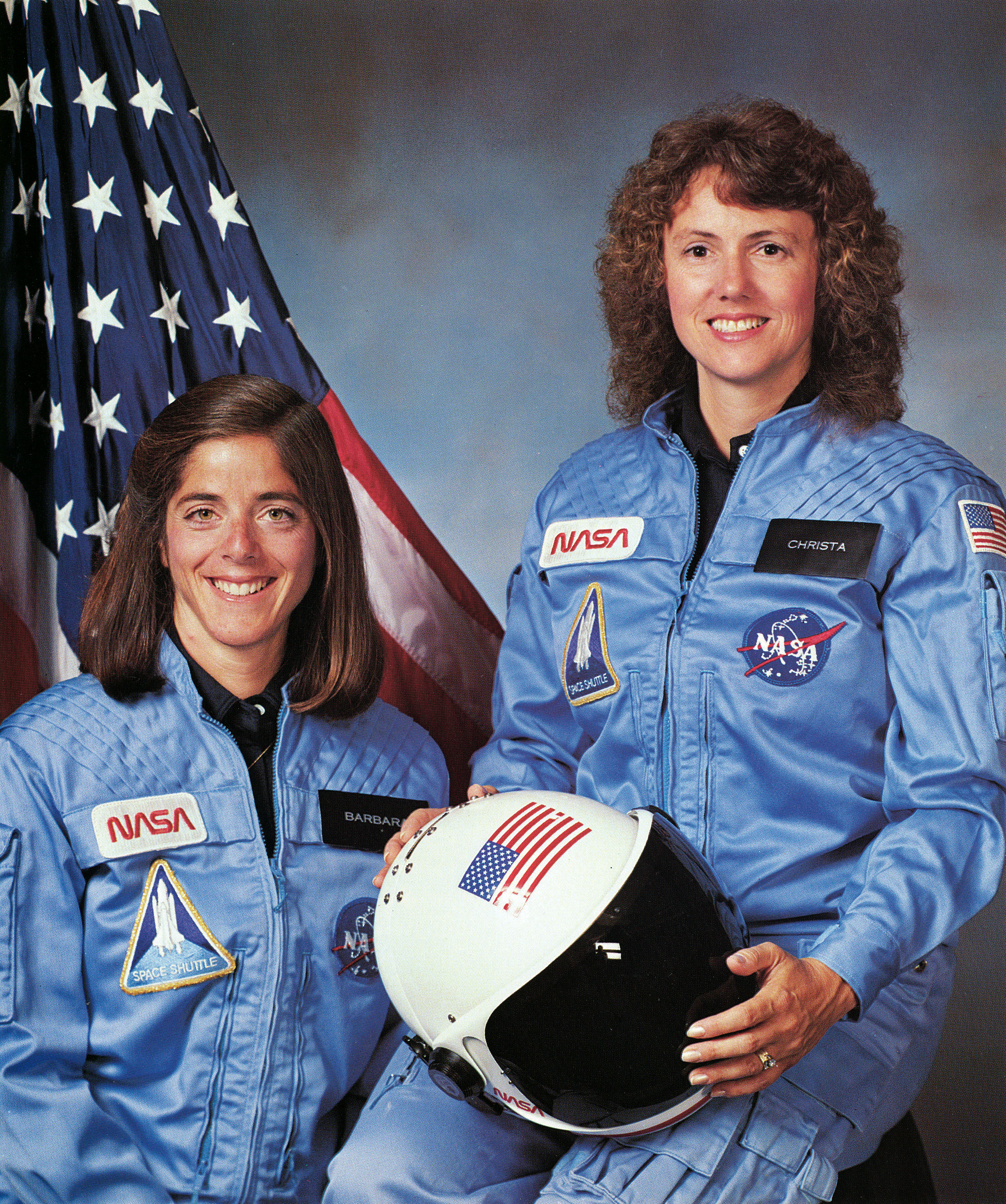
McAuliffe and Barbara Morgan

On January 28, 1986, McAuliffe boarded Challenger with the other six crew members of STS-51-L. Only 73 seconds into its flight at an altitude of 48,000 ft (14,630.400 m), the shuttle broke apart, resulting in the deaths of all seven crew members.

According to NASA, the accident had such a significant effect on the nation in part because of the excitement over McAuliffe's presence on the shuttle. Many schoolchildren were viewing the launch live, and media coverage of the accident was extensive.

Barbara Morgan, her backup, became a professional astronaut in January 1998, and flew on Space Shuttle mission STS-118, to the International Space Station, on August 8, 2007, aboard Endeavour, the orbiter that replaced Challenger.

== Legacy ==
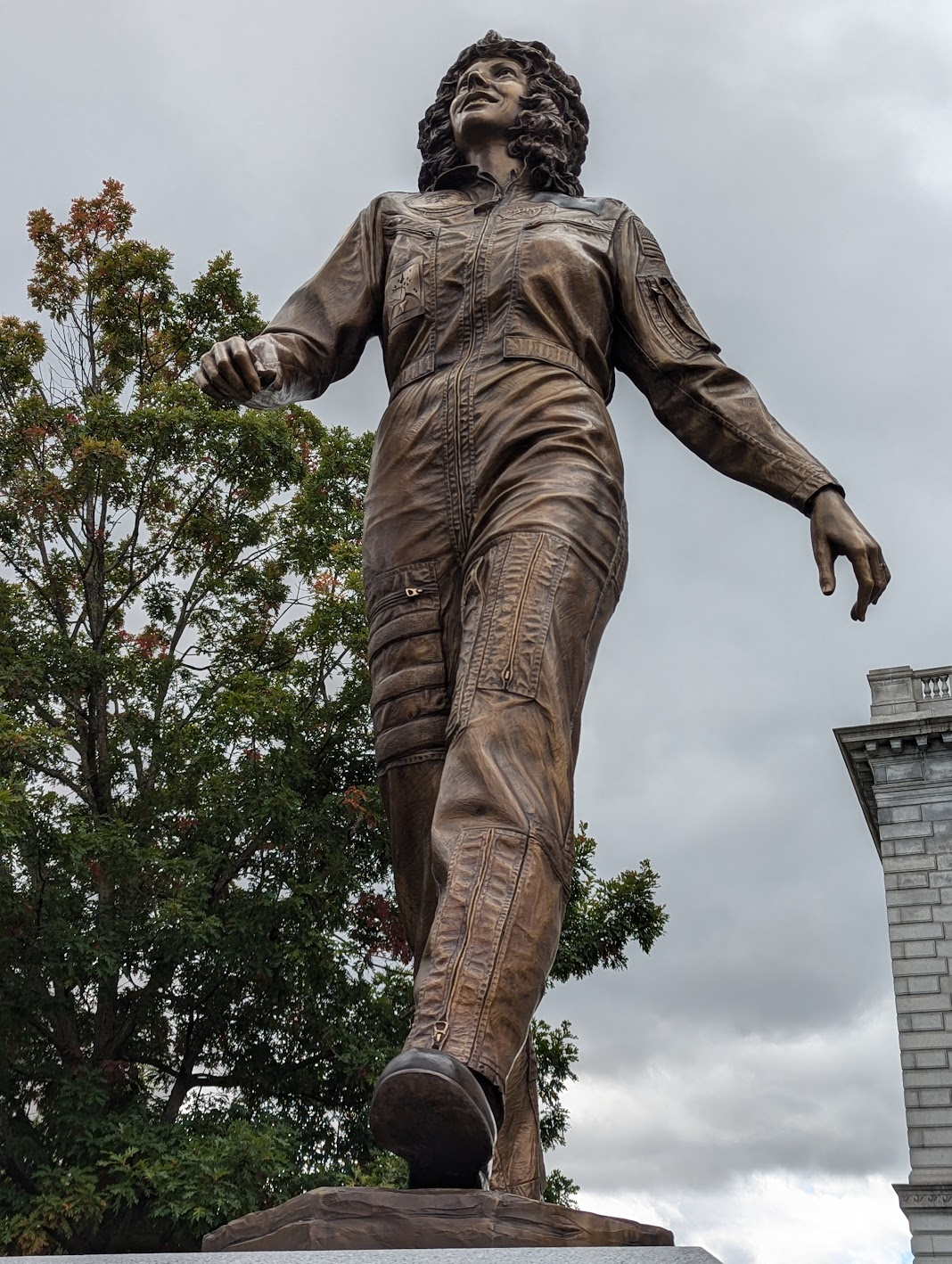
In 2024, a statue of McAuliffe was unveiled on the grounds of the New Hampshire State House, the first woman and first non-elected official so honored

McAuliffe was buried at Blossom Hill Cemetery in her hometown of Concord. McAuliffe has since been honored at many events, including the Daytona 500 NASCAR race in 1986. She was posthumously awarded the Frank J. Malina Astronautics Medal later that year. Christa McAuliffe Elementary School in Lenexa, KS was the first to be named in 1987. The McAuliffe-Shepard Discovery Center in Concord, Christa McAuliffe Middle School in Stockton, California, the Christa Corrigan McAuliffe Center for Education and Teaching Excellence at Framingham State University, the Christa McAuliffe Intermediate School (IS 187 - Christa McAuliffe) in Brooklyn, McAuliffe elementary in Green Bay, Wisconsin, the McAuliffe Branch Library in Framingham, MA, the Christa McAuliffe Adult Learning Center in Baton Rouge, LA, the S. Christa McAuliffe Elementary School in Lowell, Massachusetts, the S. Crista McAuliffe Elementary School in Germantown, Maryland, Christa McAuliffe Elementary School in Highland Village, TX, Christa McAuliffe Elementary School in Sammamish, Washington and Christa McAuliffe Middle School in Jackson, NJ, Christa McAuliffe Middle School in Bay City, MI, Christa McAuliffe Middle School in Boynton Beach, FL, and The Christa McAuliffe Residential Community (CMRC) dorm and wellness center on the campus of her alma mater of Bowie State University in Bowie, Maryland, Christa McAuliffe Elementary School in Saratoga, California, Christa McAuliffe Park in Cameron Park, California, and the S. Christa McAuliffe STEM Academy in Greeley, CO, were all named in her memory, as are the asteroid 3352 McAuliffe, the crater McAuliffe on the Moon, and a crater on the planet Venus, which was named McAuliffe by the Soviet Union. Approximately 40 schools around the world have been named after McAuliffe, including the Christa McAuliffe Space Education Center in Pleasant Grove, Utah. Christa McAuliffe Park in Green Bay, WI is named after her. Christa McAuliffe Middle School in Houston is named in her memory.

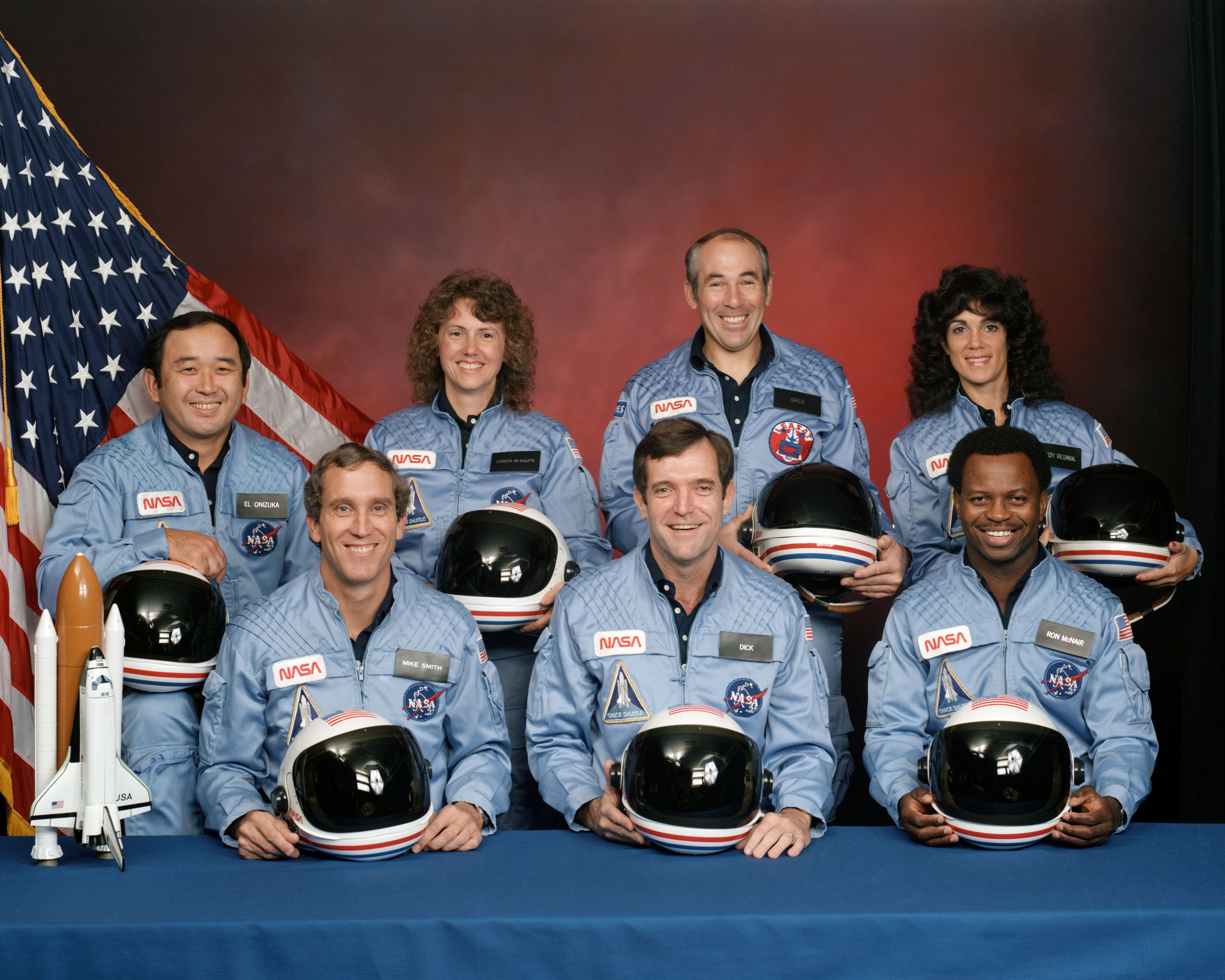
Challenger crew from left to right: (front row) Michael J. Smith, Dick Scobee, Ronald McNair; (back row) Ellison Onizuka, Christa McAuliffe, Gregory Jarvis, and Judith Resnik

Scholarships and other events have also been established in McAuliffe's memory. The Christa McAuliffe Technology Conference has been held in Nashua, New Hampshire, every year since 1986, and is devoted to the use of technology in all aspects of education. The Nebraska McAuliffe Prize honors a Nebraska teacher each year for courage and excellence in education. Grants in McAuliffe's name, honoring innovative teachers, are provided by the American Association of State Colleges and Universities and the National Council for the Social Studies.

In 1990, her hometown of Concord New Hampshire opened the McAuliffe-Shepard Discovery Center. The center is "dedicated to the New Hampshire space pioneers Christa McAuliffe and Alan Shepard. The facility is a 45,000 square feet air and space museum easily accessible to all of New England and mid coast states. The museum features a vintage Crusader Jet and is one of only five planetariums in all of North America with a 10K projection system. The planetarium features engaging displays with several showings each day, constantly rotating new, imaginative and entertaining shows.

The Christa McAuliffe Space Center in Pleasant Grove, Utah, teaches school children about space, and is visited by students from around the world. It has a number of space flight simulators. The center was started in 1990 by Victor Williamson, an educator at Central Elementary School. It is a 4,000-square-foot (370 m2) building added onto Central Elementary. It aims to teach astronomy and social studies through the use of simulators; the first, Voyager, proved itself popular, and a new planetarium was added in 2020. As the years passed, the demand for flights expanded and new ships were commissioned.

I cannot join the space program and restart my life as an astronaut, but this opportunity to connect my abilities as an educator with my interests in history and space is a unique opportunity to fulfill my early fantasies. I will never give up.

— Christa McAuliffe, 1985

McAuliffe's parents worked with Framingham State College to establish the McAuliffe Center. Her husband, Steven J. McAuliffe, later remarried, and in 1992 became a federal judge, serving with the United States District Court for the District of New Hampshire in Concord. Her son, Scott, completed graduate studies in marine biology, and her daughter, Caroline, went on to pursue the same career as her mother: teaching. On July 23, 2004, McAuliffe and all the other 13 astronauts lost in both the Challenger and Columbia disasters were posthumously awarded the Congressional Space Medal of Honor by President George W. Bush.

On January 28, 2016, several teachers who competed alongside McAuliffe for a seat on the Challenger traveled to Cape Canaveral, Florida, for a 30th anniversary remembrance service, along with her widower, Steven, and son, Scott. After remarking that 30 years had passed, Steven said "Challenger will always be an event that occurred just recently. Our thoughts and memories of Christa will always be fresh and comforting." In 2017, McAuliffe was inducted into the International Air & Space Hall of Fame at the San Diego Air & Space Museum. In 2019, Congress passed the Christa McAuliffe Commemorative Coin Act which was signed into law by President Donald Trump on October 9, 2019. The bill allows the Department of the Treasury to "issue not more than 350,000 $1 silver coins in commemoration of Christa McAuliffe." The coins were minted in 2021.

The 2024 documentary Christa: From Ordinary to Extraordinary by New Hampshire PBS looks at her life in New Hampshire and Concord, with people she knew talking about what she wanted for students to know about the role of women in history. On September 2, 2024, McAuliffe's 76th birthday, a statue of the astronaut was unveiled at the New Hampshire State Capitol. The statue, sculpted by artist Benjamin Victor, is the first statue of a woman on the state house grounds. Inscribed on the side of the statue's pedestal is a quote from McAuliffe: "I touch the future, I teach".

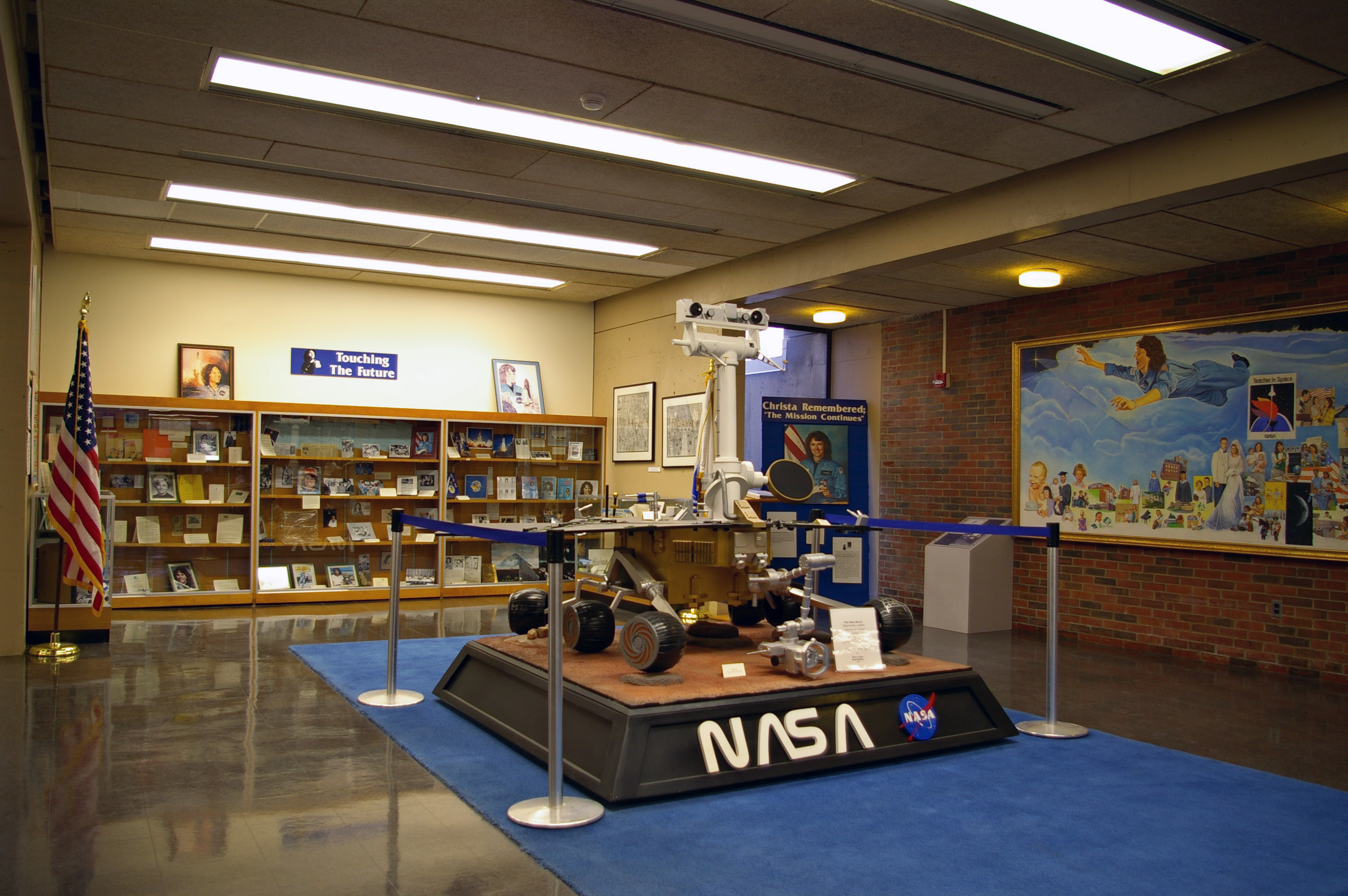
The McAuliffe Exhibit in the Henry Whittemore Library at Framingham State University

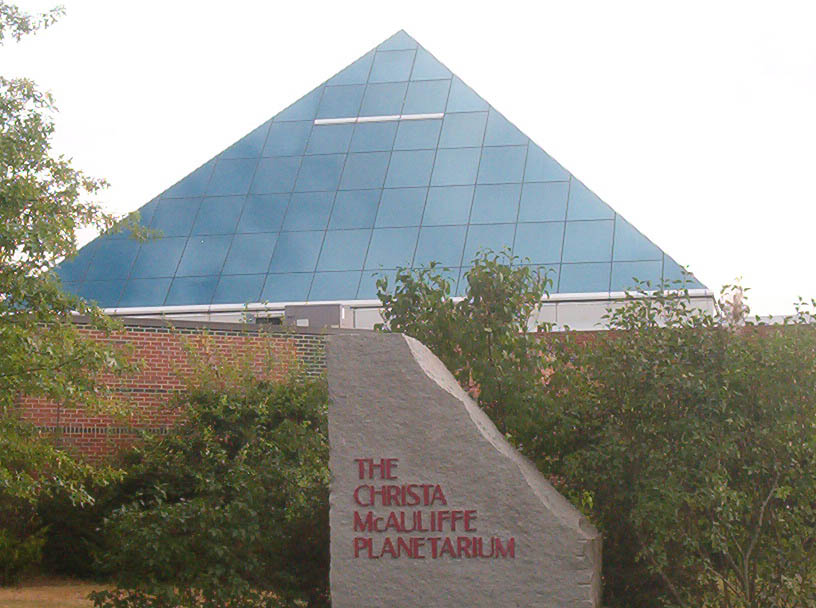
The McAuliffe-Shepard Discovery Center (then named the Christa McAuliffe Planetarium as seen on the sign) in Concord, New Hampshire

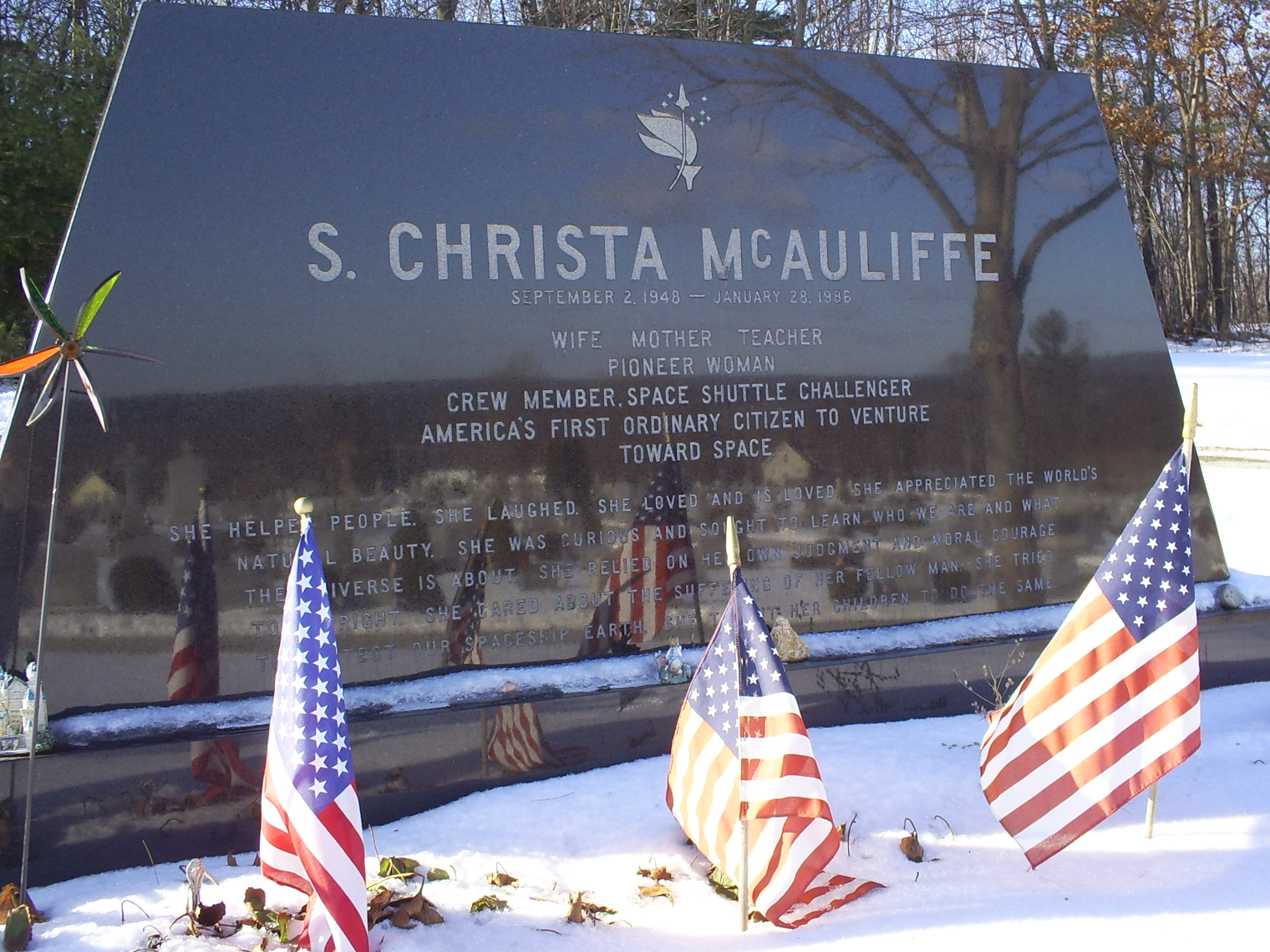
McAuliffe's grave in Concord, New Hampshire
