= Indiana Space Grant Consortium =

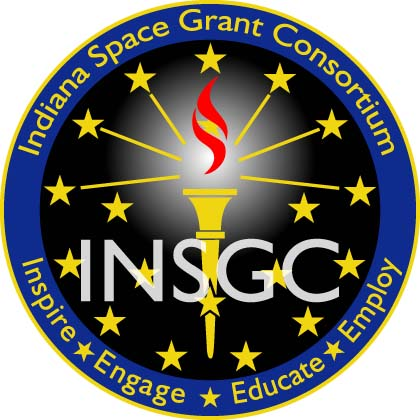
- Type: Non-Profit
- Region served: Indiana
- Key people: Dr. Barrett Caldwell
- Revenue: NASA and Non-government
- Website: www.insgc.org

The Indiana Space Grant Consortium (INSGC) is a non-profit organization. INSGC's goal is expanding opportunities for the people of Indiana to learn about and participate in NASA's activities by supporting and enhancing science, technology, engineering, and math education, research and public outreach efforts. INSGC includes 23 academic, outreach, and corporate affiliates who work together to promote STEM education initiatives related to NASA themes and careers in the State of Indiana. Purdue University in West Lafayette, IN, serves as the INSGC lead institution under the direction of Dr. Barrett Caldwell.

== History ==
INSGC is part of the National Space Grant College and Fellowship Program. Space Grant was first established under Title II of the National Aeronautics and Space Administration Authorization Act of 1988. A unique national program - inspired by the mission and work of NASA - Space Grant enhances the United States' capabilities to carry out education, research, and public outreach activities in science, technology, engineering, and mathematics (STEM) and additional fields related to space, aeronautics, life science, physical science and earth system science.

== INSGC Vision ==
The INSGC is a premier source of coordination, information, and inspiration for the NASA-related education, outreach, and workforce needs of the State of Indiana.

As part of this vision, INSGC has set the following goals to align with NASA Education Outcomes:

1. INSGC promotes NASA-related Science, Technology, Engineering, and Mathematics (STEM) workforce development by providing support to STEM research and education in higher education settings.
2. INSGC provides educational opportunities for K-12 students and teachers in order to inspire students to STEM disciplines.
3. INSGC collaborates with formal and informal STEM educators in order to promote awareness of NASA-related missions to the general public.
