= Lebanon College =

Private two-year college in Lebanon, New Hampshire, United States

Coordinates: 43°38′33″N 72°15′11″W

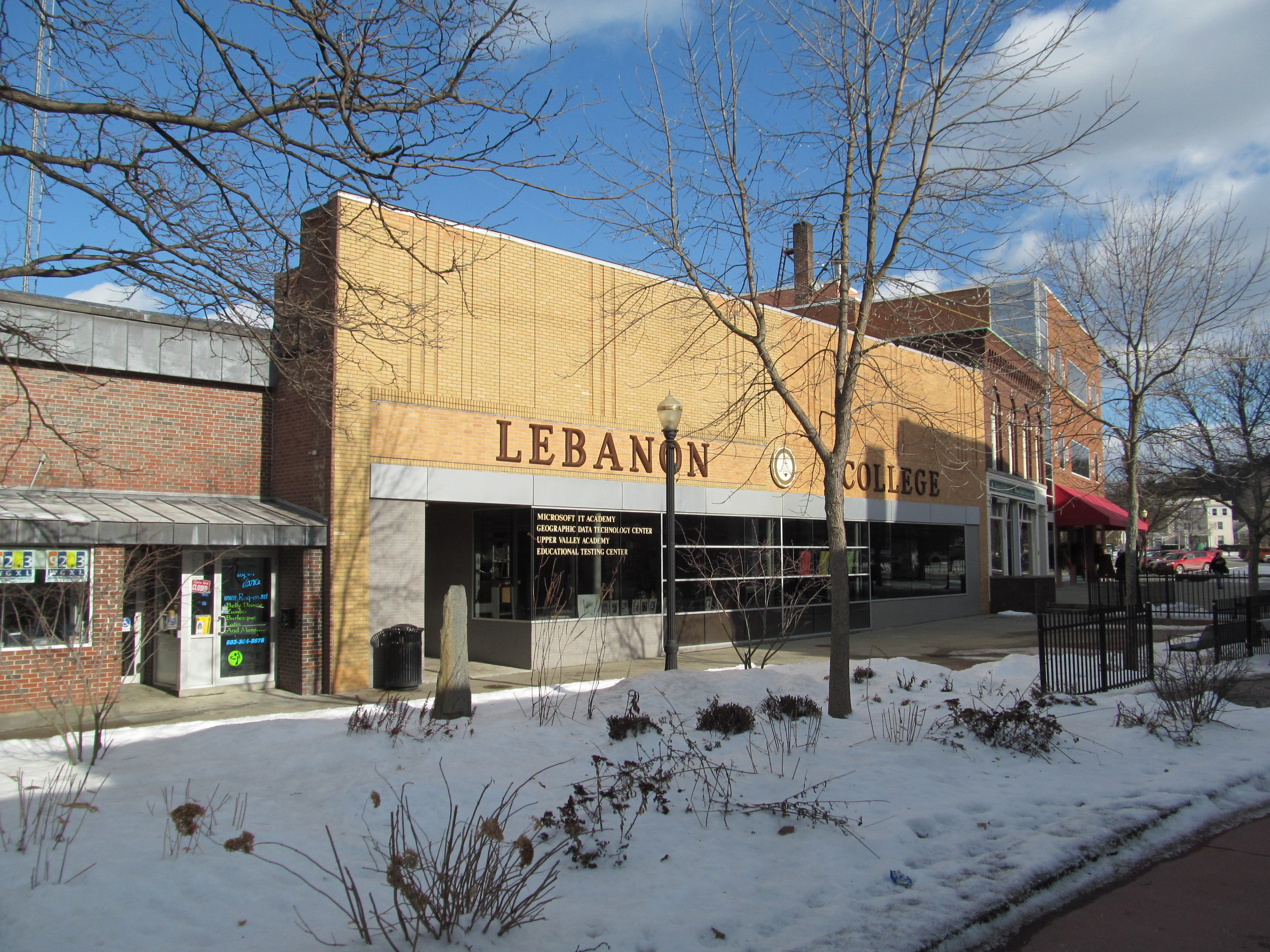
- Type: Private
- Active: 1956–2014
- Location: Lebanon, New Hampshire, United States
- Website: www.lebanoncollege.edu

Lebanon College was a two-year private not-for-profit college located in Lebanon, New Hampshire. It was founded in 1956, and closed in 2014, due to financial difficulties. In 2015 Lebanon College facilities and certain programs were purchased by the public community college system of New Hampshire. After renovations to the main academic building, the Lebanon campus of River Valley Community College opened in January 2016.

Lebanon College had been approved by the New Hampshire Post-secondary Commission to offer the associate degree, and was certified by the State of Vermont Department of Education, Office of Postsecondary, to offer programs and courses in that state. The college was accredited by the American Council of Independent Schools and Colleges (ACICS). The Radiography Program at Lebanon College was accredited by the Joint Review Committee on Education In Radiologic Technology (JRCERT).

== History ==
Founded in 1956, the college grew slowly, adding academic programs over several decades. Originally lacking a campus, academic programs were scattered and held wherever space could be found. In 1997, Donald Wenz was named the college's tenth president, and launched a "Campaign for Renewal" to purchase and renovate the old Woolworth's building in downtown Lebanon. The building was made into the main campus center for the college. In 2008 a second 11,000-square-foot (1,000 m^{2}) building, to house the new and existing health and science courses and programs, was acquired. That same year, bachelor's degrees in nursing and radiography were authorized by the State. Students will enter the new 4-year degrees in 2009.

In 1980 a small endowment of $100,000 was fund raised. In 2006, on the institution's 50th anniversary, the college launched a "Campaign for the Future", an effort to raise $3 million to establish an endowment. Former surgeon general C. Everett Koop was the campaign's honorary chairman until his death in 2013.

The college closed at the end of the 2014 academic year.

== Academics ==
Lebanon College offered associates in art degrees in six areas: Fine Arts, Early Childhood Education, Criminal Justice, Photography and 3-D Medical Imaging. The college also offered several associates in business degrees, in Accounting, Management and Computer Information Science. An associate of science in Radiography, as well as bachelor's degrees in Nursing (RN - BSN) and Radiography, were also offered.

A number of certificate programs in similar areas of study were offered.

== Campus ==
Lebanon College's main campus was located at the heart of the city of Lebanon's downtown area, in the Historic District. The main campus housed academic and business offices, classrooms, science labs, an ETS computer testing center, student commons, the library, and computer labs. Although the college offered most courses and programs at the main campus, other off-campus locations included Dartmouth-Hitchcock Medical Center, several other Upper Valley hospitals, and Lebanon High School.
