= Christa McAuliffe Space Center =

Coordinates: 40.3651°N 111.7343°W

Logo used for the Christa McAuliffe Space Center

The Christa McAuliffe Space Center (known as the McAuliffe Space Center or CMSC), in Pleasant Grove, Utah, teaches school children about space and is visited by students from around the world. It has a number of space flight simulators.

The center, named for educator Christa McAuliffe, who was killed in the Challenger disaster, was started in 1990 by Victor Williamson, an educator at Central Elementary School. It is a 4,000-square-foot (370 m^{2}) building added onto Central Elementary. It aims to teach astronomy and social studies through the use of simulators; the first, Voyager, proved itself popular, and a new planetarium built in 2020. As the years passed, the demand for flights expanded and new ships were commissioned.

In October 2012, the space center was temporarily closed at Central Elementary but re-opened, following several district-mandated upgrades, closures, and maintenance procedures, in the spring of 2013. The original simulators, along with the school that housed them, was demolished on May 5, 2020, to make way for a new space center built behind the original property. The new space center included the second largest planetarium in the state of Utah, which started running shows in November 2020. In 2018, the Christa McAuliffe Space Education Center (as it was then called) removed the word "Education" from its name and also updated its logo to a new stylized version of the original.

== Simulators ==
The simulators employed by the center have included the following (in order of original construction):

- The USS Voyager (Original 1990) (Decommissioned 2012/2013, New 2018) The Voyager appears as the USS Enterprise-D. It held from nine to eleven people. The new Voyager is now located at Renaissance Academy in Utah, a space center separate from the Christa McAuliffe Space Center.
- The USS Odyssey (Original 1995, New 2013, Cutter: 2021) The Odyssey's appearance was created by Paul S. Cargile, an independent sci-fi artist. It takes on the appearance of the Banzai-class fighter. It holds six to eight people.
- The Galileo (Original Mark-5: 1998, New Mark-6: 2009, Experimental Stealth Craft 2021) The Galileo is a shuttle craft. It usually goes on stealth, or "off the books", missions. It can hold five to six people. The original simulator could be physically seen from the outside.
- The USS Magellan (Original Space Station: 1998, Renovated: 2006, Starship: 2012, Carrier: 2021) – The Magellan had the appearance of Deep Space 9. The Magellan was then transformed into a starship with the appearance of a Daedalus-class starship from Stargate in 2012. In 2021, with the opening of the new building, the Magellan was converted into a starship of original design, known as an Atlas Class Carrier. It is also equipped with a Slipstream Drive, which allows it to traverse great distances in space in a short amount of time. The bridge crew can be anywhere from ten to twelve people.
- The Falcon (Original 2000) (Decommissioned) – The Falcon showed students what space travel might be like in the future.
- The USS Phoenix (Original 2005, Destroyer: 2021) – The Phoenix was previously a Defiant-class escort, like DS9's USS Defiant. It is the space center's only battleship. It could hold five to six people. With the opening of the new building, it has been updated to an Astrea Class Destroyer, which can now hold six to seven people.
- The IMS Falcon (Cargo Ship: 2021) – The Falcon Is the only ship in the fleet that does not belong to the United Federation of Planets. It holds six to eight crew members.
- The USS Cassini (Explorer: 2021) – The Cassini is a deep space exploration vessel. It holds nine to eleven crew members.

Some simulators have their own plaque. The plaque displays the ship's names and other things about that specific simulator.

Most missions contain aspects of the Star Trek universe. However, the center has many original species and groups that help separate it. These include groups such as the Lisko Authority, Nox'Hun Imperium, Peylin, and Merchant's Guild.

The center and its founder were honored in a ceremony in its 15th year by many individuals, including Gary Herbert, the Lieutenant Governor of Utah. At that time, with its five spaceship simulators, it was educating 16,000 students a year.

== Teaching method ==
The space center uses its simulators in order to create interactive stories, usually applicable to historical events, in which the students are involved. Since November 2020, they also use the planetarium that was built during their 2020 rebuild.

Students also learn and apply different aspects of astronomy and science in missions. They get the chance to learn about black holes, nebulae, asteroids, planets, planetary systems, moons, and a variety of other phenomena.

Many students who attended the space center fifteen years ago are now pursuing fields in science, technology, space exploration, programming, and electrical engineering. Students at the local Brigham Young University have the opportunity to develop consoles and equipment for the space center, such as Tricorders, touch panel equipment, fiber optics systems, ships, and digital/analog control interfaces.

The center's staff hopes that its visitors are tomorrow's scientists.

== Simulator technology ==
The space center employs technologies and equipment to achieve its simulations. In each ship, there is a powerful sound system (including a powerful bass response to simulate the feeling of the reactor core) hooked up to an industry standard mixing board which combines input from a combination of sound sources heard through the main speakers, such as, sound effects, music, microphones, and voice distorter.

The video system is just as complex. In the past, missions had a story DVD with clips compiled for scenes in a story and other visual effects. These video sources were all controlled by a video switcher so that it appears to be a seamless video. Now, the space center uses a software called "Thorium" to manage mission visuals. The space center also makes its own tactical screens. Tactical screens are in essence complex power points that can be networked to display real time information about the ship. This information may include information about things related to the current story such as ship systems while others may be maps or other mission information. Various programs have been used to create these screens, including HyperCard, Runtime Revolution, and Thorium.

Each simulator is also equipped with a lighting system allowing several different colored lights to be displayed. For instance, red during alerts and blue during normal alert levels. Each set of lights is attached to a dimmer in the control room allowing the lights to manually fluctuate in different events during a mission, such as a torpedo impact or power failure.

In order to ensure that visitors are safe, a network of cameras is also installed at key points on the set to monitor their positions. Each simulator has part of the bridge and connected areas of the set monitored at all times.

The most complex part of each simulator is the computer systems. Each ship has several computers installed. The smallest set, the Galileo, has five, while the largest set, the Magellan, has 13. Each one of these computers (excluding sound effect computers and tactical [main viewer] computers) is connected to a network allowing communication between computers. In this way, the programs on each of the computers are also able to communicate with each other, allowing the control room to monitor the simulation and for computers on the bridge to update each other with information sent from the control room. The programming on each of the computers used to be programmed in HyperCard, which was in use on the USS Voyager until the simulator was decommissioned. Later however, the space center switched to Revolution by Runtime Revolution. The next generation of programs at the space center were programmed in Cocoa, Apple Inc's own programming language for their Macintosh computer platform. Since 2018, the space center has used the Thorium open-source starship simulator platform, developed by a former volunteer.

Private donations paid for the simulators, while the school district pays the salary of the center's director. 181 volunteers and part-timers help to operate the simulators.

== Staff ==
The space center's only full-time employee is the director. Flight directors, set directors, and supervisors are part-time employees.

- Flight directors – (dark-blue-collared shirts) The flight directors (FDs) "run" the missions—giving cues to the actors, telling the staff when to do certain things, assigning roles, etc. An FD also is the voice of the main computer and the main engineer (whom the crew cannot see), giving them hints and tips along the way.
- Set directors – (grey-collared shirts) There are six set directors (one for each of the simulators). A set director makes major decisions for the simulator that he or she directs. A set director is usually the main FD for that ship.
- Supervisors – (royal-blue-collared shirts) A supervisor supervises a mission as the FD's right-hand man or woman, relaying orders, helping to get the story moving, coordinating volunteers, etc. Supervisors are second in command, but are only used on missions in Magellan and Cassini, and previously in the Voyager. They work with the crews to answer any questions they may have during a mission. Many FD's start out as supervisors, and many FD's still supervise even after they have been made flight directors.
- Navigators – (maroon-collared shirts) Navigators are the staff members in charge of operating the space center's planetarium.
- Volunteers – (black shirts) Volunteers are the arms and legs of the flight directors. A volunteer can be assigned by a flight director to be the ship's doctor character, be an alien actor, be second chair (responding to sensor scans, sending messages, etc.), or pretty much anything else the FD wants them to do.
- Programmers – (baby-blue-collared shirts) Develop controls software and provide technical support.

=== Stageworks ===
Stageworks is the content creation group of the space center. This is where the space center's mission visuals and props are created. Volunteers and staff who are proficient in the creative fields are able to be selected to create different aspects. These aspects could be created by the use of Blender, Affinity, Photoshop, Premiere Pro, and other programs.

== Programs and camps ==
The space center offers a variety of programs that provide varying mission lengths and experiences. Continuing the educational aim of the space center, there are field-trip programs for school classes that provide education about science, space, and teamwork/leadership. These programs also offer educational experience missions on the simulators. For the general public, there are also private missions and summer camps. Private missions are available to be reserved in 2 lengths: 2.5-hour and 5-hour missions. These time blocks include time for briefing and training in preparation for an actual mission on the simulator. The space center also used to have overnight camps starting on Friday nights and ending on the following Saturday mornings: all missions were "paused" for the night, campers slept at the space center overnight, and then missions were resumed in the morning. These missions however, are no longer available. They also had Super Saturday camps that provided the same missions as overnight camps but occurred during the day on Saturdays. The Leadership Camp is made for an older audience of ages 15–17. It differs from the other summer camps in that the whole camp is a campaign and every mission is part of a bigger picture. A Leadership Camp may not be flown every summer due to the amount of planning that goes into it, since it runs through multiple days. Summer camps usually happen in one day with a variety of activities from missions to classroom activities and planetarium shows.
