= Western Nevada College =

Multi-campus public college in Nevada, US

Coordinates: 39.186272°N 119.791020°W

- Former name: Western Nevada Community College (1971–2007)
- Type: Public college
- Established: 1971; 55 years ago
- Founder: Jack C. Davis
- Parent institution: Nevada System of Higher Education
- Academic affiliations: Space-grant
- President: J. Kyle Dalpe
- Location: Carson City (Main campus), Fallon, and Minden, Nevada, United States
- Colors: Blue and Yellow
- Mascot: Wildcats
- Website: www.wnc.edu

Western Nevada College (WNC) is a public college with its main campus in Carson City, Nevada, United States. There are additional campuses in Fallon and Minden, and WNC centers in Dayton, Fernley, Hawthorne, Lake Tahoe, Lovelock, Smith Valley and Yerington, as well as degree programs in five correctional institutions. Along with several certificate programs, the college offers a number of different associate and bachelor degrees. As of 2026, WNC had about 4,188 students.

Prior to July 2007, WNC was known as Western Nevada Community College. The name change was approved by the Nevada System of Higher Education Board of Regents in recognition of WNC's ability to grant four-year degrees in a few subjects, though the school's overall focus is still largely related to two-year associates degrees and short-term certifications. WNC is accredited by the Northwest Commission on Colleges and Universities.

WNC is home to the Jack C. Davis Observatory, with three telescopes, a weather station and other scientific devices.

Undergraduate demographics as of Fall 2023
Race and ethnicity	Total
White	52%
Hispanic	31%
Two or more races	6%
Unknown	4%
American Indian/Alaska Native	2%
Asian	2%
Black	2%
Economic diversity
Low-income (Note: The percentage of students who received an income-based federal Pell grant intended for low-income students.)	36%
Affluent (Note: The percentage of students who are a part of the American middle class at the bare minimum.)	64%

== Alumni ==
- Don Gustavson, politician
- John Oceguera, politician
- DJ Peters, baseball player
- Tim Peterson, baseball player
- Braden Shipley, baseball player
