= Community College System of New Hampshire =

- Motto: Where Successful People Get Their Start
- Type: Public
- Chancellor: Mark Rubinstein (2021)
- Students: Over 25,000 annually (combined)
- Location: various cities, New Hampshire, United States
- Website: www.ccsnh.edu

The Community College System of New Hampshire (previously New Hampshire Community Technical Colleges (NHCTC) and prior to that New Hampshire Vocational Technical Colleges (NHVTC)) is an organization of seven public community colleges located throughout New Hampshire. 95% of enrolled students are New Hampshire residents.

The colleges offer over 80 associate degree programs. They also have Project Lead the Way programs where they partner with New Hampshire high schools to allow students to enroll in courses to receive college credits. On January 30, 2008, the Governor and Executive Council unanimously approved changing the names of six member schools. The changes were completed by July 1, 2008.

CCSNH's Dual enrollment program is referred to as Early College, and NH students earn college credits at their high schools and at CCSNH's college campuses.

== Member schools ==
The colleges are located in the following New Hampshire cities:

Location of New Hampshire Community College campuses. Black dots represent sole or flagship campuses. Red dots represent satellite campuses.

Name	Location
Great Bay Community College	Portsmouth (at Portsmouth International Airport at Pease)
Lakes Region Community College	Laconia
Manchester Community College	Manchester
Nashua Community College	Nashua
NHTI – Concord's Community College	Concord
River Valley Community College	Claremont with academic centers in Keene and Lebanon
White Mountains Community College	Berlin with an academic center in Littleton
