= New Hampshire Film and Television Office =

Government agency in the U.S. state of New Hampshire

Agency overview
- Jurisdiction: New Hampshire
- Headquarters: Concord, New Hampshire, United States
- Website: www.visitnh.gov/film

The New Hampshire Film and Television Office (Note: The office is also referred to as the Film Bureau.) is a government agency of the U.S. state of New Hampshire. It is a member of the Association of Film Commissioners International (AFCI). The office existed as early as 1983, but was then dormant for over a decade until being revived in 1998.

The office works to expand business activity and employment throughout the state by acting as a liaison between the film industry and an established network of government agencies, the state's film industry workforce, and local property owners. The office is responsible for location assistance, public relations, and general production support in an effort to broaden the cultural and economic impact of film and television production in the state.
