= New Hampshire Division of Economic Development =

Government agency in the U.S. state of New Hampshire

New Hampshire Division of Economic Development (DED)
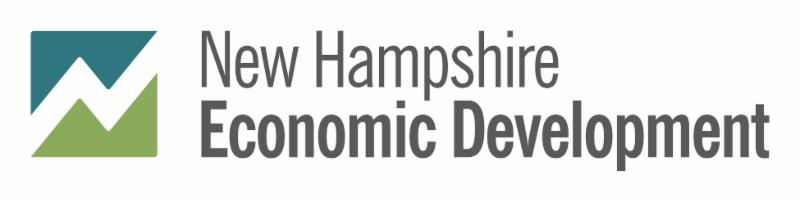

Agency overview
- Formed: 1962
- Jurisdiction: New Hampshire
- Headquarters: 100 North Main Street; Concord, New Hampshire
- Parent agency: New Hampshire Department of Business and Economic Affairs
- Website: www.nheconomy.org

The New Hampshire Division of Economic Development (DED) is a government agency of the U.S. state of New Hampshire. The agency's headquarters are located in Concord.

== History ==
New Hampshire has had a Division of Economic Development since 1962. During the 1960s, the division published vacation guides and placed newspaper advertisements with taglines such as "The New New Hampshire". During the 1970s, the division issued state highway maps and tourist guides. Similar activities are now handled by the state's Division of Travel and Tourism Development.

In July 2017, the Division of Economic Development became part of the newly formed Department of Business and Economic Affairs (DBEA), having previously been part of the state's Department of Resources and Economic Development (DRED).

== Function ==
The division assists businesses looking to move to the state, start in the state, or grow within the state. Activities include assisting businesses in obtaining permits to operate in New Hampshire, and co-working with financial services groups to help businesses expand. The division also operates an Office of International Commerce (OIC).
