= River Valley Community College =

Multi-campus public college in New Hampshire, US

Coordinates: 43°23′56″N 72°19′59″W

- Type: Public community college
- Parent institution: Community College System of New Hampshire
- Academic affiliations: Space-grant
- President: Alfred Williams IV
- Location: Claremont, Keene, and Lebanon, New Hampshire, United States
- Website: www.rivervalley.edu

River Valley Community College (RVCC) is a public community college with campuses in Claremont, Keene, and Lebanon, New Hampshire. It is part of the Community College System of New Hampshire and is accredited by the New England Commission of Higher Education. The college offers over 35 degree and certificate programs.

It was established as the New Hampshire Community Technical College at Claremont in 1968. The Keene Academic Center opened in 2004. The college's third location in Lebanon opened January 2016, in the former Lebanon College building.
