= New Hampshire Department of Business and Economic Affairs =

Government agency in the U.S. state of New Hampshire

New Hampshire Department of Business and Economic Affairs (DBEA)
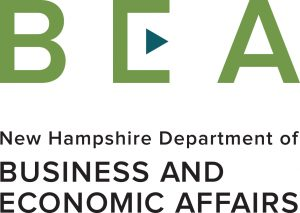

Agency overview
- Formed: July 1, 2017
- Preceding agency: Department of Resources and Economic Development
- Jurisdiction: New Hampshire
- Headquarters: 100 North Main Street; Concord, New Hampshire
- Agency executive: Lucy Lange, Commissioner
- Website: www.dbea.nh.gov

The New Hampshire Department of Business and Economic Affairs (DBEA, sometimes styled as BEA) is a government agency of the U.S. state of New Hampshire. The agency's headquarters are located in Concord.

== History ==
The department was established via legislative act on July 1, 2017, when the state split the former Department of Resources and Economic Development (DRED) into the Department of Business and Economic Affairs (DBEA) and the Department of Natural and Cultural Resources (DNCR).

== Function ==
DBEA's purpose is "enhancing the economic vitality of the State of New Hampshire and promoting it as a destination for domestic and international visitors." DBEA oversees two other state agencies:

- New Hampshire Division of Economic Development
- New Hampshire Division of Travel and Tourism Development

In April 2021, DBEA announced the creation of an Office of Outdoor Recreation Industry Development (ORID), to connect the state's "outdoor assets to broad economic development strategies such as workforce and business recruitment."
