= Manchester Community College (New Hampshire) =

Public college in Manchester, New Hampshire, US

Coordinates: 43°01′09″N 71°29′01″W

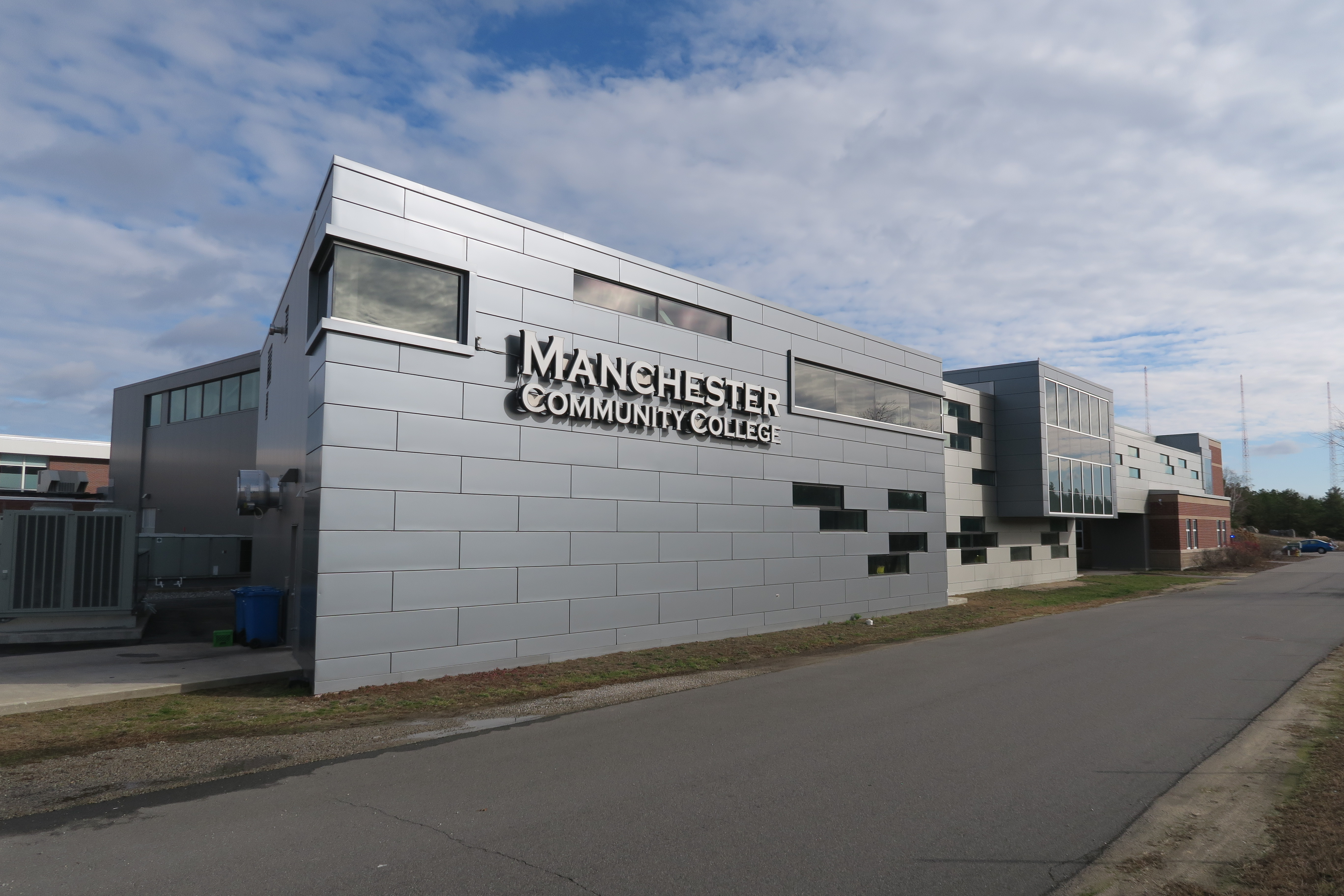
- Former name: New Hampshire Community Technical College
- Motto: Opportunities. For Now ... For Life.
- Type: Public community college
- Established: 1945
- Academic affiliations: Space-grant
- President: Dr. Paul Beaudin
- Location: Manchester, New Hampshire, United States
- Campus: Suburban
- Colors: Green
- Website: www.mccnh.edu

Manchester Community College is a public community college in Manchester, New Hampshire.

== History ==
New Hampshire's system of post-secondary vocational-technical education developed in response to conditions in New Hampshire following the end of World War II. Recognizing that many soldiers, sailors and airmen, among others, would be demobilized and in need of retraining for civilian life, two State Trade Schools were developed. Since that time, the Community College System of New Hampshire has grown to include four colleges comprising seven institutions.

In the early 1980s, the school had a highly visible solar building facing Interstate 293. The building was demolished in 2007 to make way for a new Health Science & Technology building.

The New Hampshire legislature passed a law enabling the Board to increase the number of colleges from four to seven, "uncoupling" campuses that had been administratively merged prior to 2005.

On January 30, 2008, the name changed from New Hampshire Community Technical College at Manchester to Manchester Community College.

== Student body ==
The college enrolls about 3,000 students per semester and offers more than 40 degree and certificate programs as well as workshops and professional development programs. Its facilities include the Center for Academic Planning and Support, Library, instructional labs, an auditorium, a cafeteria, and a full-service Early Childhood Education Lab School.

== Campus ==
Located on 57 acres (23 ha) near the banks of the Merrimack River north of the city center, the Manchester campus offers classes and programs in three major connected buildings, and has ample room for future growth while retaining more than adequate green space and parking.
