= White Mountains Community College =

Community college in New Hampshire, U.S.

Coordinates: 44°30′12″N 71°09′32″W

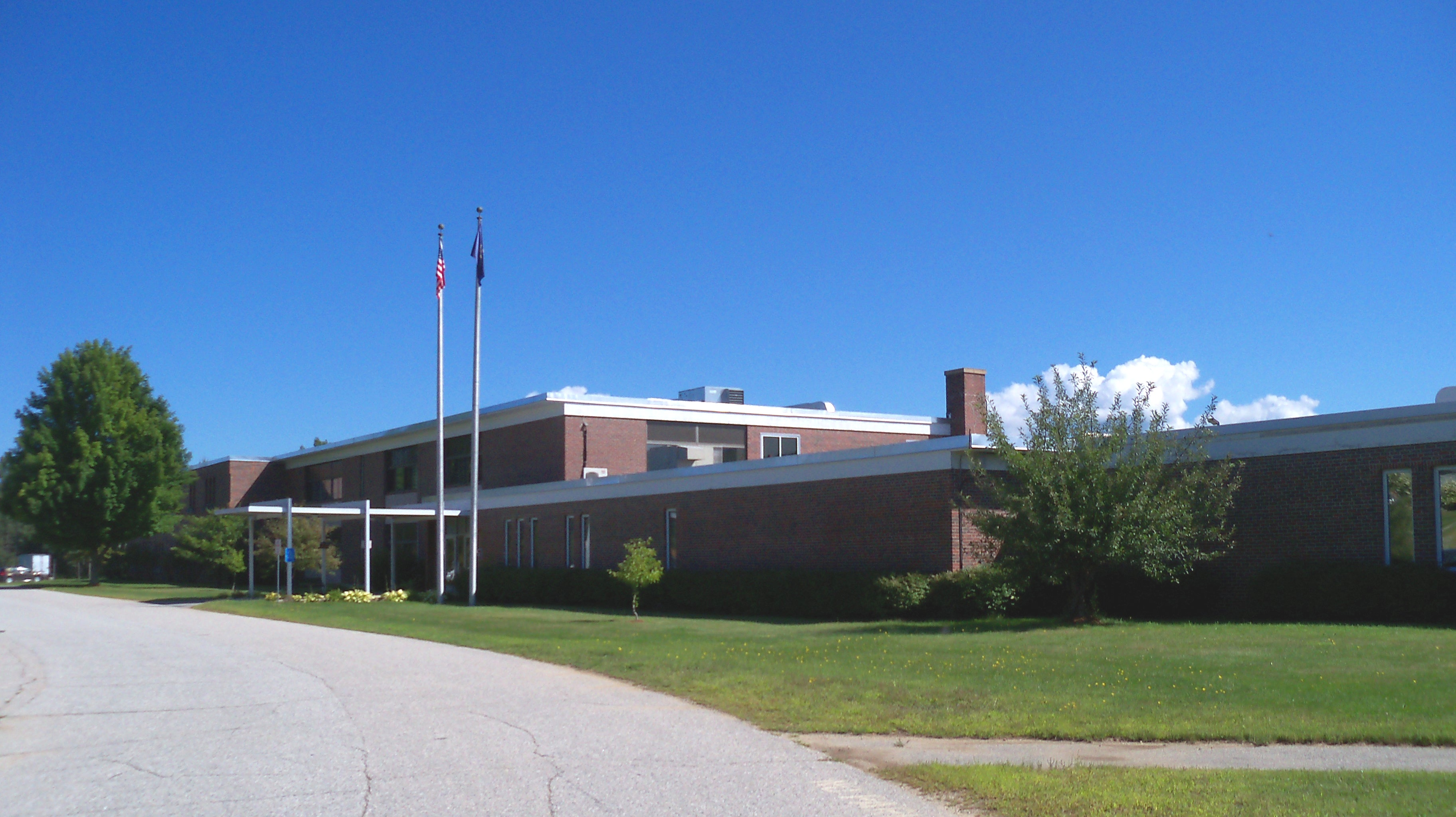
- Main entrance of WMCC in Berlin, New Hampshire
- Motto: Where Successful People Get Their Start
- Type: Public community college
- Established: 1966
- Parent institution: CCSNH
- Academic affiliations: Space-grant
- Location: Berlin and Littleton, United States
- Mascot: Golden Eagle
- Website: www.wmcc.edu

White Mountains Community College (WMCC) is a public community college with its main campus in Berlin, New Hampshire, and academic centers in Littleton and North Conway. It is part of the Community College System of New Hampshire.

== History ==
The college opened in the fall of 1966 as the northernmost campus of the "New Hampshire Vocational Institute", also referred to as the "Berlin Vocational Institute". It has had other names over its history including "Berlin Vocational Technical College" (by 1970, and into the 1990s), "New Hampshire Community Technical College - Berlin" (1996 through mid-2007) and "New Hampshire Community College - Berlin" (only briefly, from mid-2007 to early 2008). The school was renamed as "White Mountains Community College" in 2008 as part of a more general renaming of the state's community colleges.

The Littleton center opened in 2009, followed by the North Conway location in 2016.
