= New Hampshire Banking Department =

Government agency in the U.S. state of New Hampshire

Agency overview
- Formed: 1837
- Jurisdiction: New Hampshire
- Headquarters: 53 Regional Drive; Concord, New Hampshire
- Employees: 51 (June 2020)
- Agency executives: Emelia A.S. Galdieri, Bank Commissioner; vacant, Deputy Bank Commissioner
- Website: www.nh.gov/banking

The New Hampshire Banking Department is a state agency of the U.S. state of New Hampshire, headquartered in Concord. The department supervises all state-chartered financial institutions including commercial banks, merchant banks, and credit unions. As of June 2020, there were 61 charted institutions with a total of 329 branches in the state. The department has three divisions: Banking and Trust Division, Consumer Credit Division, and Office of the Legal Counsel.

The department dates to 1837, when Isaac Hill, the state's 16th governor, approved the state's first bank commissioners. Since 1925, the department has been led by a single commissioner, authorized under New Hampshire Revised Statutes Annotated (NH RSA) Chapter 383. The commissioner is appointed to a six-year term by the Governor of New Hampshire with approval of the Governor's Council.
