= Lakes Region Community College =

Public college in Laconia, New Hampshire, US

Coordinates: 43°30′26″N 71°27′45″W

- Type: Public community college
- Parent institution: Community College System of New Hampshire
- Academic affiliations: Space-grant
- President: Patrick Cate
- Students: 1,171
- Location: Laconia, New Hampshire, United States
- Nickname: Waves
- Website: www.lrcc.edu

Lakes Region Community College (LRCC) is a public community college in Laconia, New Hampshire. Located in the heart of New Hampshire's Lakes Region, it is part of the Community College System of New Hampshire.

== Academics ==
The college offers 80+ associate degree and certificate programs in fields such as nursing, fire technology, liberal arts, interdisciplinary studies, accounting, early childhood education, energy services, graphic design, culinary arts, automotive, and marine technology.

== History ==
The institution was established as Laconia College in 1967. The main campus underwent a physical expansion in 1980, adding the Robert H. Turner wing to its facility. In September 2005, the Center for Arts and Technology was completed and is home to Computer Technologies, Electrical Technologies, Fine Arts, and Graphic Design and Printing Technology. In September 2013, LRCC opened the state-of-the-art Health and Science Building (attached to the Center for Arts and Technology) which added 24,000 square feet (2,200 m^{2}) of usable space. The new Health and Science Building houses Fire Science, Nursing, Science laboratories, and new student space. There are four new modern science and hi-tech Nursing labs. The new building also houses two new Fire Science labs, faculty offices, and a 140-seat mini-auditorium.
