= New Hampshire Real Estate Commission =

Government agency in the U.S. state of New Hampshire

Agency overview
- Jurisdiction: New Hampshire
- Headquarters: Capitol Street; Concord, New Hampshire
- Agency executive: Steven F. Hyde, Chair
- Parent agency: New Hampshire Office of Professional Licensure and Certification
- Website: www.oplc.nh.gov/nh-real-estate-commission

The New Hampshire Real Estate Commission is the body in charge of real estate licensing in the U.S. state of New Hampshire. The commission also investigates alleged ethics violations by real estate agents and brokers in the state, and punishes them if warranted. The commission's board consists of two licensed real estate brokers, one licensed real estate salesperson, one attorney, and one member of the public.

The commission is located on the fourth floor of the State House Annex just south of the State House on Capitol Street in Concord, New Hampshire. Administratively, the commission operates within the state's Office of Professional Licensure and Certification.
