= NHTI – Concord's Community College =

Public college in Concord, New Hampshire, US

Coordinates: 43°13′23″N 71°31′54″W

- Motto: Explore Your Possibilities.
- Type: Public community college
- Established: 1961
- Parent institution: Community College System of New Hampshire
- Academic affiliations: Space-grant
- Location: Concord, New Hampshire, United States
- Campus: 240 acres (97 ha); Suburban
- Colors: Maroon and Gold
- Mascot: Lynx
- Website: www.nhti.edu

NHTI – Concord's Community College is a public community college in Concord, New Hampshire. It is part of the Community College System of New Hampshire and is accredited by the New England Association of Schools and Colleges. The college, which opened in 1965, was known as New Hampshire Technical Institute until 2007, when its current name was adopted to reflect its growth as a community college with broad offerings in both technical and general education.

== History ==
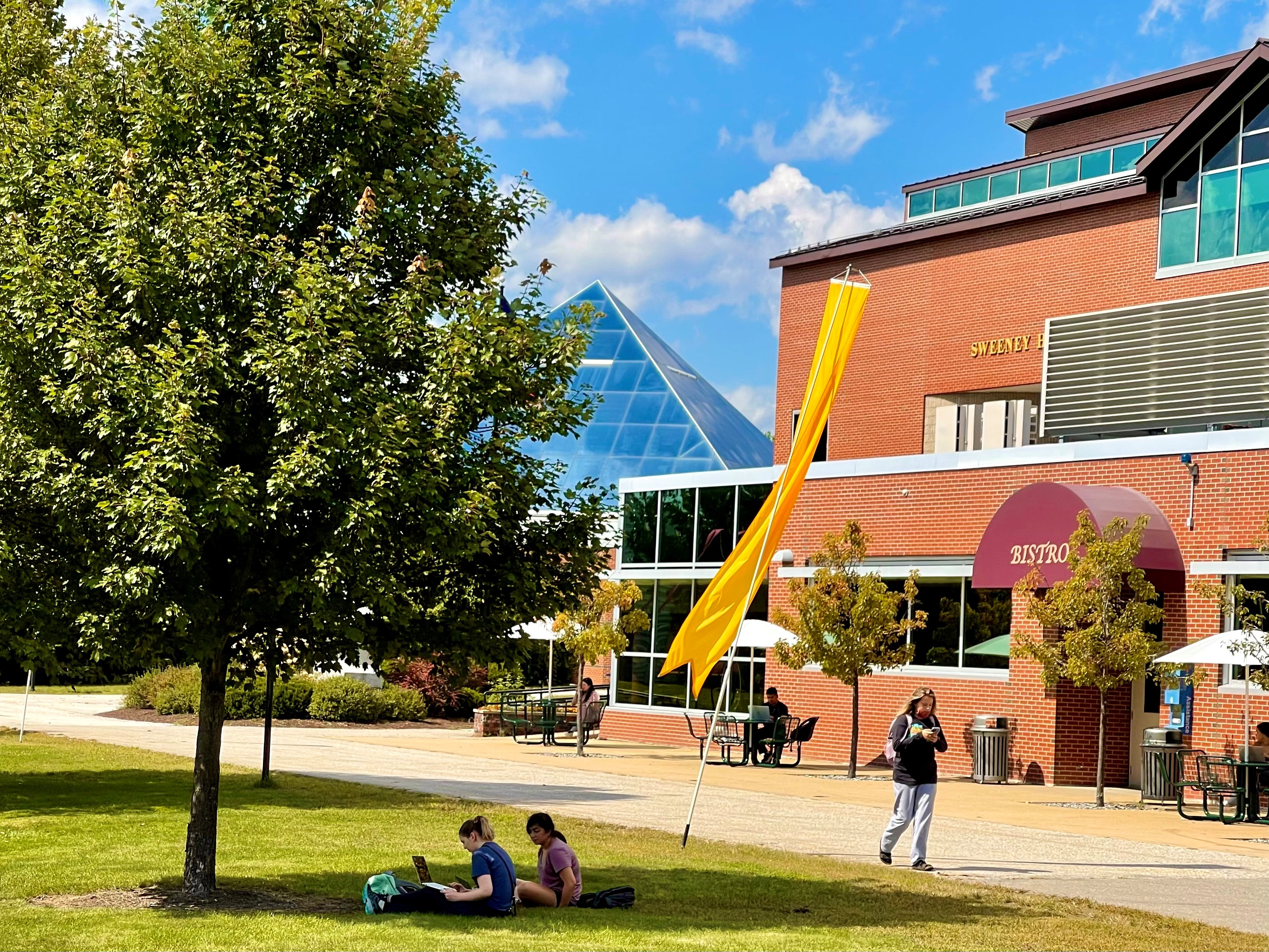
NHTI's campus, featuring Sweeney Hall and the Bistro dining option, during Summer semester.

The college's roots and its former name comes from post-World War II veterans' training programs in Manchester and Portsmouth, New Hampshire. However, neither of these institutions were accredited colleges.

The college was created by legislation passed in the New Hampshire General Court in 1961. The legislation followed several years of investigation and exploration by a special committee. The group took special guidance from the two-year college system then operating in North Carolina. Two-year colleges were an innovation in New Hampshire. The legislation created six colleges and led to an active search for campus sites in Concord, Nashua, Manchester, Portsmouth, Claremont, Laconia and Berlin. Only the Concord location retained the NHTI designation; the six others were named New Hampshire Vocational Technical College at [name of city].

== Academics ==
NHTI offers 45 associate degree programs and 55 certificate programs of study, many of which are able to be completed completely online. Individual majors are available within six programs. Majors range from business to engineering to criminal justice, and also include a wide range of healthcare options, such as nursing, dental hygiene, radiology, and paramedic training.

The robotics and automation engineering technology (RAET) program was added in 2013 under the support of a $19.97 million federal grant, with the first class of students graduating in May 2015. This program focuses on the usage of industrial robots in various industries, as well as the use of PLC units in mass production. It additionally includes a course on lean manufacturing, one of the most advanced and efficient ways of manufacturing, invented by Taiichi Ohno.

Some of the students who graduate from NHTI choose to transfer to another four-year institution to continue their education. NHTI offers a variety of transfer agreements with various universities that accept most to all of the credits earned at NHTI.

NHTI offers credits for high schools around New Hampshire. Specific classes taken at the high school level can be accredited towards an associate degree.

== Campus ==
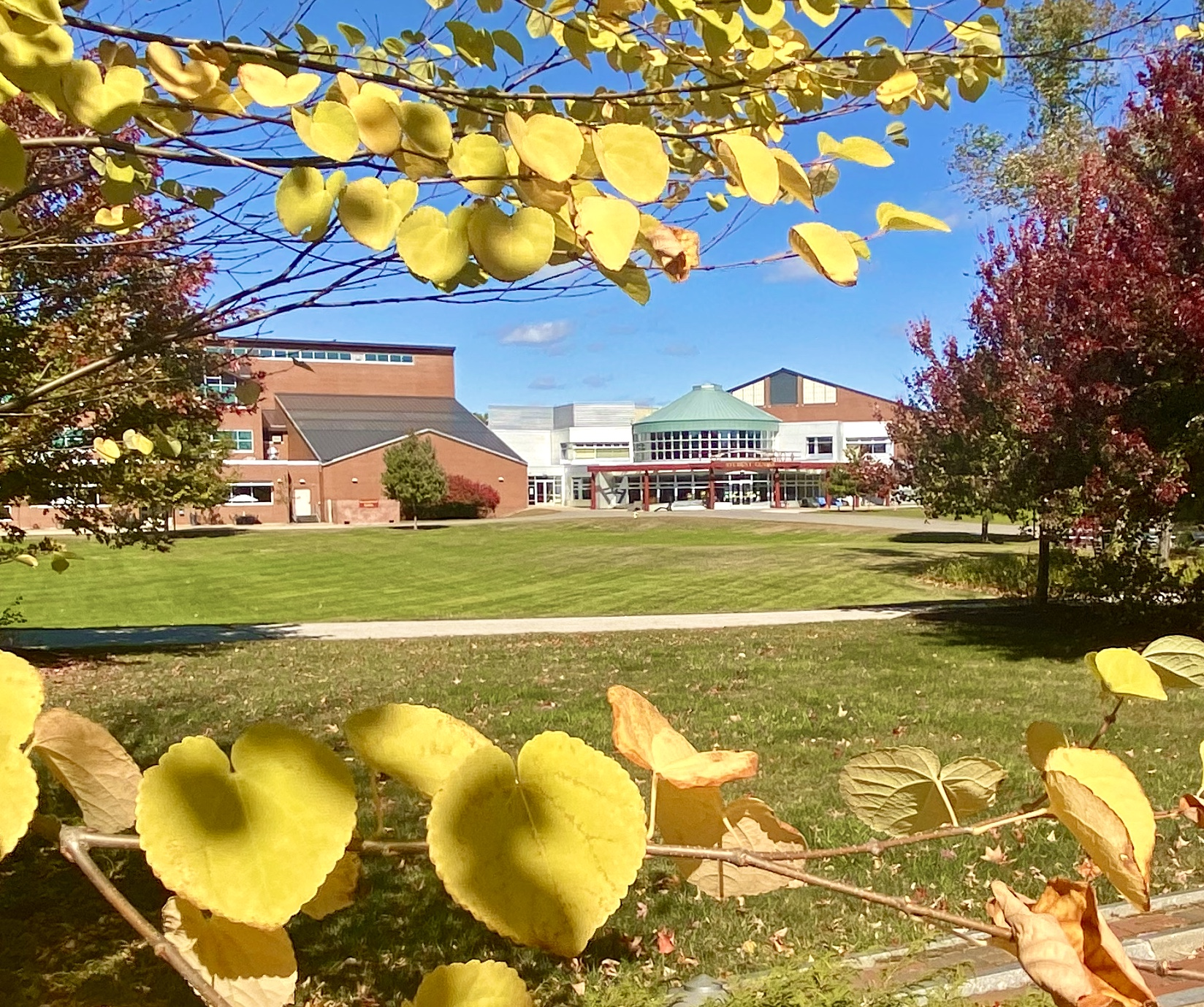
NHTI's campus during the Fall semester.

NHTI's main campus in Concord covers 240 acres (97 ha), includes three residence halls, and is also home to the New Hampshire Police Standards and Training Academy, the McAuliffe-Shepard Discovery Center, and the offices for the Community College System of New Hampshire.
