= McAuliffe-Shepard Discovery Center =

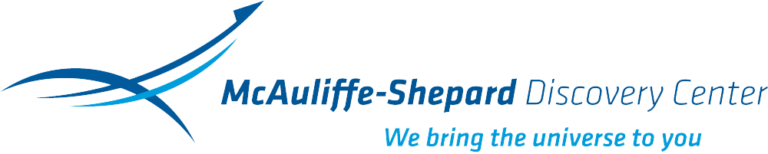

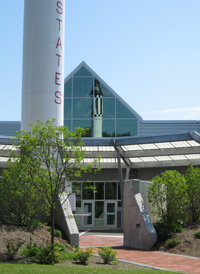
- McAuliffe-Shepard Discovery Center

- Location within New Hampshire McAuliffe-Shepard Discovery Center (the United States)
- Established: 1990
- Location: Concord, New Hampshire
- Coordinates: 43.224202°N 71.532469°W
- Type: Science museum
- Collection size: Planetarium, replica Mercury-Redstone Launch Vehicle
- Visitors: 50,000 annually
- Director: Melissa Edwards
- Curator: Amber Woods
- Public transit access: Concord Area Transport
- Website: www.starhop.com

The McAuliffe-Shepard Discovery Center is a science museum located in Concord, New Hampshire, United States, next door to the NHTI campus. The museum is dedicated to Christa McAuliffe, the Concord High School social studies teacher selected by NASA out of over 11,000 applicants to be the first teacher in space, and Alan Shepard, the Derry, New Hampshire, native and Navy test pilot who became the first American in space and one of only twelve human beings to walk on the Moon. The Discovery Center's stated mission is to inspire new generations to explore space, through engaging, artful, and entertaining activities focused on astronomy, aviation, Earth and space science.

The 45,000-square-foot (4,200 m^{2}) museum offers 20,000 square feet (1,900 m^{2}) of interactive science and engineering exhibits, outdoor exhibits including a full-sized replica of a Mercury-Redstone rocket, a full-dome digital planetarium, an observatory, science store, portable digital planetarium and a full complement of on- and off-site educational programs.

== History ==
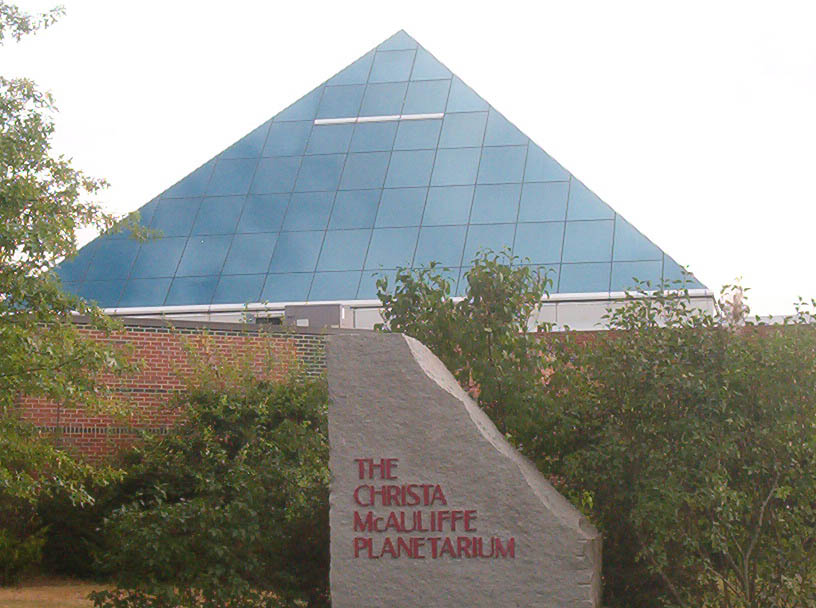
The Christa McAuliffe Planetarium, the original portion of the Discovery Center, as pictured in 2002

The McAuliffe-Shepard Discovery Center began as a stand-alone planetarium serving as the official State of New Hampshire memorial to Christa McAuliffe, opening in June 1990 as the Christa McAuliffe Planetarium. In 2001 it became the official state memorial to Admiral Alan Shepard as well, after his death in 1998. It is one of two public planetaria in northern New England, along with the Lyman Spitzer Jr. Planetarium in St. Johnsbury, Vermont.

In 2009, the organization more than quadrupled in size when it added a science museum focused on astronomy, aviation, Earth and space science; it was renamed the McAuliffe-Shepard Discovery Center. The grand opening was on March 6, 2009.

After 22 years as a State of New Hampshire agency, on January 1, 2013, the McAuliffe-Shepard Discovery Center separated from the state and became a private sector nonprofit operation. The State of New Hampshire retained ownership of the facility and grounds, but engaged in a long-term lease with the new nonprofit operator, the McAuliffe-Shepard Discovery Center Corporation.

In 2019, the Discovery Center served as one of the primary settings of the independent film First Signal produced by New England–based company The Ashton Times.

== Exhibits ==
The Discovery Center's exhibits include a 1956 XF8U-2 jet on loan from the National Naval Aviation Museum, 1:1 scale models of the Mercury capsule inside and Mercury-Redstone outside, exhibits on planetary science, lunar exploration, Space Shuttle exhibits including a simulator and scale models, aviation, weather, science fiction toys and memorabilia including the suit worn by Grace Lee Whitney in the 1979 film Star Trek: The Motion Picture, and chairs from Geordi La Forge's room in Star Trek: The Next Generation; in addition, the Discovery Center brings in three traveling exhibits annually on science and engineering.

The McAuliffe-Shepard Discovery Center operates NASA's Educator Resource Center in New Hampshire and is a New Hampshire Space Grant institution.

== Programs ==
The McAuliffe-Shepard Discovery Center's programs include its annual "Aerospacefest" festival in the fall, stargazing with the New Hampshire Astronomical Society along with a public science talk and planetarium show the first Friday of every month, a monthly hands-on science exploration program for teens, monthly Scouting programs, Space Grant Summer STEM Camp College Internships, homeschool classes and summer camps.
