= Jack C. Davis Observatory =

Observatory in Nevada, US

- Organization: Western Nevada College
- Observatory code: Carson City, Nevada
- Location: Nevada, United States
- Coordinates: 39.1857°N 119.7964°W
- Altitude: 1,534 meters (5,033 ft)
- Established: 2003
- Website: Jack C. Davis Observatory

The Jack C. Davis Observatory is an astronomical observatory at Western Nevada College in Carson City, Nevada. The facility has three telescopes: two 0.4 m (16 in) reflecting telescopes and one 0.25 m (9.8 in) reflector. One telescope is equipped with a spectrograph. Outside the building, a 0.12 m (4.7 in) refractor has been installed under a robotic dome and is used for studying sunspots. All of the telescopes are equipped with cameras, and are connected to the Internet so large groups can access images from remote locations.

A Campbell Scientific research-grade weather station is installed outside the observatory. The solar-powered instrument collects weather data and sends it to the Desert Research Institute in Reno, Nevada, for analysis and on-line publication. The Planetary Walkway connects the main campus with the observatory. Lining the walkway are massive sandstone monuments created by artistic inmates from the Nevada State Prison at the prison's old quarry. The stones feature carved images of the planets, along with information about the planet and a dedication to the donors.

The Western Nevada Astronomical Society is an observing group affiliated with Western Nevada College and the Jack C. Davis Observatory. The WNAS is dedicated to supporting the astronomical community through education, social functions, and service.

The observatory was named after the founder and first president of Western Nevada College.

== See also ==
- List of observatories
