= Nashua Community College =

Public college in Nashua, New Hampshire, US

Coordinates: 42°47′42″N 71°31′25″W

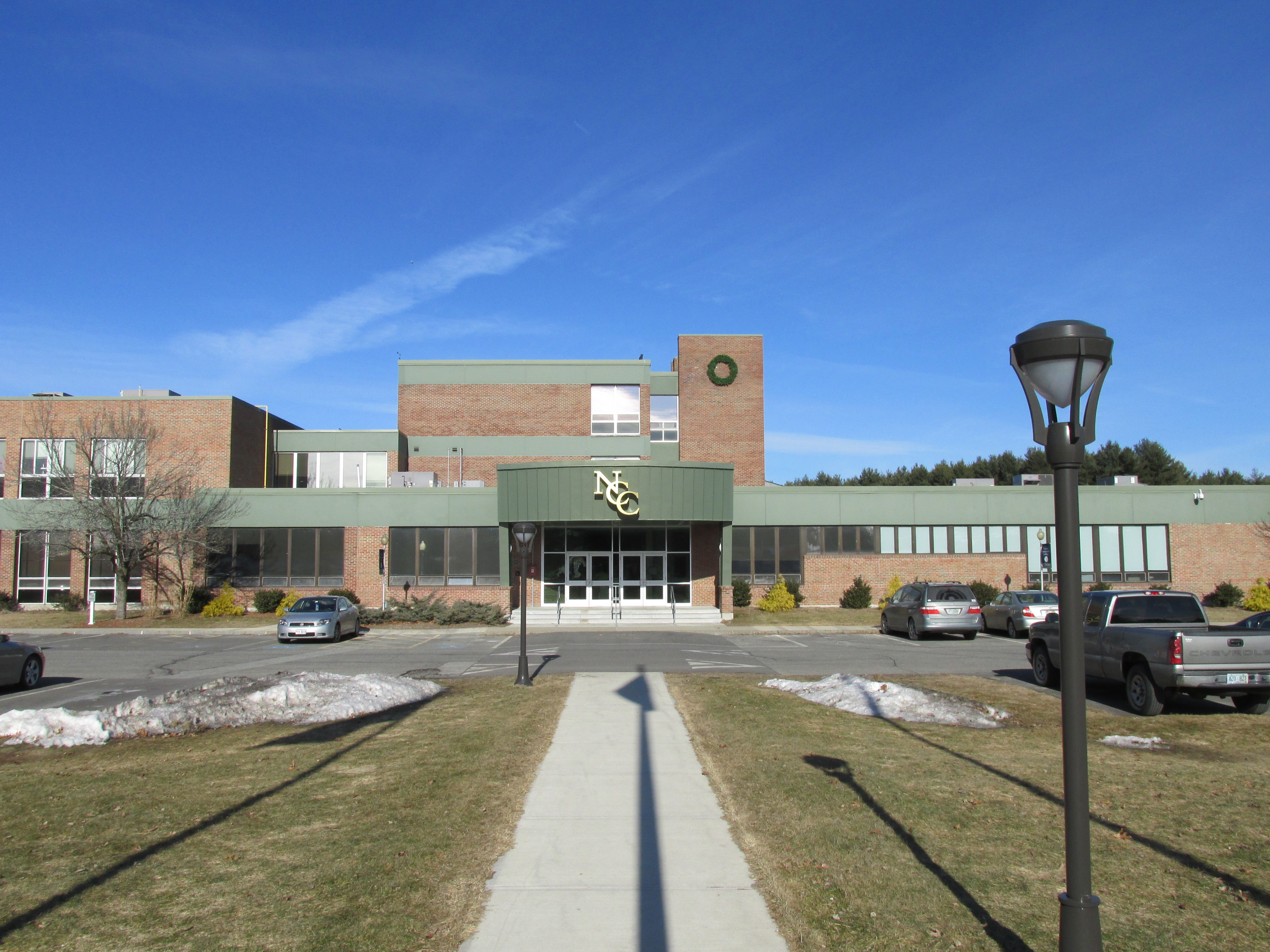
- Nashua Community College
- Former names: New Hampshire Community Technical College, New Hampshire Vocational Technical College
- Type: Public community college
- Established: 1970
- Parent institution: Community College System of New Hampshire
- Academic affiliations: Space-grant
- President: James Keane
- Location: Nashua, New Hampshire, United States
- Campus: Suburban
- Colors: Navy Blue, Privilege Green, White
- Mascot: Jaguars
- Website: www.nashuacc.edu
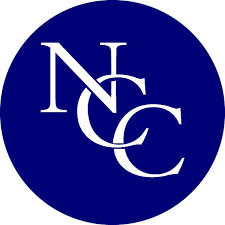

Nashua Community College (NCC) is a public community college in Nashua, New Hampshire. It is part of the Community College System of New Hampshire. Enrollment was 1,366 students in fall 2024, 75% part-time and 25% full time.

== History ==
The present campus was completed in 1970 to designs by Manchester architects Koehler & Isaak.

== Academics ==
NCC offers 35 associate degree programs and 22 certificate programs.
