= List of people from New Hampshire =

State flag of New Hampshire

Location of New Hampshire in the United States

The following are people who were born, raised, or who gained significant prominence for living in U.S. state of New Hampshire:

== Aeronautics and aviation ==
- Jay C. Buckey (born 1956), astronaut
- Michael Durant (born 1961), pilot, native
- Thaddeus Lowe (1832–1913), 19th-century balloonist, native
- Christa McAuliffe (1948–1986), teacher, astronaut
- Lee Morin (born 1952), astronaut, native
- Richard A. Searfoss (1956–2018), astronaut
- Alan Shepard (1923–1998), astronaut; first American in space, native

== Arts and literature ==
- Eric Aho (born 1966), painter
- Thomas Bailey Aldrich (1836–1907), poet, novelist, travel writer
- Minnie Willis Baines (1845–unknown), author, native
- Russell Banks (born 1940), novelist
- Lucy Barnes (1780–1809), writer, native
- Amy Beach (1867–1944), composer, native
- Brian Sidney Bembridge (born 1973), artist, designer, native
- Adelaide George Bennett (1848–1911), teacher, poet, native
- Henry Ames Blood (1836–1900), poet, playwright, native
- Philip Booth (1925–2007), poet
- Helen L. Bostwick (1826–1907), author, poet, native
- Ben Bradlee Jr. (born 1948), journalist, author, native
- Dan Brown (born 1964), novelist, native
- Emma Elizabeth Brown (1847–unknown), writer, artist, native
- Bill Bryson (born 1951), author, resident, 1995–2003
- Cathy Burnham Martin (born 1954), author, actress, native
- Lisa Carver (born 1968), writer
- Luella J. B. Case (1807–1858), author, hymnist, native
- Willa Cather (1873–1947), novelist
- Matt Chandler (born 1972), children's book author
- Charles Carleton Coffin (1823–1896), American Civil War correspondent
- George Condo, artist
- David Cote (born 1969), playwright, opera librettist, theater critic, native
- E. E. Cummings (1894–1962), poet
- Decap (born 1984), artist and record producer
- Joseph Dennie (1768–1812), 18th-century writer
- Tomie dePaola (1934–2020), children's book author
- Kevin Eastman (born 1962), comic book writer, co-creator of Teenage Mutant Ninja Turtles
- Richard Eberhart (1904–2005), poet
- Clayton Emery (born 1953), author
- Lydia Mary Fay (1804–1878), missionary, writer, translator, native
- James T. Fields (1817–1881), publisher, editor, poet
- Lisa Anne Fletcher (1844–1905), poet, correspondent
- Barbara Newhall Follett (1914–disappeared 1939), writer, native
- Ron Fortier (born 1946), comic book writer
- Daniel Chester French (1850–1931), sculptor, native
- Robert Frost (1874–1963), poet
- Horace Greeley (1811–1872), journalist, native
- Wayne Green (1922–2013), publisher, native
- Sarah Josepha Hale (1788–1879), editor, writer, author known for the nursery rhyme "Mary Had a Little Lamb"
- Donald Hall (1928–2018), poet
- Mary R. Platt Hatch (1848–1905), poet, novelist, short story writer, native
- Grace Webster Hinsdale (1832–1902), author, native
- Nicholas Hondrogen (1952–2007), painter, photographer, sculptor
- Dan Hurlin (born 1955), poet, literary critic, native
- John Irving (born 1942), novelist, native
- Carrie Jones, novelist
- Elizabeth Orton Jones (1910–2005), illustrator
- Jane Kenyon (1947–1995), poet
- Heather King (born 1952), blogger
- Maxine Kumin (1925–2014), poet
- Peter Laird (born 1954), comic book writer, co-creator of Teenage Mutant Ninja Turtles
- Dudley Leavitt (1772–1851), publisher
- Minnie Mary Lee (1826–1903), author, native
- Alan Lelchuk (born 1938), novelist, editor
- Martha Perry Lowe (1829–1902), poet, activist, native
- Edward MacDowell (1860–1908), pianist, composer
- Mary Stuart James MacMurphy (1846–1934), teacher, author, native
- Joyce Maynard (born 1953), novelist
- Jim McDermott (born 1960), illustrator
- Larkin Goldsmith Mead (1835–1910), sculptor, native
- Grace Metalious (1924–1964), novelist
- Bob Montana (1920–1975), illustrator of Archie comics
- Jules Olitski (1922–2007), painter
- P.J. O'Rourke (1947–2022), political satirist and journalist
- Maxfield Parrish (1870–1966), painter
- John Perkins (born 1945), author, native
- Mary Elizabeth Perley (1863–unknown), educator, author, native
- Jodi Picoult (born 1966), author
- Fanny Runnells Poole (1863–1940), writer, book reviewer, native
- Eleanor H. Porter (1868–1920), novelist
- Edna Dean Proctor (1829–1823), poet, native
- Melinda Rankin (1811–1888), missionary, writer, native
- Augustus Saint-Gaudens (1848–1907), sculptor
- J. D. Salinger (1919–2010), novelist – lived in Cornish for several decades
- Charles Simic (born 1938), poet
- Katherine Call Simonds (1865–1955), musician, singer, composer, author, native
- Martha Pearson Smith (1836–1912), poet, musician, activist, native
- Armstrong Sperry (1897–1976), children's book author, resident 1941–1976
- Betsey Ann Stearns (1830–1914), inventor, school founder, writer, native
- Mark Steyn (born 1959), political commentator
- Celia Thaxter (1835–1894), poet
- Lydia H. Tilton (1839–1915), educator, activist, journalist, poet, native
- Clara Augusta Jones Trask (1839–1905), writer, native
- Adelaide Cilley Waldron (1843–1909), writer, editor, native
- Adam Warren (born 1967), comic book writer/artist
- Brady Watt, producer, bass player, and bandleader
- Harriet E. Wilson (1825–1900), 19th-century novelist
- Caroline Marshall Woodward (1828–1890), author, native
- Mary Parker Woodworth (1849–1919), writer, native
- Augusta Harvey Worthen (1823–1910), educator, author, native

== Athletes and sports figures ==
- Victoria Arlen (born 1994), Paralympian swimmer, ESPN personality (Exeter)
- Aaron Baddeley (born 1981), professional golfer (Lebanon)
- Kerry Bascom (born 1969), women's basketball player (Epping)
- Jane Blalock (born 1945), professional golfer (Portsmouth)
- Ernest Blood (1872–1955), men's basketball coach (Manchester)
- Matt Bonner (born 1980), National Basketball Association player – San Antonio Spurs (Concord)
- John Bosa (born 1964), NFL football player Miami Dolphins (Keene)
- Dunbar Bostwick (1908–2006), Olympic ice hockey player (Concord)
- Kent Carlson (born 1962), NHL ice hockey player (Concord)
- Chris Carpenter (born 1975), Major League Baseball player – Toronto Blue Jays-St. Louis Cardinals (Raymond)
- Ben Cherington (born 1974), professional baseball executive, general manager of the Boston Red Sox
- Bruce Cunliffe (1925–1989), Olympic ice hockey player (Keene)
- Charlie Davies (born 1986), Major League Soccer player – D.C. United (Manchester)
- Dangerous Danny Davis (born 1956), professional wrestling referee and wrestler
- Matt Duffy (born 1991), Major League Baseball player – Tampa Bay Rays (Salem)
- Tricia Dunn-Luoma (born 1974), Olympic ice hockey player (Derry)
- Chad Eaton (born 1972), National Football League defensive tackle (Exeter)
- Eva Fabian (born 1993), American-Israeli world champion swimmer (Keene)
- Mark Fayne (born 1987), NHL ice hockey player – New Jersey Devils (Nashua)
- Carlton Fisk (born 1947), Major League Baseball catcher – Boston Red Sox (grew up in Charlestown)
- Mike Flanagan (1951–2011), Major League Baseball pitcher – Baltimore Orioles (Manchester)
- Brian Foster (born 1987), professional ice hockey player (Pembroke)
- Sam Fuld (born 1981), Major League Baseball player and Philadelphia Phillies general manager – Oakland A's (Durham)
- Rich Gale (born 1954), Major League Baseball pitcher – Kansas City Royals (Littleton)
- Jeff Giuliano (born 1979), professional ice hockey player – Iserlohn Roosters (Nashua)
- Jesse Guilford (1895–1962), amateur golfer (Manchester)
- Kirk Hanefeld (born 1956), professional golfer (Claremont)
- Jay Heaps (born 1976), former professional soccer player and current soccer manager – New England Revolution (Nashua)
- James H. Horne (1874–1959), athletic director and coach at Indiana University (Berlin)
- Jed Hoyer (born 1973), executive vice-president and general manager of the Chicago Cubs
- Bill Jackowski (1914–1996), MLB umpire
- Chip Kelly (born 1963), NFL and college football head coach – Philadelphia Eagles, San Francisco 49ers (Dover)
- Katie King-Crowley (born 1975), Olympic ice hockey player (Salem)
- Scotty Lago (born 1987), snowboarder (Seabrook)
- Greg Landry (born 1946), NFL quarterback (Nashua)
- Paul LaPolice (born 1970), Canadian Football League coach (Nashua)
- Jeff Locke (born 1987), Major League Baseball player – Pittsburgh Pirates (Redstone)
- Hunter Long (born 1998), NFL tight end (Exeter)
- Ben Lovejoy (born 1984), NHL ice hockey player (Concord)
- Hubie McDonough (born 1963), NHL ice hockey player (Manchester)
- Jack McGowan (1930–2001), professional golfer (Concord)
- Justin McIsaac (born 1978), professional wrestler
- Freddy Meyer (born 1981), ice hockey player – Modo Hockey (Sanbornville)
- Bode Miller (born 1977), alpine ski racer (Easton)
- Bill Moisan (1925–2010), Major League Baseball pitcher – Chicago Cubs (Newton)
- John Morton (born 1946), Olympic biathlon skier (Walpole)
- Tara Mounsey (born 1978), gold medalist at 1998 Winter Olympics (Concord)
- Josh Owens (born 1988), basketball player for Hapoel Tel Aviv of the Israeli Basketball Premier League
- Chad Paronto (born 1975), baseball player (Woodsville)
- Penny Pitou (born 1938), Olympic alpine skier silver medalist (Gilford and Laconia)
- Deron Quint (born 1976), NHL ice hockey player (Durham)
- Kendall Reyes (born 1989), American football defensive end (Nashua)
- Jon Rheault (born 1986), professional ice hockey player (Deering)
- Brandon Rogers (born 1982), professional ice hockey player (Rochester)
- Red Rolfe (1908–1969), Major League Baseball third baseman, manager and Yale coach (Penacook)
- Kevin Romine (born 1961), utility outfielder in Major League Baseball (Exeter)
- Jeff Serowik (born 1967), NHL ice hockey player (Manchester)
- Leanne Smith (born 1987), alpine skier (Conway)
- Darius Songaila (born 1978), Lithuanian professional basketball player (attended school in New Hampton)
- Matt Taven (born 1985), professional wrestler (Derry)
- Birdie Tebbetts (1912–1999), Major League Baseball player and manager (Nashua)
- Bob Tewksbury (born 1960), Major League Baseball pitcher (Concord)
- Jenny Thompson (born 1973), swimmer, 12-time Olympic medalist (Dover)
- Paul Thompson (born 1988), NHL ice hockey player (Derry)
- Triple H (born 1969), professional wrestler (Nashua)
- Harold Weber (1882–1933), Olympic golfer (Littleton)
- Bob Whitcher (1917–1997), Major League Baseball pitcher – Boston Braves (Berlin)
- Stan Williams (1936–2021), Major League Baseball pitcher (Enfield)
- Brian Wilson (born 1982), Major League Baseball relief pitcher – San Francisco Giants (Londonderry)

== Business people ==
- Richard and Maurice McDonald (1909–1998 and 1902–1971 respectively), founders of original McDonald's restaurant and franchised several of the other early locations
- Herbert Archer "H.A." Richardson (1852–1942), timber and shipping magnate
- Betsey Ann Stearns (1830–1914), inventor

== Criminals ==
- Lisa Biron (born 1969), child molester
- Carl Drega (1935–1997), killer of state troopers, native
- Brian Dugan (born 1956), rapist and serial killer, native
- Samuel Green (1796–1822), serial killer and robber, native
- H.H. Holmes (1861–1896), serial killer of 1893, native
- Linda Kasabian (1949–2023), member of Manson family
- Adam Lanza (1992-2012), school shooter, native
- Daniel Maldonado (born c. 1979), Al-Shabaab terrorist, native
- Dennis Moran (1982–2013), computer hacker
- Richard Paul Pavlick (1887–1975), stalked John F. Kennedy, native
- Terry Peder Rasmussen (1943–2010), serial killer
- Pamela Smart (born 1967), convicted murderer, native
- Forbes Smiley (born 1956), thief of rare maps, found guilty and sentenced to 42 months in prison
- Henry Tufts (1748–1831), 18th century thief, native

== Educators ==
- Samuel Colcord Bartlett (1817–1898), Dartmouth president
- Richard Lederer (born 1938), former St. Paul's School English teacher; author of Anguished English
- Christa McAuliffe (1948–1986), first teacher in space, killed aboard the Space Shuttle Challenger launch

== Entertainment ==
=== Actors and actresses ===
- Bradford Anderson (born 1979), native
- Sam Ayers, native
- Richard Backus (born 1945), native
- Jane Badler (born 1953), native
- Wilson Bethel (born 1984), native
- Peter Bonerz (born 1938)
- James Broderick (1927–1982), native
- Gordon Clapp (born 1948), native
- Patience Cleveland (1931–2004)
- Lew Cody (1884–1934)
- Andy Comeau (born 1970), native
- Zack Conroy (born 1985), native
- Eliza Coupe (born 1981), native
- Matt Czuchry (born 1977), native
- Stephen Dunham (1964–2012)
- Dustin Farnum (1874–1929), native
- Hallie Foote (born 1950)
- Phoebe Foster (1896–1975), native
- Pamela Gidley (1965–2018)
- Michael Graziadei
- Randy Harrison (born 1977), native
- Sam Huntington (born 1982), native
- Jean Kasem (born 1954), native
- William Kendis (1916–1980), native
- Thomas Kopache (born 1945), native
- Walter Long (1879–1952), native
- Dorothy Loudon (1925–2003)
- Kenneth MacKenna (1899–1962), native
- Mandy Moore (born 1984), native
- Carrie-Anne Moss
- Mike O'Malley (born 1966)
- Sandeep Parikh (born 1980), native
- Maggi Parker (born 1927), native
- Keri Lynn Pratt (born 1978), native
- Perrey Reeves (born 1970), native
- Chris Romano (born 1978), native
- Adam Sandler (born 1966)
- John Shea (born 1949), native
- Laura Silverman (born 1966), native
- Christopher Stone (1942–1995), native
- Ilene Woods (1929–2010), native

=== Comedians and humorists ===
- Jay Chanoine (born c. 1985)
- Ronny Chieng (born 1985)
- Jamie Kaler (born 1964), native
- Josh Meyers (born 1976), brother of Seth Meyers
- Seth Meyers (born 1973), native; brother of Josh Meyers
- Sarah Silverman (born 1970), native

=== Internet personalities ===
- Adam22 (born 1983), a.k.a. Adam John Grandmaison, native
- Ludwig Ahgren (born 1995), native

=== Models ===
- Mia Tyler (born 1978), native

=== Musicians ===
- Gaston Allaire (1916–2011), native
- GG Allin (1956–1993), native
- Dale Bozzio (born 1955), member, Missing Persons
- Mark Brunswick (1902–1971)
- Daniel Cartier (born 1969)
- Charlie Clouser (born 1963), native
- Connie Converse (1924–disappeared 1974), native
- Brad Delp (1951–2007), member, Boston
- Ronnie James Dio (1942–2010), native
- Julie Dubela (born 1991)
- Sully Erna (born 1968), member, Godsmack
- Betty George (1926–2007), native
- Lyman Heath (1804–1870), native
- Gary Hoey (born 1960)
- Ray LaMontagne (born 1973), native
- Tommy Makem (1932–2007)
- Mandy Moore (born 1984), native
- Bill Morrissey (1951–2011)
- Eddie Mottau (born 1943), guitarist
- Rod Picott (born 1964)
- Patricia Racette (born 1965), opera singer, native
- Tom Rush (born 1941), native
- Joe Seiders (born 1980), member, The New Pornographers
- Will Sheff (born 1976), member, Okkervil River and Shearwater, native
- Cosy Sheridan (born 1964)
- Jon Spencer (born 1965), native
- Bill Staines (1947–2021)
- Buddy Stewart (1922–1950), native
- Sarah Stiles (born 1979)
- Steven Tyler (born 1948), member, Aerosmith
- Brian Viglione (born 1979), member, The Dresden Dolls
- Jillian Wheeler (born 1991)

=== Television personalities ===
- Dana Bash (born 1971), CNN journalist
- Samantha Brown (born 1970), travel journalist
- Ken Burns (born 1953), documentary filmmaker
- Carl Cameron (born 1961), Fox News correspondent
- Corey Lewandowski (born 1973), CNN, Fox News, and One America News Network political commentator; former 2016 Donald Trump presidential campaign manager
- Don Orsillo (born 1968), baseball broadcaster
- Trish Regan (born 1972), Fox Business anchor
- Kristin Tate, Fox News commentator
- Fritz Wetherbee (born 1938), New Hampshire Chronicle host, journalist

=== Game publishers ===
- Toby Fox (born 1991), creator of Undertale and Deltarune

== Political and military figures ==
- Sherman Adams (1899–1986)
- Kelly Ayotte (born 1968), native
- William J. Baroody Jr. (1937–1996), native
- Josiah Bartlett (1729–1795), Founding Father, physician, statesman, delegate to the Continental Congress for New Hampshire, and signatory to the Articles of Confederation and the Declaration of Independence
- Timothy Bedel (1737–1787), native
- Jason Bedrick (born 1983)
- Oliver Blake (1802–1873), American-born Canadian businessman and political figure
- Joseph Blanchard (1704–1758), native
- Edward H. Brooks (1893–1978), native
- Lewis Cass (1782–1866)
- Jonathan Chase (1732–1800)
- Salmon P. Chase (1808–1873), native
- Wentworth Cheswill (1746–1817), native
- Jonathan Cilley (1802–1838), native
- Joseph Cilley (1734–1799), native
- Joseph Cilley (1791–1887), native
- Robert W. Cone (1957–2016)
- John Cutt (1613–1681)
- Henry Dearborn (1751–1829), native
- Abraham Drake (1715–1781), native
- Michael Durant (born 1961), native
- Elizabeth Gurley Flynn (1890–1964), native
- Nathaniel Folsom (1726–1790)
- Rene Gagnon (1925–1979), native
- John Taylor Gilman (1753–1828)
- John Goffe (1701–1786)
- David Gottesman (born 1948)
- Judd Gregg (born 1947), native
- Doris Haddock (1910–2010), native
- Enoch Hale (1733–1813)
- Nathan Hale (1743–1780)
- Paul Hodes (born 1951)
- William E. Holyoke (1868–1934), native
- John Langdon (1741–1819), native
- Lyndon LaRouche (1922–2019)
- Karoline Leavitt (born 1997)
- Corey Lewandowski (born 1973)
- John Lynch (born 1952)
- Sean Patrick Maloney (born 1966)
- Richard Martyn (1630–1694)
- Robert Tufton Mason (1625–1688)
- Thomas J. McIntyre (1915–1992)
- Frank Merrill (1903–1955), Merrill's Marauders
- Nathaniel Meserve (1704–1758), native
- James Miller (1776–1851), native
- Jonathan Moulton (1726–1787), native
- Moses Nichols (1740–1790)
- Richard O'Kane (1911–1994), native
- Frank Nesmith Parsons (1854–1934), native
- Nathaniel Peabody (1741–1823)
- David Petraeus (born 1952), summer resident
- Benjamin Pierce (1757–1839)
- Franklin Pierce (1804–1869), 14th president of the United States
- Enoch Poor (1736–1780)
- James Reed (c. 1722–1807)
- George Reid (1733–1815), native
- Warren Rudman (1930–2012)
- Alexander Scammel (1747–1781)
- Jeanne Shaheen (born 1947)
- Sumner Shapiro (1926–2006)
- Carol Shea-Porter (born 1952), native
- Max Silber (1911–2004)
- Charles J. Simons (1843–1914)
- David Souter (born 1939)
- John Stark (1728–1822), native
- Thomas Stickney (1729–1809), native
- Harlan F. Stone (1872–1946), native
- John Sullivan (1740–1795), native
- John H. Sununu (born 1939)
- John E. Sununu (born 1964)
- Katrina Swett (born 1955)
- Richard Swett (born 1957)
- Meldrim Thomson Jr. (1912–2001)
- Matthew Thornton (1714–1803)
- Colin Van Ostern (born 1979), native
- George H. Wadleigh (1842–1927), native
- Richard Waldron (1615–1689)
- Thomas Westbrook Waldron (1721–1785), native
- Meshech Weare (1713–1786), native
- Daniel Webster (1782–1852), native
- Benning Wentworth (1696–1770), native
- John Wentworth (1737–1820)
  - see also John Wentworth (disambiguation)
- William Whipple (1731–1785)
- Leonard Wood (1860–1927), native
- Isaac Wyman (1724–1792)
- Louis C. Wyman (1917–2002), native
- Dawn Zimmer (born 1968)

== Religious figures ==
- Mary Baker Eddy (1821–1910)
- John W. Gowdy (1869–1963)
- Monsignor Pierre Hevey (1831–1910)
- Gene Robinson (born 1947)

== Scientists and engineers ==
- Leonard Bailey (1825–1905), inventor, toolmaker, cabinet maker
- C. Loring Brace (1930–2019), anthropologist
- Stuart Chase (1888–1985), economist and engineer
- Sarah A. Colby (1824–1904), physician
- Jim Collins (born 1965), MacArthur genius, bioengineer and inventor
- William E. Corbin (1869–1951), inventor of paper towels
- Sidney Darlington (1906–1997), electrical engineer and inventor of the Darlington transistor
- Dean Kamen (born 1951), inventor of the Segway and founder of the FIRST Robotics Competition
- Erasmus Darwin Leavitt Jr. (1836–1916), mechanical engineer, known for his steam engine designs
- Frank J. Mafera (1898–1956), businessman and inventor of residential chain-link fence
- Edward William Nelson (1855–1934), naturalist and ethnologist
- Sylvester H. Roper (1823–1896), inventor, pioneering builder of early automobiles and motorcycles
- Ambrose Swasey (1846–1937), mechanical engineer, inventor, and entrepreneur
- Earl Silas Tupper (1907–1983), chemist, inventor of Tupperware
- George H. Whipple (1878–1976), physician, pathologist and biomedical researcher; recipient, 1932 Nobel Prize in Physiology or Medicine (Ashland)

== Other ==
- Brooke Astor (1902–2007), philanthropist; recipient, Presidential Medal of Freedom (native)
- Hal Barwood, screenwriter, film producer, game designer and game producer
- Stephanie Birkitt (born 1975), former assistant to David Letterman on Late Show with David Letterman
- William Robinson Brown (1875–1955), business leader in Coos County; founder and owner, Maynesboro Stud
- H. Maria George Colby (1844–1910), suffragist, activist, journalist, native
- Jonathan Daniels (1939–1965), civil rights activist
- Brian De Palma (born 1940), film director
- Tom Dey (born 1965), film director
- Annie Duke (born 1965), professional poker player; sister of Howard Lederer
- Michael Durant (born 1961), pilot and author
- Dan Eckman (born 1984), director, writer
- Ivan Edwards, ex-minister, community organizer, doctor, reserve military officer
- Robert Eggers (born 1983), filmmaker and production designer
- Darby Field (1610–1649), first European to climb Mount Washington
- Phineas Gage (1823–1860), railroad construction foreman whose survival of an accident influenced discussion about the brain
- George Hawkins, victim of a bad skin graft that led to the celebrated "Hairy Hand" case of Hawkins v. McGee
- Jenna Miscavige Hill (born 1984), critic of the Church of Scientology
- Gary Hirshberg (born 1954), chief executive officer, Stonyfield Farm
- Jigger Johnson (1871–1935), lumberjack
- Harriet McEwen Kimball (1834–1917), philanthropist, hospital co-founder, poet, hymnist, native
- A.G. Lafley (born 1947), chief executive officer, Procter & Gamble
- Howard Lederer (born 1964), professional poker player; brother of Annie Duke
- Alanis Obomsawin (born 1932), documentary filmmaker
- Chris Ohlson (born 1975), film producer and director
- Charles Revson (1906–1975), businessman
- Robert Rodat (born c. 1960), screenwriter, producer
- Chris Sheridan (born 1967), TV writer
- Lydia H. Tilton (1839–1915), educator, activist, journalist, poet, lyricist
- Anna Augusta Truitt (1837–1920), philanthropist, reformer, essayist

== Gallery ==
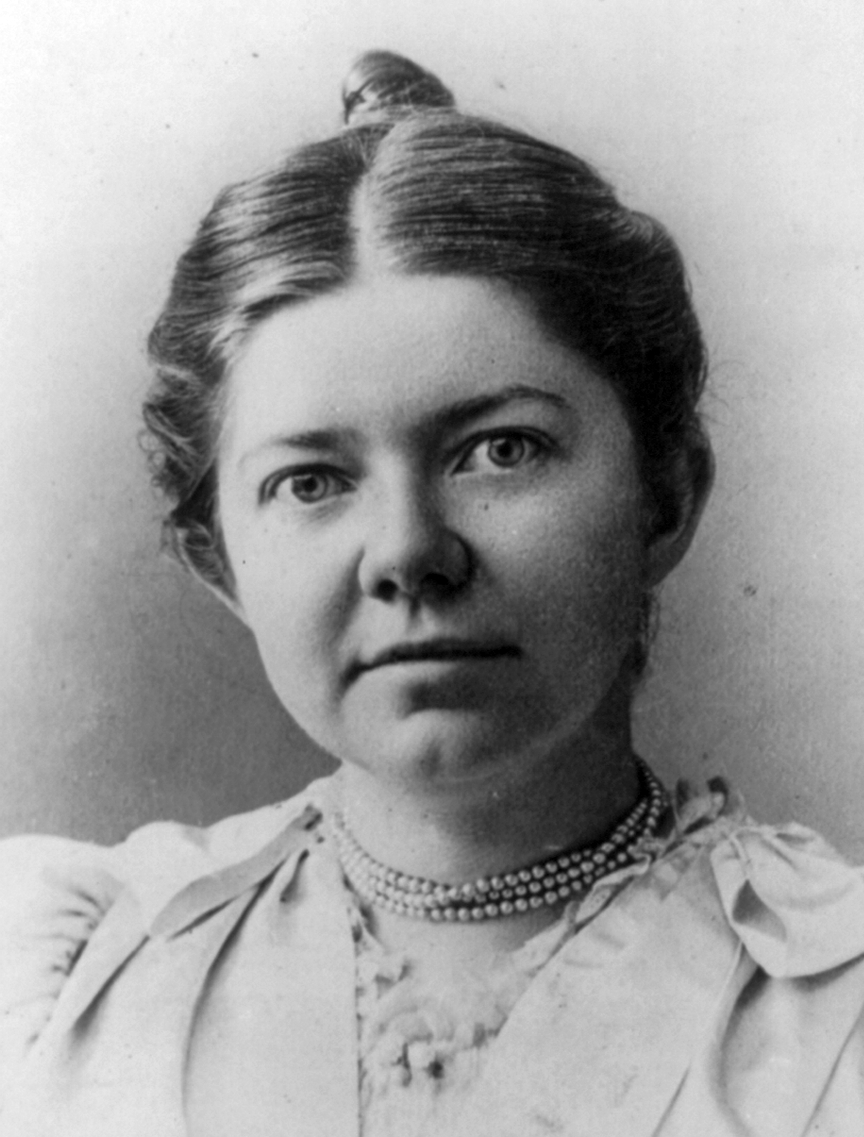
Amy Beach
(1867–1944), pianist and composer

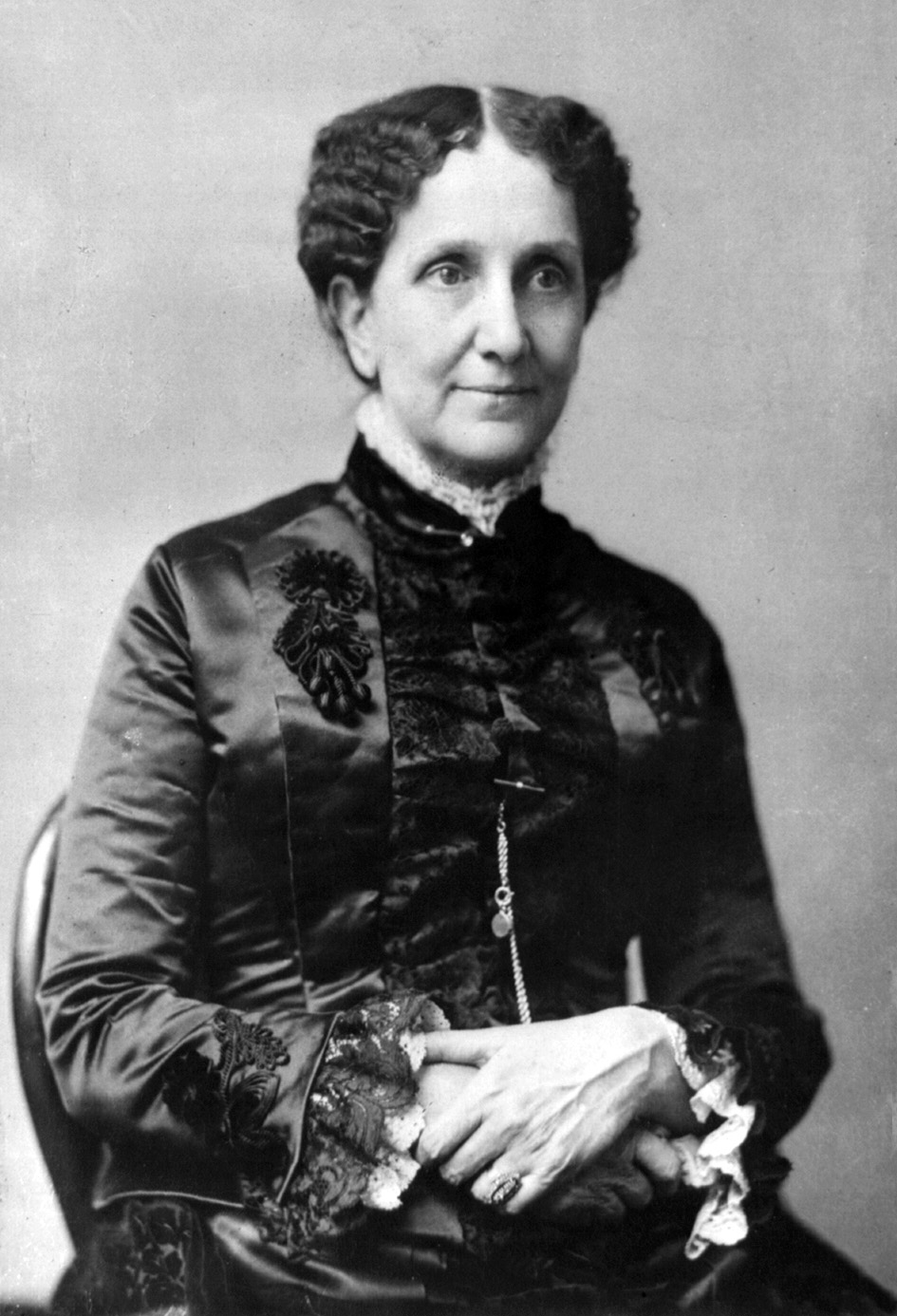
Mary Baker Eddy
(1821–1910), founder of Christian Science

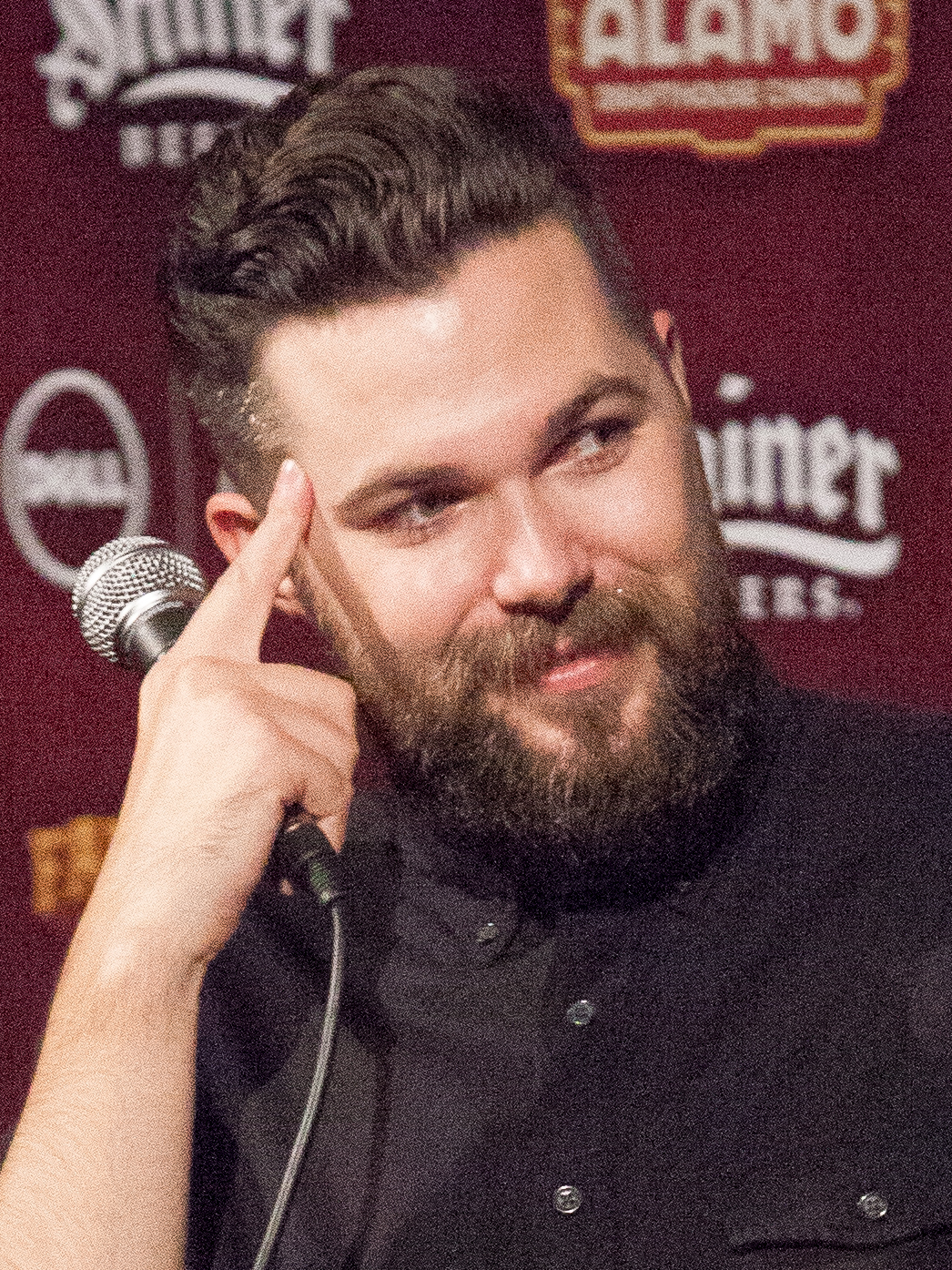
Robert Eggers
(born 1983), filmmaker

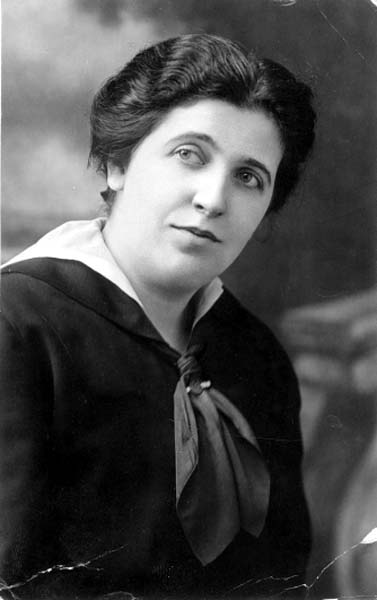
Elizabeth Gurley Flynn
(born 1890), labor leader and chairperson of the Communist Party USA

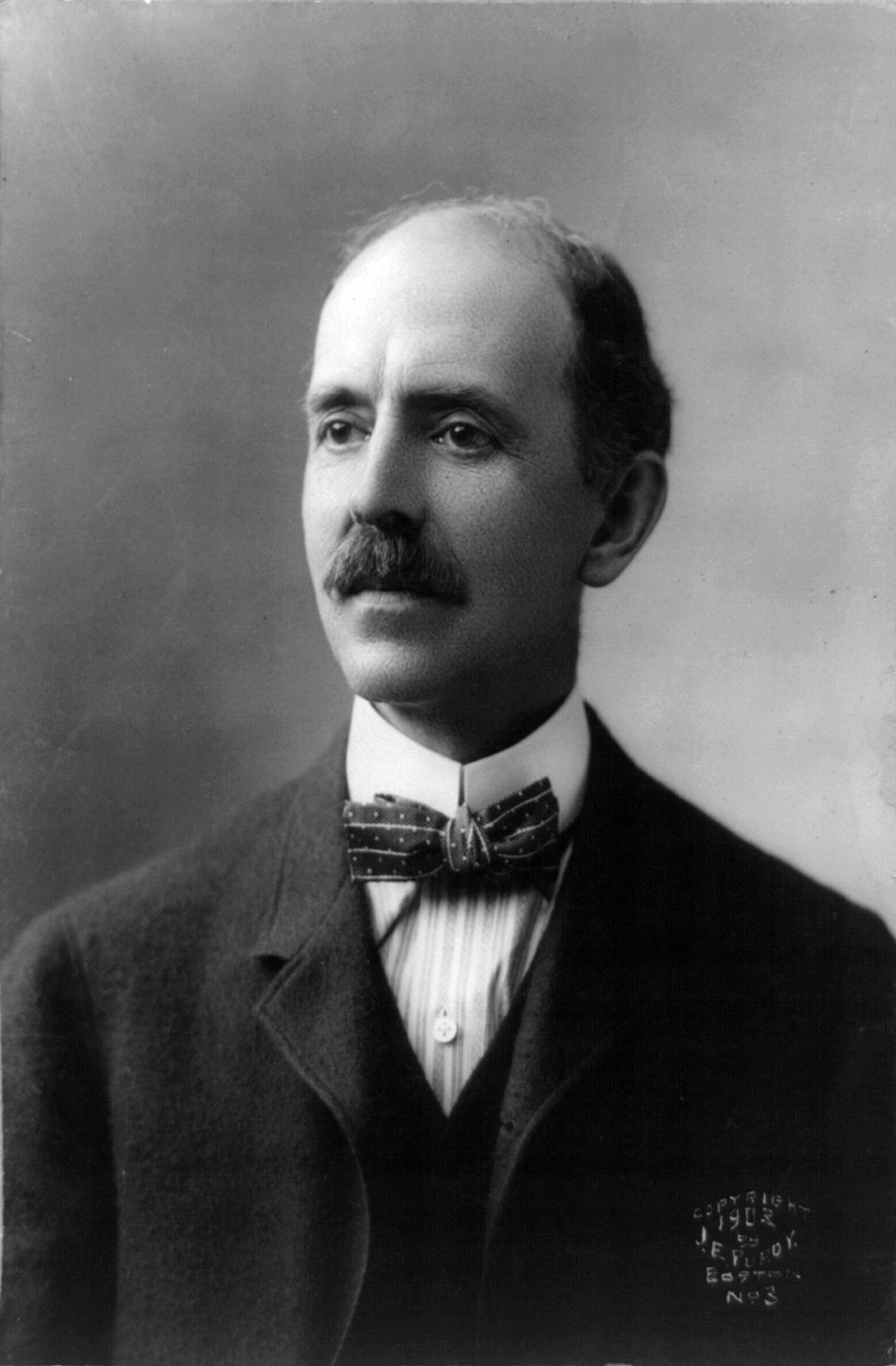
Daniel Chester French
(1850–1931), acclaimed sculptor

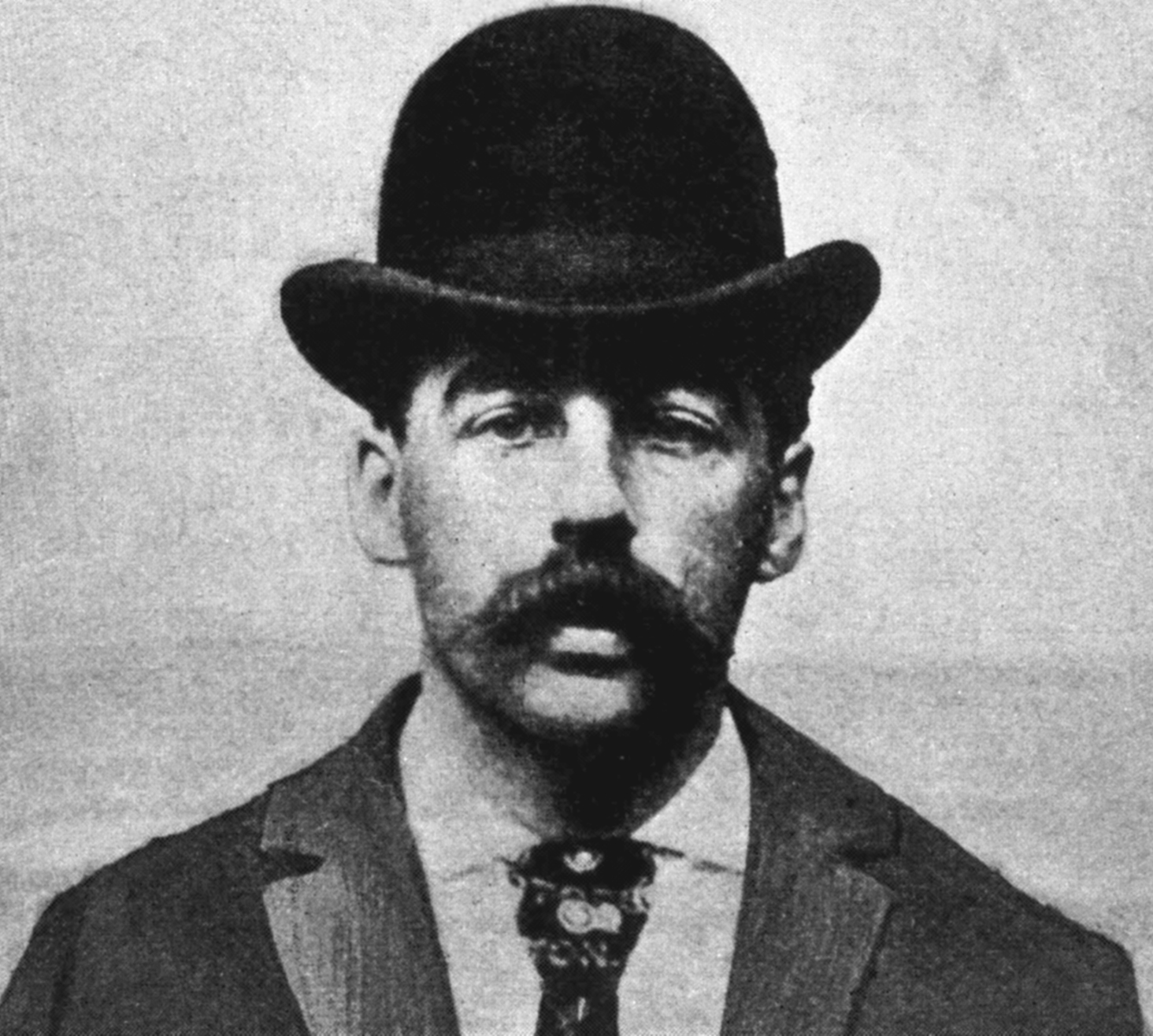
H. H. Holmes
(1861–1896), serial killer

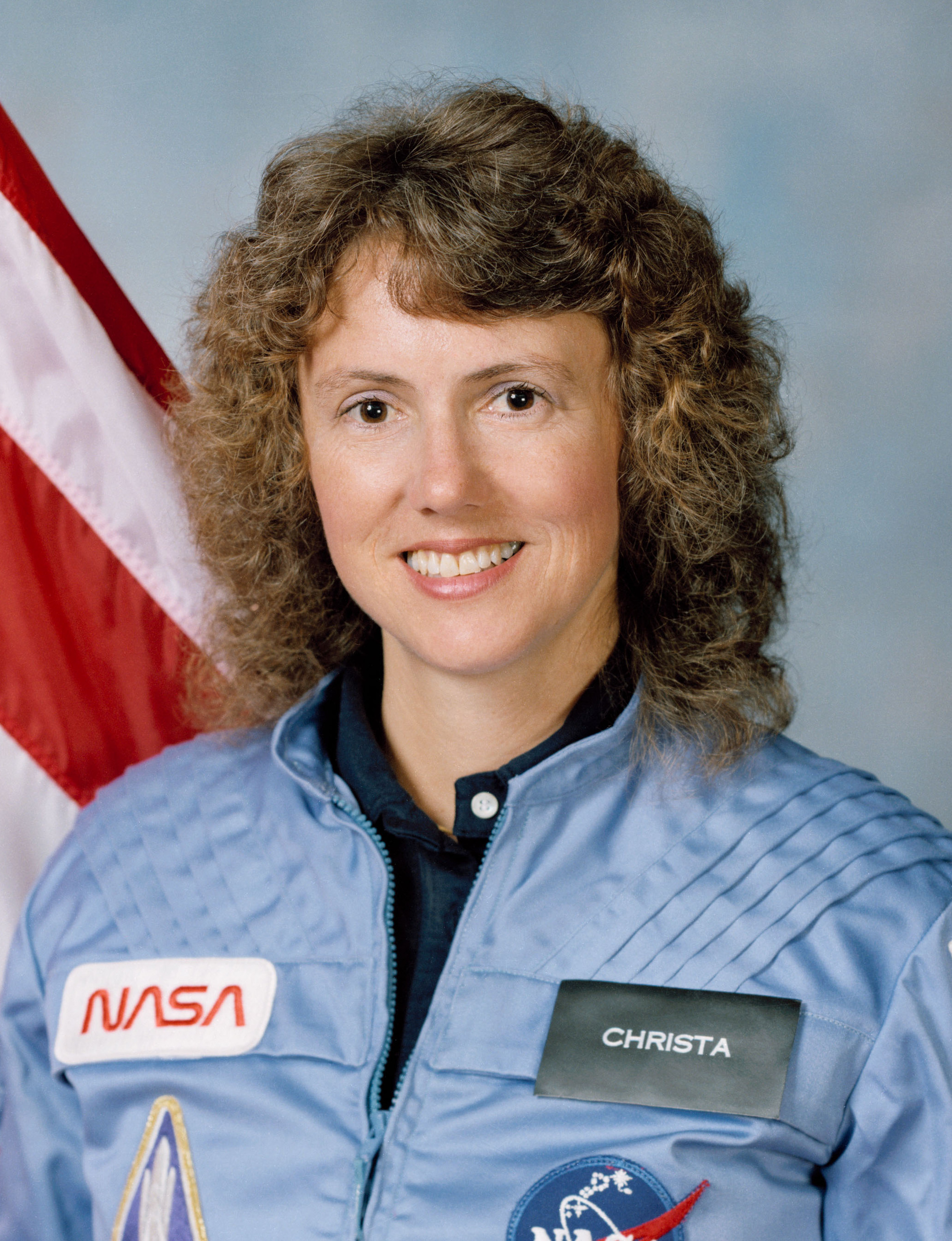
Christa McAuliffe
(1948-1986), educator and astronaut

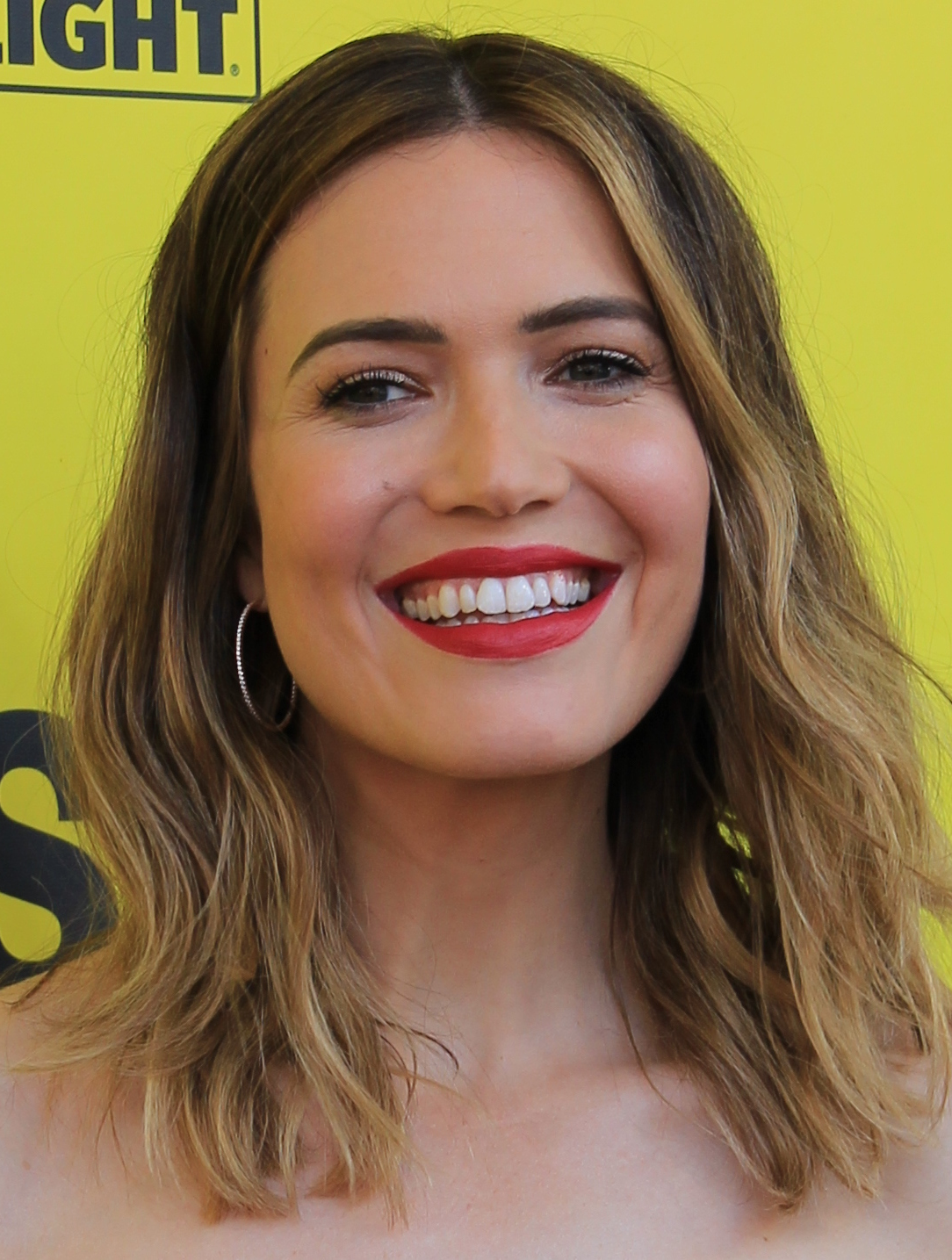
Mandy Moore
(born 1984), singer and actress

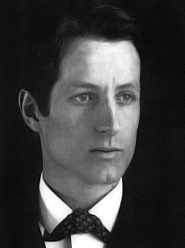
Maxfield Parrish
(1870-1966), painter and illustrator

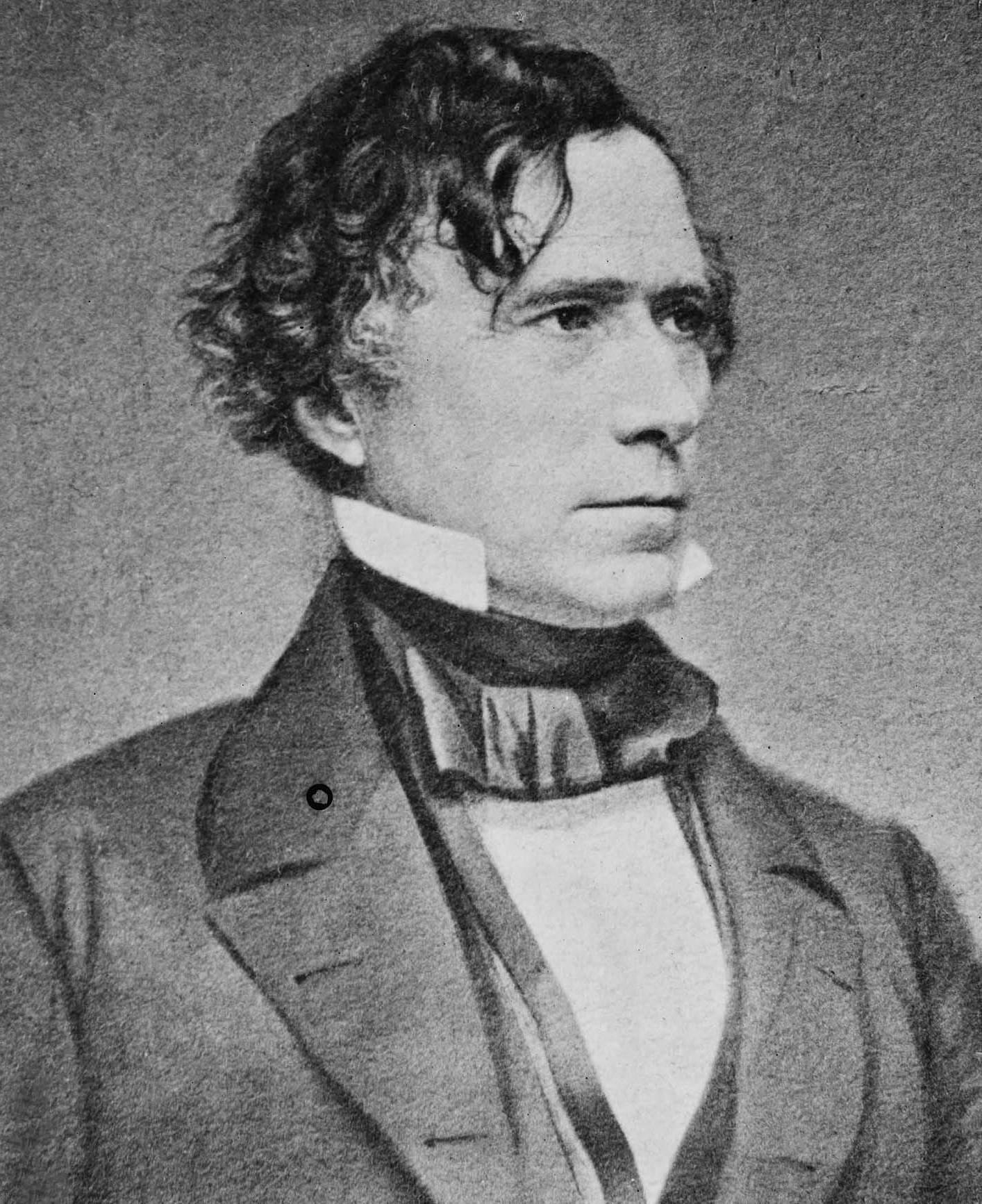
Franklin Pierce
(1804–1869), 14th president of the United States

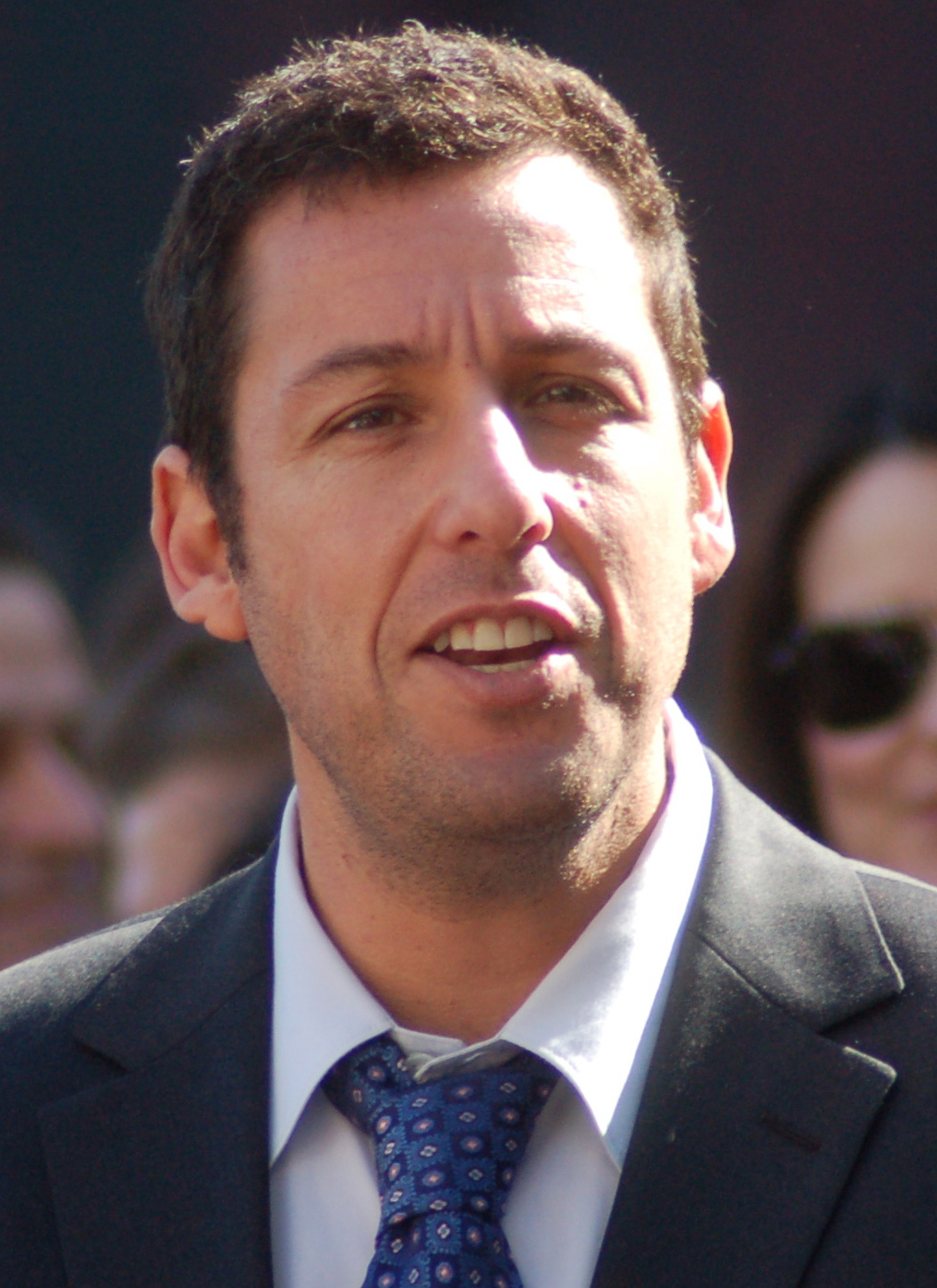
Adam Sandler
(born 1966), actor and comedian

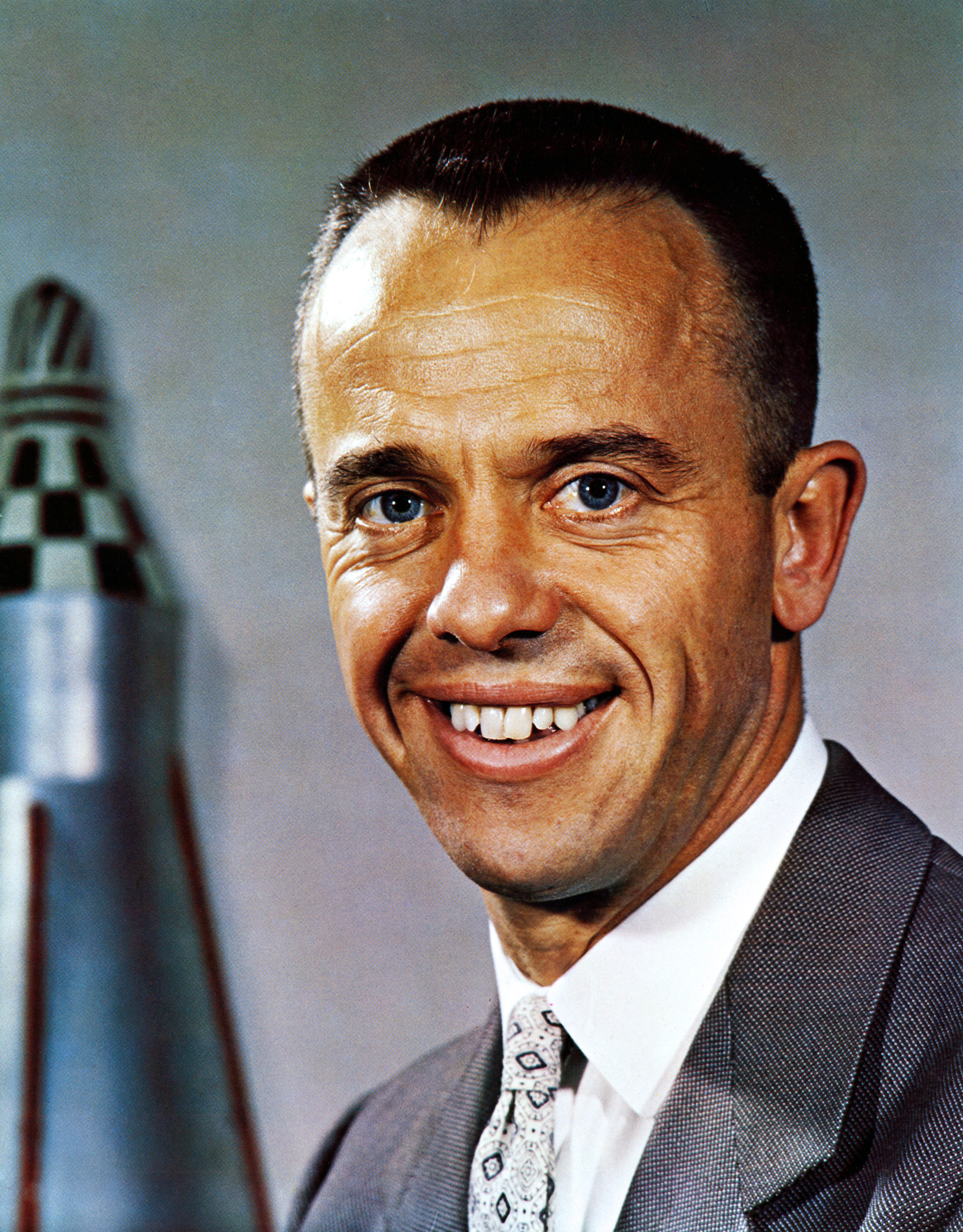
Alan Shepard
(1923–1998), first American in space

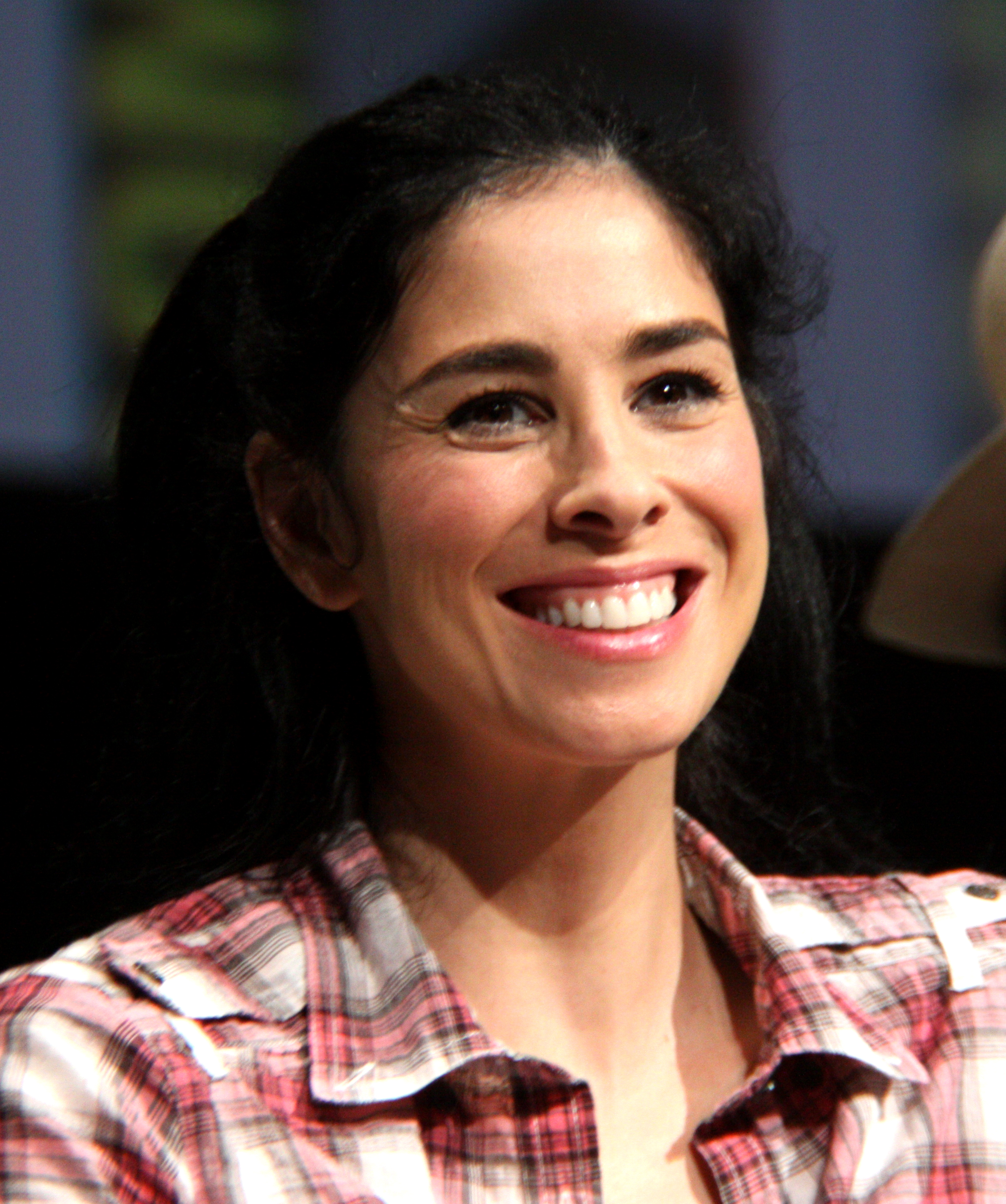
Sarah Silverman
(born 1970), actress and comedian

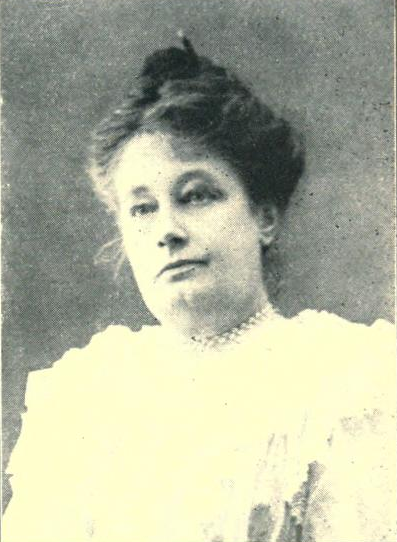
Katherine Call Simonds
(1865–1946), composer and social reformer

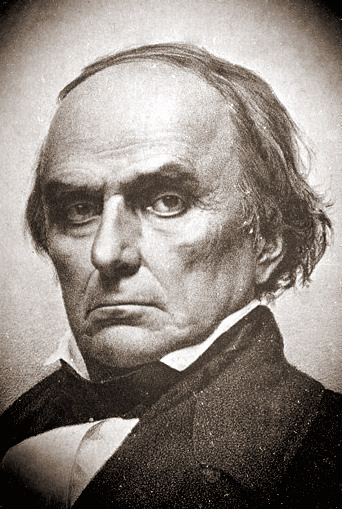
Daniel Webster
(1782–1852), U.S. senator and representative from Massachusetts and New Hampshire

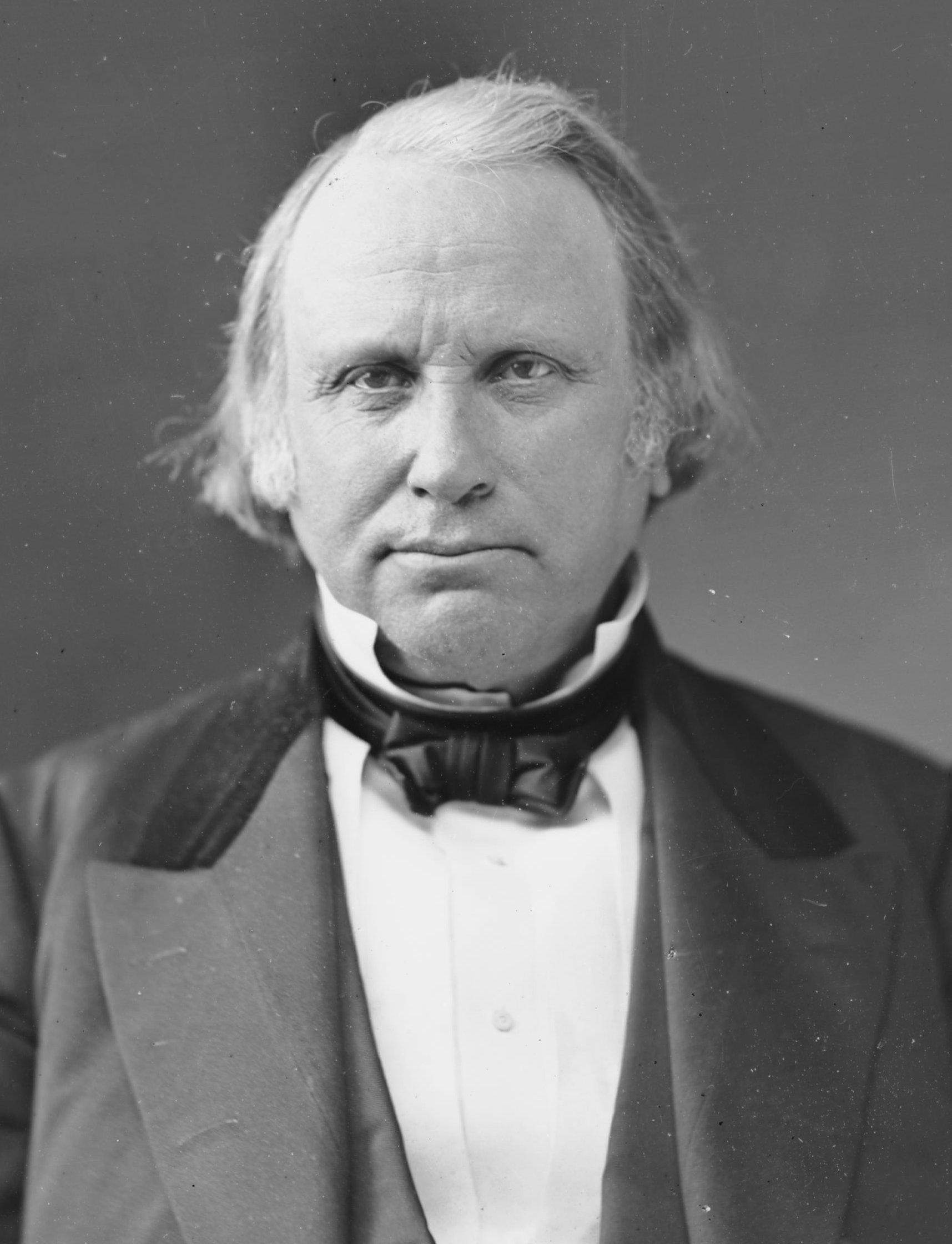
Henry Wilson
(1812–1875), 18th vice president of the United States

== See also ==
- List of Dartmouth College alumni
- List of Dartmouth College faculty
- List of New Hampshire suffragists
- List of people from Concord, New Hampshire
- List of people from Dover, New Hampshire
- List of people from Exeter, New Hampshire
- List of people from Hanover, New Hampshire
- List of people from Manchester, New Hampshire
- List of people from Nashua, New Hampshire
- List of people from Portsmouth, New Hampshire
- List of Phillips Exeter Academy alumni
- List of St. Paul's School alumni
- Lists of Americans
- New Hampshire native
