= List of people from Portsmouth, New Hampshire =

The following list includes notable people who were born or have lived in Portsmouth, New Hampshire.

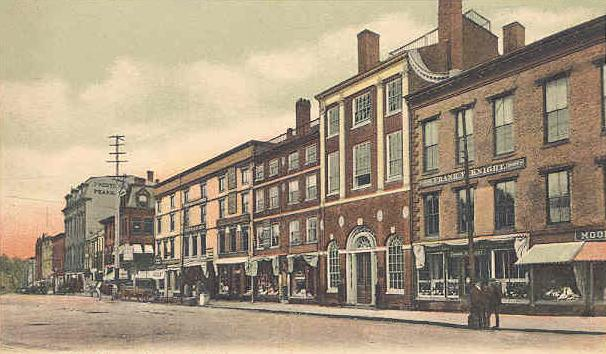
Market Square c. 1905

== Academics and science ==
- John Knowlton Bartlett (1816–1899), physician
- Edmund March Blunt (1770–1862), navigator, publisher
- E. Warren Clark (1849–1907), educator
- Elliott Coues (1842–1899), army surgeon, historian, ornithologist, and author
- Alfred L. Elwyn (1804–1884), physician, pioneer in the training and care of the mentally disabled
- Laurence G. Leavitt (1903–2000), headmaster of Vermont Academy
- Richard A. Searfoss (1956–2018), astronaut
- Benjamin Thompson, Count Rumford (1753–1814), physicist, inventor; count of the Holy Roman Empire
- Frederick Pearson Treadwell (1857–1918), chemist
- Elizabeth Virgil (1903–1991), educator

== Arts and architecture ==
- Alfred Thompson Bricher (1837–1908), artist
- Marc Drogin (1936–2017), writer and illustrator
- William H. Folsom (1815–1901), architect
- Jim McDermott (born 1960), painter, illustrator, cartoonist

== Business ==
- Brooke Astor (1902–2007), socialite, philanthropist; chairwoman of the Vincent Astor Foundation
- Robert Harris (1830–1894), railway president
- Paul Waterman (1964–present), businessman, conservationist, owner of the Library Restaurant

== Judiciary ==
- Edward Henry Durell (1810–1887), US federal judge
- John L. Rand (1861–1942), 22nd chief justice of the Oregon Supreme Court
- John Samuel Sherburne (1757–1830), soldier, US federal judge
- Samuel Treat (1815–1902), US federal judge
- Joshua Winslow (1726–1801), soldier, politician, judge

== Media ==
- Bill Alfonso (born 1957), former pro wrestling referee and manager (born William Matthew Sierra in Portsmouth)
- Tom Bergeron (born 1955), TV presenter, game show host
- Peter Bonerz (born 1938), actor, director
- Samantha Brown (born 1970), Travel Channel host, TV personality
- William F. Haddock (1877–1969), film director of the silent film era
- Jean Kasem (born 1954), actress
- Milton Selzer (1918–2006), stage, film, and television actor
- Ilene Woods (1929–2010), actress, voice of Cinderella

== Military ==
- Charles C. Carpenter (1834–1899), United States Navy rear admiral who rose to command of the Asiatic Squadron; resided in Portsmouth
- Francis Cogswell (1887–1939), U.S. Navy captain; Navy Cross recipient for actions during World War I
- Frederick Franklin (1840–1873), U.S. Navy quartermaster; Medal of Honor recipient (1871 Korean Campaign)
- Mark G. Ham (1820–1869), U.S. Navy sailor; Medal of Honor recipient (American Civil War)
- John Hart (1706–1777), colonel in the New Hampshire militia
- Charles Hovey (1885–1911), U.S. Navy officer (Philippine–American War)
- John Paul Jones (1747–1792), "father" of U.S. Navy
- Nathaniel Meserve (1704–1758), shipwright, soldier
- Enoch Greenleafe Parrott (1814–1879), U.S. Navy rear admiral (Mexican–American War and American Civil War)
- Fitz John Porter (1822–1901), Union Army major general (American Civil War)
- Robert H. Wyman (1822–1882), U.S. Navy rear admiral

== Music ==
- Al Barr (born 1968), musician and lead singer of Dropkick Murphys and The Bruisers
- Gina Catalino (born 1984), singer-songwriter
- Ronnie James Dio (1942–2010), heavy metal singer-songwriter, frontman for Elf, Rainbow, Black Sabbath, Dio, and Heaven and Hell
- Geoff Palmer (born 1980), musician, singer, and songwriter; member of The Connection, the Kurt Baker band, and The Queers
- Tom Rush (born 1941), singer-songwriter
- Bill Staines (1947–2021), folk musician

== Politics ==
- Amos T. Akerman (1821–1880), US attorney general
- Ichabod Bartlett (1786–1853), US congressman
- Clifton Clagett (1762–1829), US congressman
- Renny Cushing (1962–2022), New Hampshire state representative
- Samuel Cushman (1783–1851), US congressman
- John Cutt (1613–1681), merchant, mill owner, and provincial president of New Hampshire
- Charles Cutts (1769–1846), US senator
- Charles M. Dale (1893–1978), mayor, state senator, and the 66th governor of New Hampshire
- William S. Damrell (1809–1860), US congressman
- John A. Durkin (1936–2012), US senator
- Eileen Foley (1918–2016), eight-term mayor of Portsmouth (1968–1971, 1984–1985, 1988–1997), state senator, and former minority leader of the New Hampshire Senate
- Ichabod Goodwin (1794–1882), 34th governor of New Hampshire
- William Hale (1765–1848), US congressman
- Nathaniel Appleton Haven (1762–1831), US congressman
- Andrew Jarvis (1890–1990), mayor and member of the Governor's Council
- Frank Jones (1832–1902), businessman, US congressman, mayor
- John Langdon (1741–1819), Founding Father of the United States, merchant, president pro tempore of the US senate, and the governor of New Hampshire (2nd, 4th, 8th & 10th)
- Woodbury Langdon (1739–1805), Founding Father, merchant, statesman, judge; delegate from New Hampshire to the Continental Congress
- Tobias Lear (1762–1816), personal secretary to President George Washington; served Washington from 1784 until the former president's death in 1799
- Edward St. Loe Livermore (1762–1832), US congressman
- Pierse Long (1739–1789), colonel of the Continental Army in the Revolutionary War, merchant, US senator
- Henry B. Lovering (1841–1911), US congressman
- Garreth Lynch (1943–2026), member of the Massachusetts House of Representatives
- Daniel Marcy (1809–1893), US congressman
- Richard Martyn (1630–1694), early Portsmouth representative, speaker of the house, chief justice
- John Fabyan Parrott (1767–1836), US congressman and senator
- Charles H. Peaslee (1804–1866), US congressman and lawyer
- Joseph Peirce (1748–1812), US congressman and soldier
- John J. Perry (1811–1897), US congressman
- Wesley Powell (1915–1981), lawyer and 70th governor of New Hampshire
- John Randall Reding (1805–1892), US congressman
- James Sheafe (1755–1829), US congressman and senator
- James R. Splaine (born 1947), New Hampshire state legislator, Portsmouth vice-mayor
- Clement Storer (1760–1830), US congressman, senator
- Daniel Webster (1782–1852), US senator from Massachusetts and the 14th and 19th US secretary of state
- Benning Wentworth (1696–1770), colonial governor of New Hampshire 1741–1766
- Sir John Wentworth (1737–1820), British colonial governor of New Hampshire at the time of the American Revolution; later also lieutenant-governor of Nova Scotia
- William Whipple (1731–1785), ship's captain, merchant, Founding Father, signatory of the United States Declaration of Independence; represented New Hampshire as a member of the Continental Congress 1776–1779
- Oren Elbridge Wilson (1844–1917), mayor of Albany, New York, raised in Portsmouth

== Religion ==
- Joseph Stevens Buckminster (1784–1812), minister
- Samuel Langdon (1723–1797), clergyman, educator, college president
- Samuel Parker (1744–1804), bishop

== Sports ==
- Jane Blalock (born 1945), golfer with the LPGA Tour
- George Haddock (1866–1926), Major League Baseball pitcher 1888–1894
- Eric Jenkins (born 1991), Olympic 1500m athlete
- Josh Owens (born 1988), basketball player for Hapoel Tel Aviv of the Israeli Basketball Premier League
- Dick Scott (1933–2020), pitcher with the Los Angeles Dodgers and Chicago Cubs

== Slavery ==
- Oney Judge (1773–1848), runaway slave

== Writing ==
- John Greenleaf Adams (1810–1897), hymn writer
- Thomas Bailey Aldrich (1836–1907), poet, novelist, editor
- Helen Dore Boylston (1895–1984), author
- Elliott Coues (1842–1899), surgeon, historian, author
- Clayton Emery (born 1953), author
- James T. Fields (1817–1881), publisher, author
- Harriet McEwen Kimball (1834–1917), poet, hymnwriter, philanthropist, hospital co-founder
- Eliza Lee (1792–1864), author
- John Lord (1810–1894), historian, lecturer
- Samuel Penhallow (1665–1726), historian, militia leader in present-day Maine during Queen Anne's War and Father Rale's War
- Benjamin Penhallow Shillaber (1814–1890), printer, editor, humorist
- Celia Thaxter (1835–1894), poet, writer
