= New Hampshire native =

Status of people born in New Hampshire

A New Hampshire native is a status recognized by the U.S. state of New Hampshire which identifies people who were born in the state. The word native denotes someone who was born in a given place. State law, defines a New Hampshire native as "someone who was born in the state of New Hampshire or someone born to a mother domiciled in the state of New Hampshire at the time of his or her birth."

The law does not give the status any legal weight, and even notes that misusing the term isn't illegal: "No person who in good faith proclaims himself or herself to be a New Hampshire native ... shall be charged with perjury."

== See also ==
- List of people from New Hampshire, for a list of New Hampshire natives
