= List of people from Concord, New Hampshire =

The following list includes notable people who were born or have lived in Concord, New Hampshire.

== Artists, authors, and entertainers ==
- John Adams (born 1947), Pulitzer Prize-winning composer
- Emma Elizabeth Brown (born 1847–?), artist, writer
- JooYoung Choi (born 1982), artist
- Carson Cistulli (born 1979), poet, essayist, baseball analyst
- George Condo (born 1957), artist
- Tony Conrad (1940–2016), experimental filmmaker, musician, composer
- Annie Duke (born 1965), professional poker player
- Dan Habib, photojournalist, documentary filmmaker
- Richard Lederer (born 1938), author, commentator on the English language
- Frederick Ferdinand Moore (1881–1947), novelist, soldier, recipient of Japanese Order of the Rising Sun
- Tad Mosel (1922–2008), Pulitzer Prize-winning playwright
- Jascha Richter (born 1963), musician, the lead singer of Danish rock band Michael Learns to Rock
- Tom Rush (born 1941), folk and blues singer and songwriter
- Mary Parker Woodworth (1849–1919), writer, speaker

== Business and organizations ==
- Gary Hirshberg (born 1954), CEO of Stonyfield Farm
- Benjamin Holt (1849–1920), inventor; founder of Holt Manufacturing Company
- Levi Hutchins (1761–1855), clockmaker, inventor in 1787 of the first American alarm clock
- Sylvester Marsh (1803–1884), builder of the Mount Washington Cog Railway
- Fanny E. Minot (1847–1919), national president Woman's Relief Corps
- Sarah Thompson, Countess Rumford (1774–1852), philanthropist, founder of Rolfe and Rumford Asylum and daughter of Benjamin Thompson (loyalist to Britain during the American Revolutionary War)

== Military ==
- Onslow S. Rolfe (1895–1985), U.S. Army brigadier general

== Politics ==
- Joseph Carter Abbott (1825–1881), Union Army general in the Civil War, U.S. senator from North Carolina
- Styles Bridges (1898–1961), U.S. senator, 63rd governor of New Hampshire
- Frank O. Briggs (1851–1913), U.S. senator from New Jersey, New Jersey state senator, mayor of Trenton, New Jersey, born in Concord
- Henry G. Burleigh (1832–1900), U.S. congressman
- Benjamin F. Carter (1824–1916), Wisconsin legislator
- William E. Chandler (1835–1917), U.S. senator, U.S. secretary of the Navy
- Ezra Durgin (1796–1863), Wisconsin legislator
- Elizabeth Gurley Flynn (1890–1964), labor leader, activist
- John R. French (1819–1890), U.S. congressman
- Joseph A. Gilmore (1811–1867), railroad superintendent, 29th governor of New Hampshire
- Charles G. Haines (1792–1825), Democratic-Republican Party organizer in Concord, Adjutant General of New York
- Isaac Hill (1788–1851), U.S. senator, 16th governor of New Hampshire
- Paul Hodes (born 1951), U.S. congressman
- Arthur Livermore (1766–1853), U.S. congressman
- Mace Moulton (1796–1867), U.S. congressman
- Franklin Pierce (1804–1869), 14th president of the United States
- David Souter (1939–2025), associate justice of the Supreme Court of the United States
- Thomas Stickney (1729–1809), soldier in the American Revolution, statesman
- George P. Tebbetts (1828–1909), third mayor of San Diego (1852)
- Robert W. Upton (1884–1972), U.S. senator

== Religious workers ==
- Mary Baker Eddy (1821–1910), founder of the Church of Christ, Scientist
- Ruth A. Parmelee (1885–1973), Christian missionary, witness to the Armenian genocide
- Armenia S. White (1817–1916) suffragette, philanthropist, social reformer

== Scientists and academics ==
- Judy Fortin (born 1961), medical correspondent for CNN
- Jane Elizabeth Hoyt-Stevens (1860–1933), physician, writer, and suffragist based in Concord
- Christa McAuliffe (1948–1986), teacher, first Teacher in Space project winner, died in the Space Shuttle Challenger disaster
- Jane M. Olson (1952–2004), genetic epidemiologist and biostatistician
- Sir Benjamin Thompson, Count Rumford (1753–1814), scientist, inventor, loyalist during the American Revolutionary War

== Sports ==
- Gavin Bayreuther (born 1994), defenseman for the Columbus Blue Jackets
- Matt Bonner (born 1980), power forward and center for the Toronto Raptors and San Antonio Spurs
- Joe Lefebvre (born 1956), right fielder for the New York Yankees, San Diego Padres, and Philadelphia Phillies
- Ben Lovejoy (born 1984), former NHL defenseman
- Tara Mounsey (born 1978), hockey defenseman, played for the U.S. women's Olympic hockey team
- Red Rolfe (1908–1969), New York Yankees starting player, five-time World Series winner
- Brian Sabean (born 1956), general manager of the San Francisco Giants
- Bob Tewksbury (born 1960), pitcher for six Major League Baseball teams
