= Lyman Heath =

Lyman Heath (misnamed in some accounts as Leonard Heath) (24 August 1804 – 30 July 1870) was an American vocalist and composer.

Heath was born in New Hampshire - the exact location is uncertain, as one source places this event in Bow, New Hampshire, while another names Lyman, New Hampshire. He married a daughter of Alexander Albee, and moved to Littleton in 1834, residing there until 1840. He worked as a shoemaker for part of each year, organizing and teaching a singing-school during the winter months. He taught at Littleton and Lyman, as well as Franconia, Sugar Hill, and Lisbon. Pupils paid one dollar each for twelve lessons. With rare exceptions, only sacred music was taught, most frequently compositions such as those by Lowell Mason and Henry K. Oliver.

Heath composed the widely anthologized poem, "The Grave of Bonaparte" with Henry Washburne. Heath was an early advocate of the Hutchinson Family singing group. He also composed the melody for "The Burial of Mrs Judson."
