= List of people from Dover, New Hampshire =

The following list includes notable people who were born or have lived in Dover, New Hampshire.

== Academics and writing ==
- Kenneth Appel (1932–2013), mathematician; solved the four-color theorem
- Jeremy Belknap (1744–1798), clergyman, historian
- Lisa Crystal Carver (born 1968), writer, performance artist
- Matt Chandler, children's book author
- Peter K. Hepler (born 1936), biologist
- Joseph Moreau, author
- Frank M. Rines (1892–1962), landscape artist, professor

== Architecture ==
- Alvah T. Ramsdell (1852–1928), architect practicing in Dover from 1889 to 1928
- Fred Wesley Wentworth (1864–1943), architect known for many buildings in downtown Paterson, New Jersey, and for the Lucius Varney House in Dover

== Business ==
- Mary Edna Hill Gray Dow (1848–1914), financier, school principal, correspondent

== Military ==
- Joshua James Guppey (1820–1893), Union Army brigadier general during the Civil War
- John Hart (1706–1777), colonial militia officer
- Dan Christie Kingman (1852–1916), U.S. Army brigadier general
- Joseph C. McConnell (1922–1954), United States Air Force fighter pilot who was the top American flying ace during the Korean War
- Hercules Mooney (1715–1800), officer, teacher during the Revolutionary War
- Richard O'Kane (1911–1994), U.S. Navy rear admiral
- John Underhill (1597–1672), settler, colonial soldier
- George H. Wadleigh (1842–1927), U.S. Navy rear admiral

== Music ==
- Spencer Albee (born 1976), musician, singer, songwriter
- Nelson Bragg (born 1961), percussionist, vocalist, songwriter
- Tommy Makem (1932–2007), Irish folk musician with his sons The Makem Brothers
- Nellie Brown Mitchell (1845–1924), concert singer, music educator, "one of Boston's favorite cantatrice."

== Politics and law ==
- John J. Ballentine (1927–2016), member of the New Hampshire House of Representatives
- Frank Willey Clancy (1852–1928), attorney general of New Mexico
- Daniel Meserve Durell (1769–1841), U.S. congressman
- John P. Hale (1806–1873), U.S. senator
- William Hale (1765–1848), U.S. congressman
- Joshua G. Hall (1828–1898), U.S. congressman, state senator
- Maurice J. Murphy, Jr. (1927–2002), U.S. senator
- Marilla Ricker (1840–1920), suffragist, first woman to run for governor of New Hampshire
- Charles H. Sawyer (1840–1908), manufacturer and governor of New Hampshire
- Richard Waldron (1615–1689), businessman and the second president (acting) of New Hampshire
- Richard Waldron III (1694–1753) Speaker of New Hampshire Assembly and political opponent to the Wentworths.
- John Wentworth (1719–1781), judge, colonial leader
- John Wentworth, Jr. (1745–1787), Founding Father, lawyer, signatory of the Articles of Confederation
- Tappan Wentworth (1802–1875), U.S. congressman
- Timothy R. Young (1811–1898), U.S. congressman

== Sports ==
- Conor Casey (born 1981), soccer player who represented the United States national team
- Dangerous Danny Davis (born 1956), former professional wrestling referee, wrestler
- Chip Kelly (born 1963), college football coach and former NFL coach
- Cathy O'Brien (born 1967), Olympic long-distance runner
- Ian Hamilton (born 1995), major-league baseball pitcher
- Jessica Parratto (born 1994), Olympic medal-winning diver
- Ray Thomas (1910–1993), catcher for the Brooklyn Dodgers
- Jenny Thompson (born 1973), Olympic swimmer; won twelve medals including eight gold medals
- Dike Varney (1880–1950), pitcher for the Cleveland Bronchos

== Other ==
- Sarah Jane Farmer (1847–1916), founder of the Greenacre Conferences
- Joseph Brown Smith (1823–1859), first blind person to graduate from a college in the United States
- Harper Watters, ballet dancer
