= Betsey Ann Stearns =

American inventor

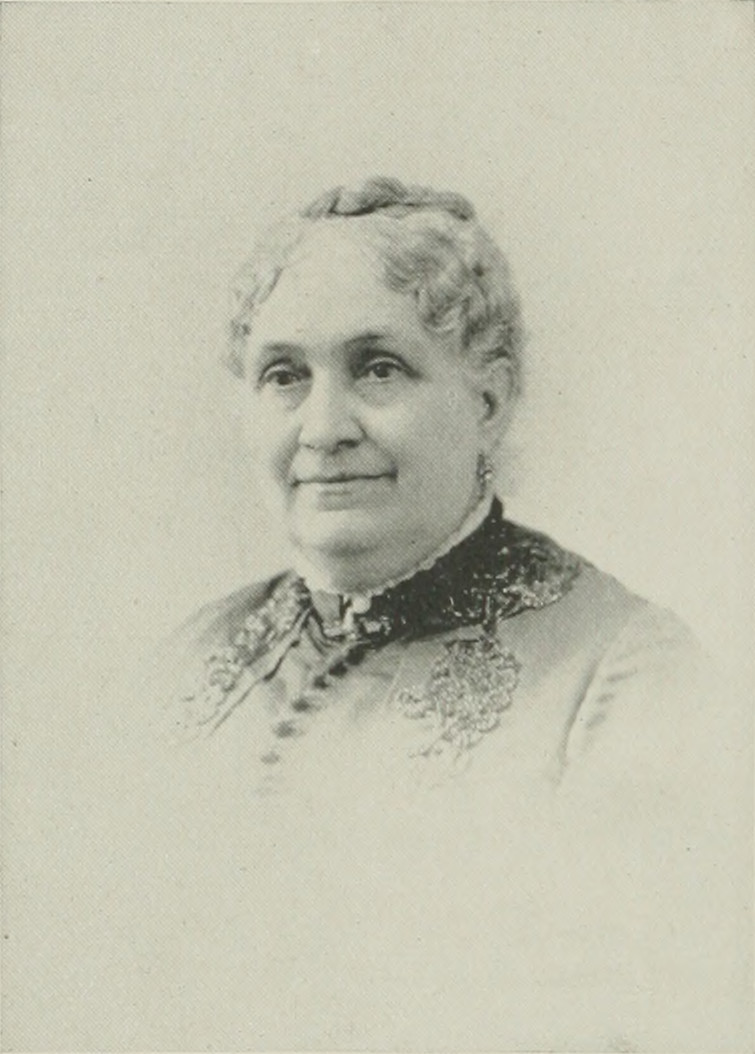
- "A Woman of the Century"
- Born: Betsey Ann Goward; June 29, 1830; Cornish, New Hampshire, U.S.
- Died: February 21, 1914 (aged 83); Providence, Rhode Island, U.S.
- Occupations: inventor; school founder; author
- Known for: "Diagram and System for Cutting Ladies' and Children's Garments"
- Spouse: Horatio Hammond Stearns (m. 1851; died 1879)
- Children: 3

Betsey Ann Stearns (née Goward; professionally known as B. A. Stearns; June 29, 1830 – February 21, 1914) was an American inventor of the long nineteenth century. She is credited with developing a "Diagram and System for Cutting Ladies' and Children's Garments". The invention was first issued in 1864 and improved upon in 1867. It is described as being simple and accurate, easily learned, and economical.

As a child, she entered the weaving mills of Nashua, New Hampshire, saving her money from her work to educate herself. After marriage, she became well known for her dress-cutting invention, which was awarded the highest prize in the Centennial Exposition in Philadelphia, 1876. She went on to organize the Boston Dresscutting School, with branches in other states. She also published two books focused on garment cutting.

== Early life and education ==
Betsey Ann Goward was born in Cornish, New Hampshire, June 29, 1830. Her father and mother, Isaac Goward (1782–1855) and Abigail Lothrop (1787–1848), were born in Easton, Massachusetts, and removed from there in their early married life to New Hampshire, where they engaged in farming, clearing the new lands and raising stock and wool. From the wool they grew, her mother spun, wove and made up the clothing for her family. She was the youngest of nine children, her siblings being Isaac, Francis, Sally, Ruel, Watson, Louisa, Jason, and Fidelia.

At the age of fourteen, Goward, with an older companion, left home to earn her own living, and engaged herself as a weaver of cloth in a cotton factory in Nashua, New Hampshire. She was able to provide for herself and to put money into a savings bank. After saving US$200, she returned to Cornish to visit her family and to go to school. She attended the schools in Meriden, New Hampshire, and Springfield, Vermont.

== Career ==
Goward was asked to teach a district school in East Mansfield, Massachusetts. After two terms of work there, she decided to go back to school. Afterwards, a relative in the tailoring business made her a good proposition, and Goward learned the tailor trade.

On June 4, 1851, she married Horatio Hammond Stearns (1818–1879), of Acton, Massachusetts. They lived in Acton until 1875, and then in Woburn, Massachusetts. The couple had three daughters, Delia, Clara, and Flora.

Stearns recognized the need for a reliable method to cut her own and her daughters dresses. When the opportunity arose, she learned a system, though very imperfect, that was useful, and could be taught to others. Being a natural innovator, Stearns resolved to develop something more reliable and accurate in its proportions for public use. In 1864, her first invention was made. After the Civil War, she taught her system to many widows, helping them gain the skills to support themselves and their families. Stearns also invented the "Complete Guide for cutting men's and boy's shirts, comprising twenty different sizes, and convenient for families and shirt manufacturers."

Stearns organized the Boston Dresscutting School and several other branch schools in other states. She published A System for Cutting Ladies' and Children's Garments by Measure, with Stearns' Improved Folding Diagram in 1885, and A System for Cutting Ladies' and Children's Garments by Tailor's Method with Stearns' Improved Diagram, in 1892.

== Death ==
Betsey Ann Stearns died in Providence, Rhode Island, February 21, 1914.

== Awards and honors ==
In 1869, her invention received from the Massachusetts Mechanical Association a silver medal and diploma. The invention also received the highest award in the Centennial Exposition in Philadelphia, in 1876, for its accuracy, simplicity and economy. In 1877 the American Institute, New York City, awarded the invention a special medal for excellence. In 1878, the Massachusetts Mechanical Association awarded a bronze medal to Stearns for her "Diagram for Cutting Garments, etc.":—

"This chart, which we consider second only to the Taylor system, took a Silver Medal at the 11th exhibition. For the great improvements in simplicity, accuracy, and economy in use and in teaching, we award a Bronze Medal."

== Selected works ==
- A System for Cutting Ladies' and Children's Garments by Measure, with Stearns' Improved Folding Diagram, 1885
- A System for Cutting Ladies' and Children's Garments by Tailor's Method with Stearns' Improved Diagram, 1892
