= Nicholas Hondrogen =

American painter

- Born: Nicholas John Hondrogen Jr. January 5, 1952; Concord, New Hampshire
- Died: February 28, 2007 (aged 55); Amherst, Massachusetts
- Known for: Painter
- Movement: Abstract expressionism

Nicholas Hondrogen (January 5, 1952 – February 28, 2007) was an American painter, photographer, sculptor, and filmmaker.

== Early life ==
Nicholas John Hondrogen, Jr. was born in Concord, New Hampshire in 1952, the oldest of five children. He grew up in New Hampshire, studying at Boston's School of the Museum of Fine Arts. There he was a student of the Flemish painter, Jan Cox. Cox encouraged him to finish the 5-year program in 2 years. During that time he also taught etching, lithography, and painting at the Museum School and painted outdoor murals in the Boston area under one of the last WPA programs.

== Career ==
In 1972, Hondrogen moved to the suburbs of Paris and commuted to a tiny garage/studio in Belleville, in the 20th arrondissement. Showing in various group shows, his painting Gymnopedi II was purchased by Centre Georges Pompidou. His first one-person exhibition was sponsored by a grant from the French Ministry of Cultural Affairs in May 1974 at Éspace Pierre Cardin and La Pochade Gallery. From that show, The Museum of Modern Art of Paris purchased his painting Ghost Image No. 9. In 1982, the San Francisco Museum of Modern Art showed his Additive/Subtractive series of photographs.

In the early 1990s, Hondrogen moved to California turning his focus toward filmmaking, producing and directing the award-winning feature documentary Perfect Moment where he asked the question "If you were to die tomorrow what moment would you most remember?" The film includes a diverse cross section of people from talk show host Larry King, actor Vincent Gallo, composer Philip Glass to Vietnam veterans, homemakers and the homeless. The film was awarded the Audience Award at the 1997 Slamdance Film Festival.

After the completion of the film, Hondrogen once again returned to painting. First with his series Mumonkan lasting from 1996 to 2000, then Natural Selection 2000 to 2002 and finally his Fractal Ellipse series from 2002 to 2007. During this period Hondrogen received a Pollock-Krasner Foundation grant for painting.

== Death ==
In 2005, Hondrogen was diagnosed with mesothelioma, a type of cancer that can be caused by exposure to asbestos. It was presumed he came in contact with asbestos while renovating his studios in Paris and New York. For 18 months, he was being cared for by his brother and his wife, John and Ann Hondrogen.

Nicholas Hondrogen died, aged 55, at the Fisher Hospice home a block away from his studio in Amherst, Massachusetts on February 28, 2007. He was cremated and there is no grave.

After his death, The Nicholas Hondrogen Trust was formed to continue to grow his reputation in the art world.

== List of major works ==
- (2004) Fractal Ellipse #30
- (1998) Negotiating/Desperation Diptych
- (1976) Anamorphosis
