= List of people from Exeter, New Hampshire =

The following list includes notable people who were born or have lived in Exeter, New Hampshire.

== Academics and writing ==
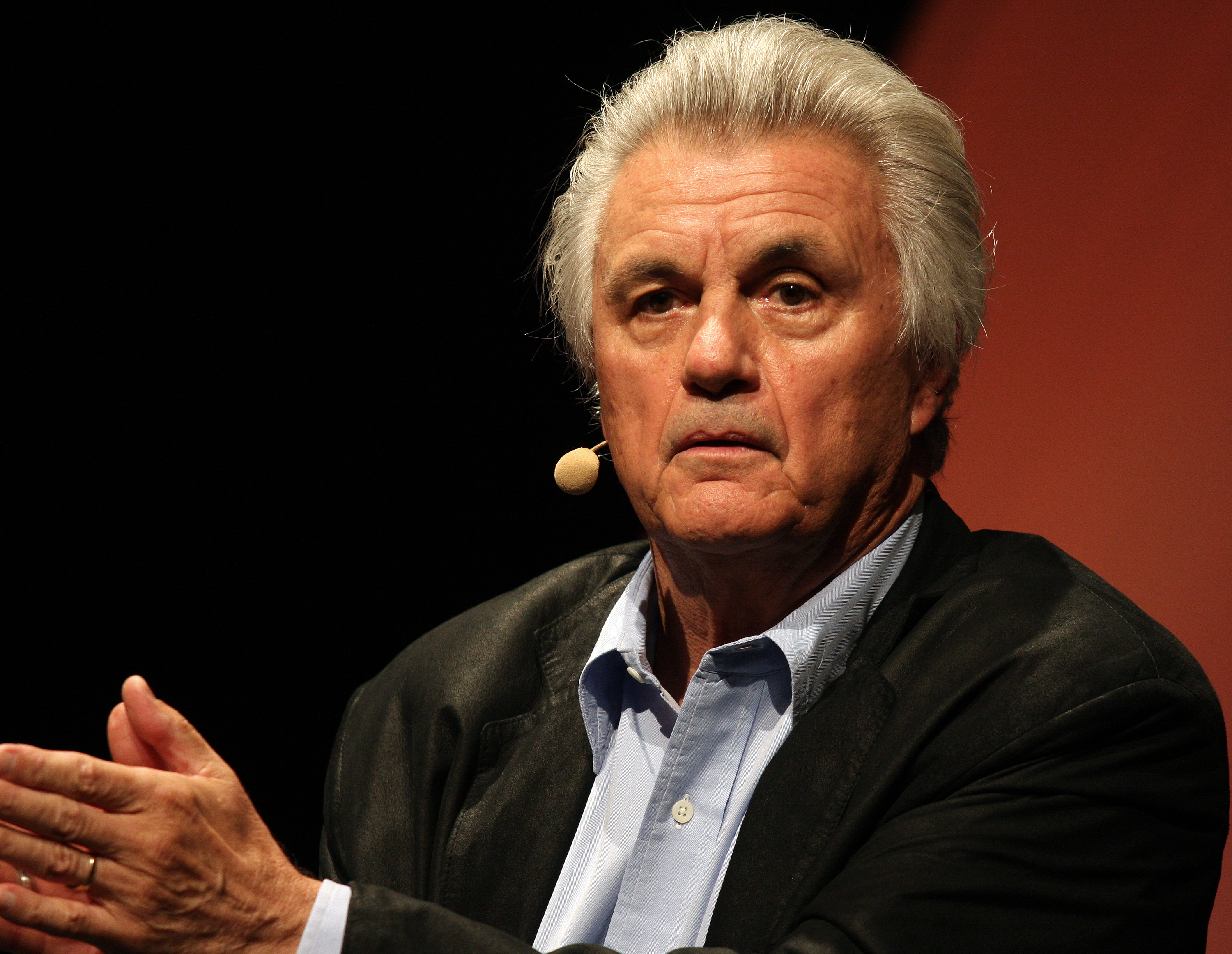
John Irving

- Ralph Borsodi (1888–1977), author, theorist, died in Exeter
- Dan Brown (born 1964), author
- Lisa Bunker, author, NH state representative
- Andrew Coburn (1932–2018), author
- Sidney Darlington (1906–1997), electrical engineer; inventor of the Darlington pair
- William Perry Fogg (1826–1909), author, adventurer
- Michael Golay, historian, author
- Thomas Hassan, 14th principal of Phillips Exeter Academy; husband of New Hampshire Governor Maggie Hassan
- Todd Hearon, poet, musician
- Daniel Heartz (1928–2019), musicologist
- Joe Hill (born 1972), writer
- Charles Snead Houston (1913–2009), mountaineer, medical doctor, Peace Corps administrator, author
- John Irving (born 1942), author
- Dolores Kendrick (1927–2017), author, poet laureate of the District of Columbia, teacher at Phillips Exeter Academy
- John Knowles (1926–2001), author
- Dudley Leavitt (1772–1851), publisher of Farmers Almanack and Miscellaneous Yearbook
- John Phillips (1719–1795), founder of Phillips Exeter Academy along with his wife Elizabeth
- William Robinson (1794–1864), school founder
- Edward L. Rowan (c. 1940), psychiatrist, author, Scouting leader
- Tabitha Gilman Tenney (1762–1837), novelist, proto-feminist
- James Monroe Whitfield (1822–1871), abolitionist poet

== Arts ==
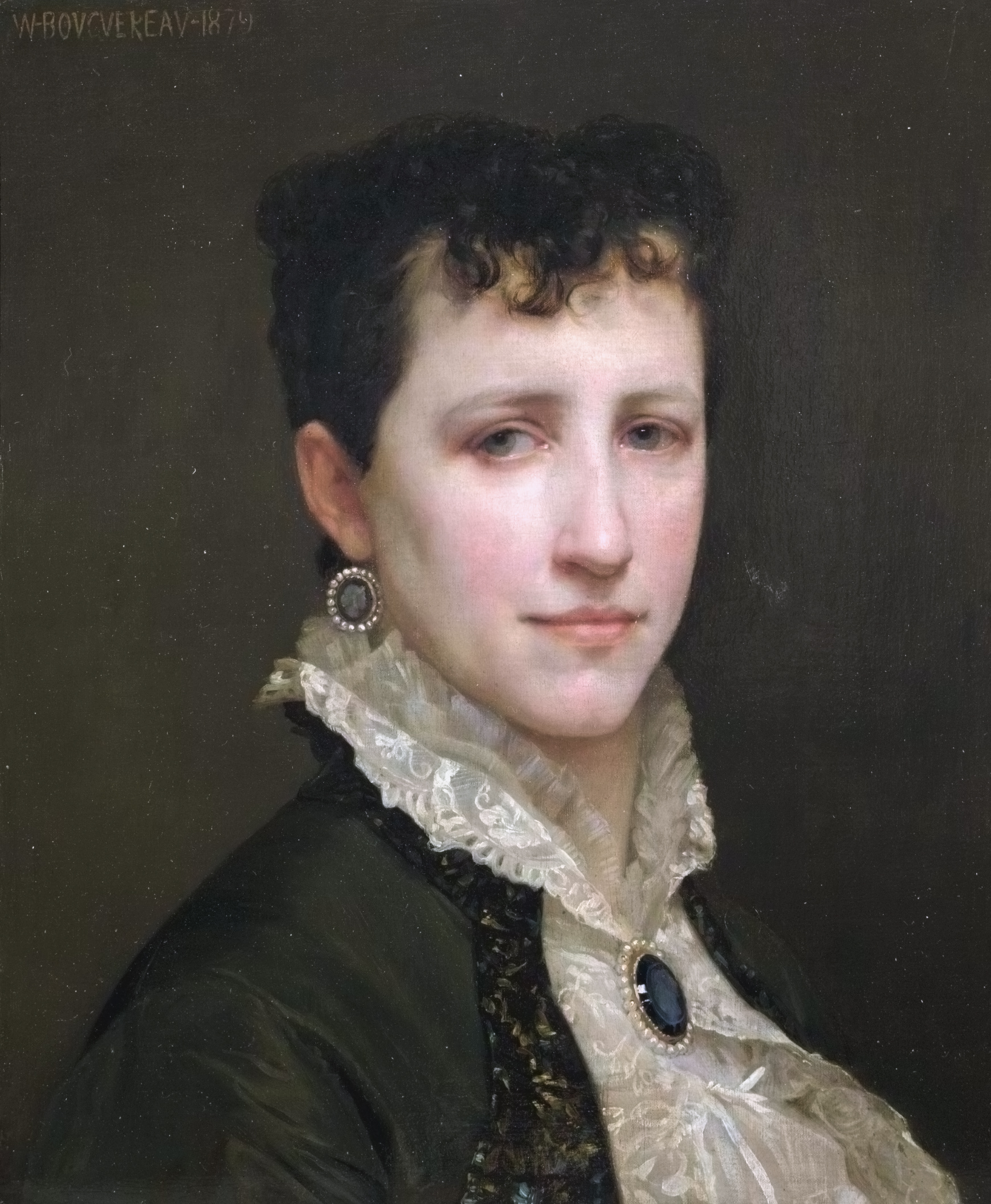
Elizabeth Jane Gardner

- Daniel Chester French (1850–1931), sculptor; Abraham Lincoln at the Lincoln Memorial
- Elizabeth Jane Gardner (1837–1922), painter
- Jack Storms (born 1970), glass sculptor, entrepreneur; uses cold glass (fabricated glass) sculpting process to create his works; his Spectrum Cube and Tear Drop sculptures were used in the Marvel film Guardians of the Galaxy

== Business ==
- Enoch Poor (1736–1780), ship builder, merchant; Continental Army brigadier general
- Ambrose Swasey (1846–1937), mechanical engineer, inventor, entrepreneur, manager, astronomer, philanthropist
- Edward Tuck (1842–1938), banker, diplomat, philanthropist

== Music ==
- Gregory W. Brown (born 1974), musician, pianist
- Daniel Cartier (born 1969), singer and actor
- EpicLLOYD (born 1977), real name Lloyd Ahlquist, internet musician/rapper
- Statik Selektah (born 1982), real name Patrick Baril, DJ, producer, CEO of Showoff Records
- Dan Zanes (born 1961), lead singer of The Del Fuegos and Dan Zanes and Friends

== Politics and law ==
- Frank C. Archibald (1857–1935), Vermont attorney general
- Charles H. Bell (1823–1893), U.S. senator, 38th governor of New Hampshire
- Lewis Cass (1782–1866), 2nd territorial governor of Michigan, president pro tempore of the Senate, 22nd U.S. secretary of state
- Henry Alexander Scammell Dearborn (1783–1851), lawyer, soldier, U.S. congressman from Massachusetts
- Nicholas Emery (1776–1861), judge, legislator from Maine
- Nathaniel Folsom (1726–1790), founding father, merchant, militia general, delegate to the Continental Congress
- John Taylor Gilman (1753–1828), 7th and 12th governor of New Hampshire
- Nicholas Gilman, Jr. (1755–1814), founding father, signer of U.S. Constitution
- Maggie Hassan (born 1958), 81st governor of New Hampshire, U.S. senator
- Adam Lanza (1992–2012), perpetrator of the Sandy Hook Elementary School shooting
- Moses Leavitt (1650–1730), early Exeter settler, selectman, moderator of the General Court
- Gilman Marston (1811–1890), U.S. congressman, senator; Union Army general
- Caesar Nero Paul (c. 1741–1823), ex-slave, soldier and founder of a prominent family of abolitionists
- Tristram Shaw (1786–1843), U.S. congressman
- Henry Shute (1856–1943), lawyer, judge, author of "Plupy Shute" series
- Amos Tuck (1810–1879), attorney and congressman in New Hampshire; a founder of the Republican Party
- Rev. John Wheelwright (c. 1592–1679), clergyman, founder of Exeter

== Religion ==
- Tristram Gilman (1735–1809), minister, descendant of the sixth generation of the town's early settler, Edward Gilman
- Thomas Paul (1773–1831), minister and abolitionist; founder of the First African Baptist Church in Boston, currently known as the African Meeting House

== Sports ==
- Victoria Arlen (born 1994), Paralympian swimmer
- Chris Carpenter (born 1975), pitched for the Toronto Blue Jays and St. Louis Cardinals
- Fred Frame (1894–1962), auto racer, 1932 Indianapolis 500 winner
- Heather Jackson (born 1984), professional triathlete
- Hunter Long (born 1998), tight end for the Miami Dolphins
- Ben Malgeri (born 2000), outfielder for the Detroit Tigers
- Kevin Romine (born 1961), right fielder for the Boston Red Sox
- Timothy Shinnick, Major League Baseball second baseman 1890–1891; played for the Louisville Colonels
