= List of people from Manchester, New Hampshire =

This is a list of people who were born in, residents of, or otherwise closely associated with the city of Manchester, New Hampshire.

== Arts and entertainment ==
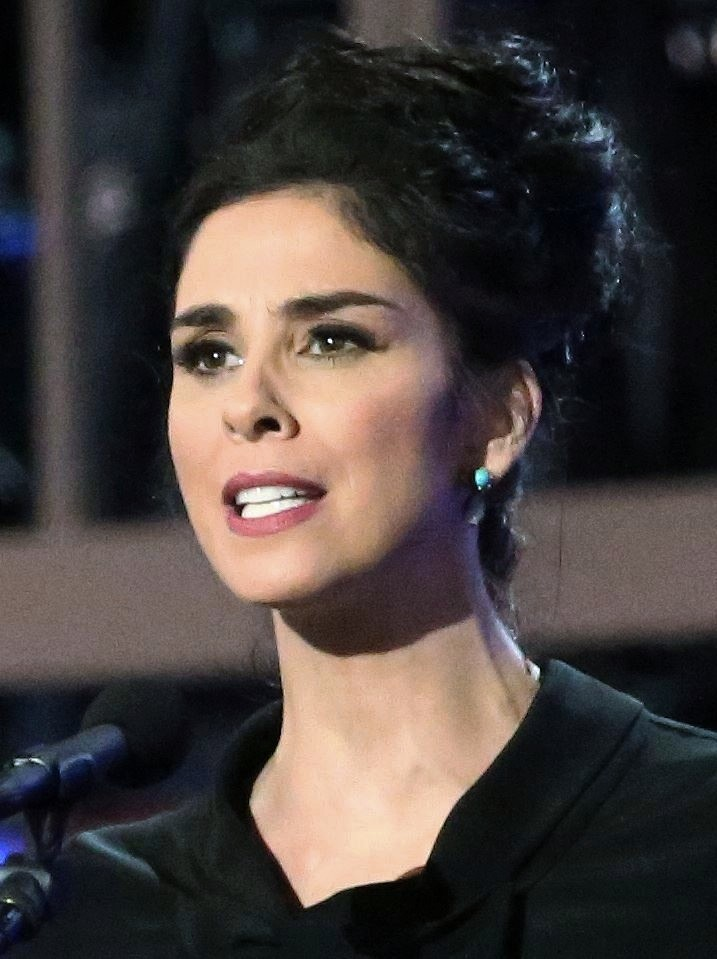
Comedian and actress Sarah Silverman

- GG Allin (1956–1993), punk rock singer; known as the "Madman of Manchester"
- Jane Badler (born 1953), actress (sci-fi series V; several incarnations); 1973 Miss New Hampshire
- Ralph H. Baer (1922–2014), video game developer, inventor, and engineer; known as a "father of video games"
- Janel Bishop (born 1974), Miss New Hampshire Teen USA 1991; Miss Teen USA 1991
- Carl Cameron (born 1961), former Fox News chief White House correspondent; former political director for WMUR-TV 9, Manchester ABC affiliate
- Jay Chanoine (born c. 1985), stand-up comedian
- Louis O. Coxe (1918–1993), poet, playwright, academic
- Matt Czuchry (born 1977), actor (The Resident, The Good Wife, Gilmore Girls and Hack)
- Stephen Dunham (1964–2012), actor (Edward Pillows on DAG)
- Clara Elizabeth Fanning (1878–1938), editor and compiler
- Matt Farley (born 1978), musician and filmmaker
- Toby Fox (born 1991), video game developer, composer
- Betty George (1926–2007), singer
- James Georgopoulos (born 1966), visual artist
- Jennie Lindquist (1899–1977), children's author, editor
- Josh Logan (born 1980), singer; top 12 contestant in the fall 2013 cycle of NBC's The Voice; contestant on the TV talent competition Rock Star: Supernova
- Grace Metalious (1924–1964), author of the classic novel Peyton Place
- Josh Meyers (born 1976), brother of Seth Meyers, comedian and actor, known for MADtv and That '70s Show
- Seth Meyers (born 1973), host of NBC's Late Night With Seth Meyers; former co-presenter of the "Weekend Update" segment on NBC's Saturday Night Live; comedian, actor, comedy writer
- Bob Montana (1920–1975), cartoonist, creator of the characters of Archie Comics
- Patricia Racette (born 1965), international opera soprano
- Adam Sandler (born 1966), actor, comedian, producer
- Sarah Silverman (born 1970), comedian, actress, producer; star of the Comedy Channel's The Sarah Silverman Program; graduate of the Derryfield School
- Christopher Stone (1942–1995), actor (birth name Thomas Bourassa)
- Aaron Tolson, tap dancer, choreographer, professor of dance
- Adelaide Cilley Waldron (1843–1909), author, editor, clubwoman
- Joseph Philbrick Webster (1819–1875), composer

== Business ==
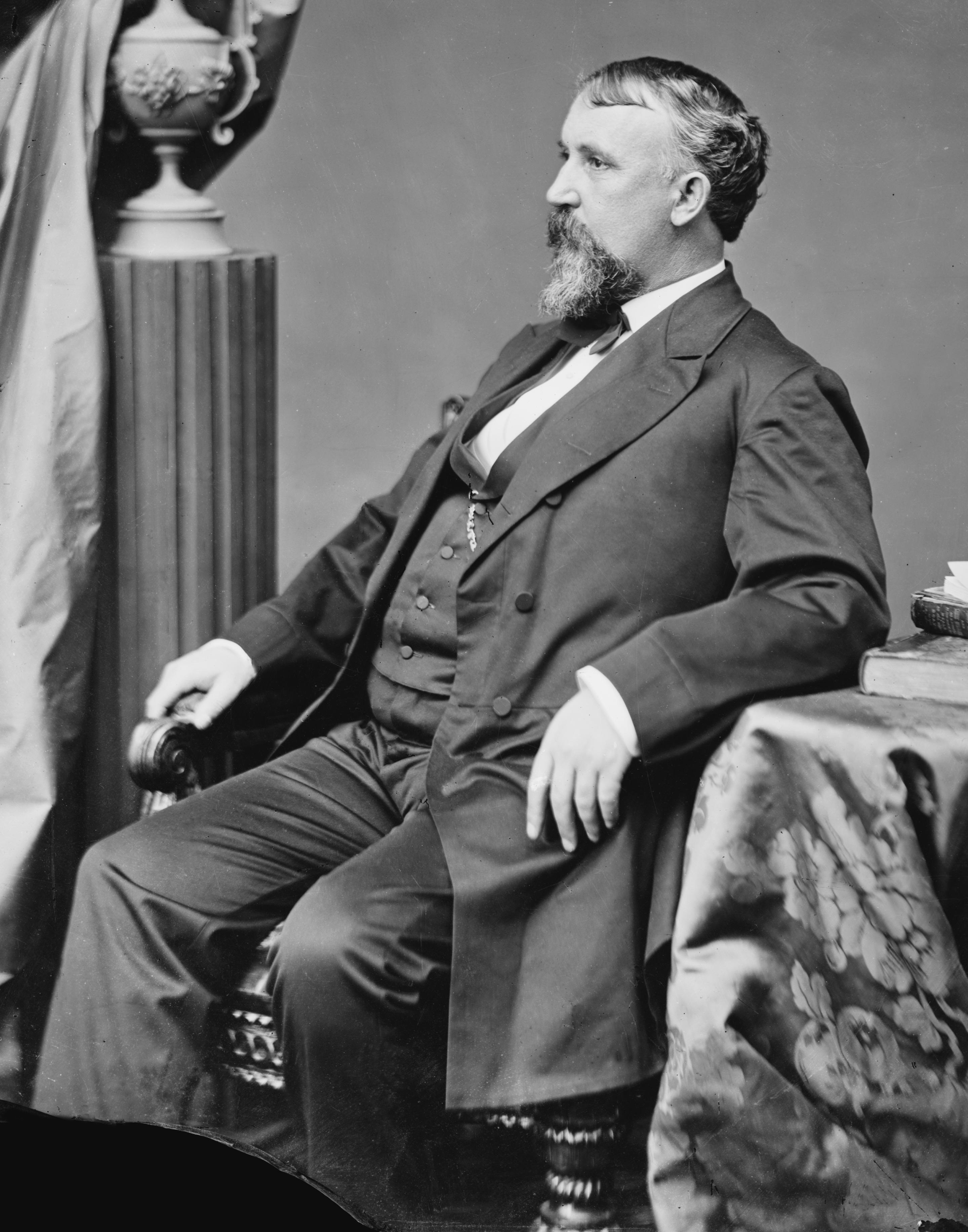
Newspaper editor, Civil War army officer, and later U.S. Senator from North Carolina, Joseph Carter Abbott

- Joseph Carter Abbott (1825–1881), owner and editor of the Manchester Daily American
- Aretas Blood (1816–1897), executive at Manchester Locomotive Works
- Jeremy Hitchcock (born 1981), founder and former CEO of Dyn
- Gary Hirshberg (born 1954), chairman and former president and CEO of Stonyfield Farm, an organic yogurt producer; graduate of the Derryfield School
- Dean Kamen (born 1951), inventor of the iBot and founder of the FIRST Robotics competition (resident of Bedford, company based in Manchester)
- Alyssa LaRoche (born 1979), founder of Aimee Weber Studio Inc.
- Richard McDonald (1909–1998), one half of the McDonald's brothers, entrepreneurs who founded the fast food company McDonald's
- Maurice McDonald (1902–1971), one half of the McDonald's brothers, entrepreneurs who founded the fast food company McDonald's
- Charles Revson (1906–1975), businessman, founder of the cosmetics company Revlon
- Max I. Silber (1911–2004), businessman, scouting enthusiast

== Government ==
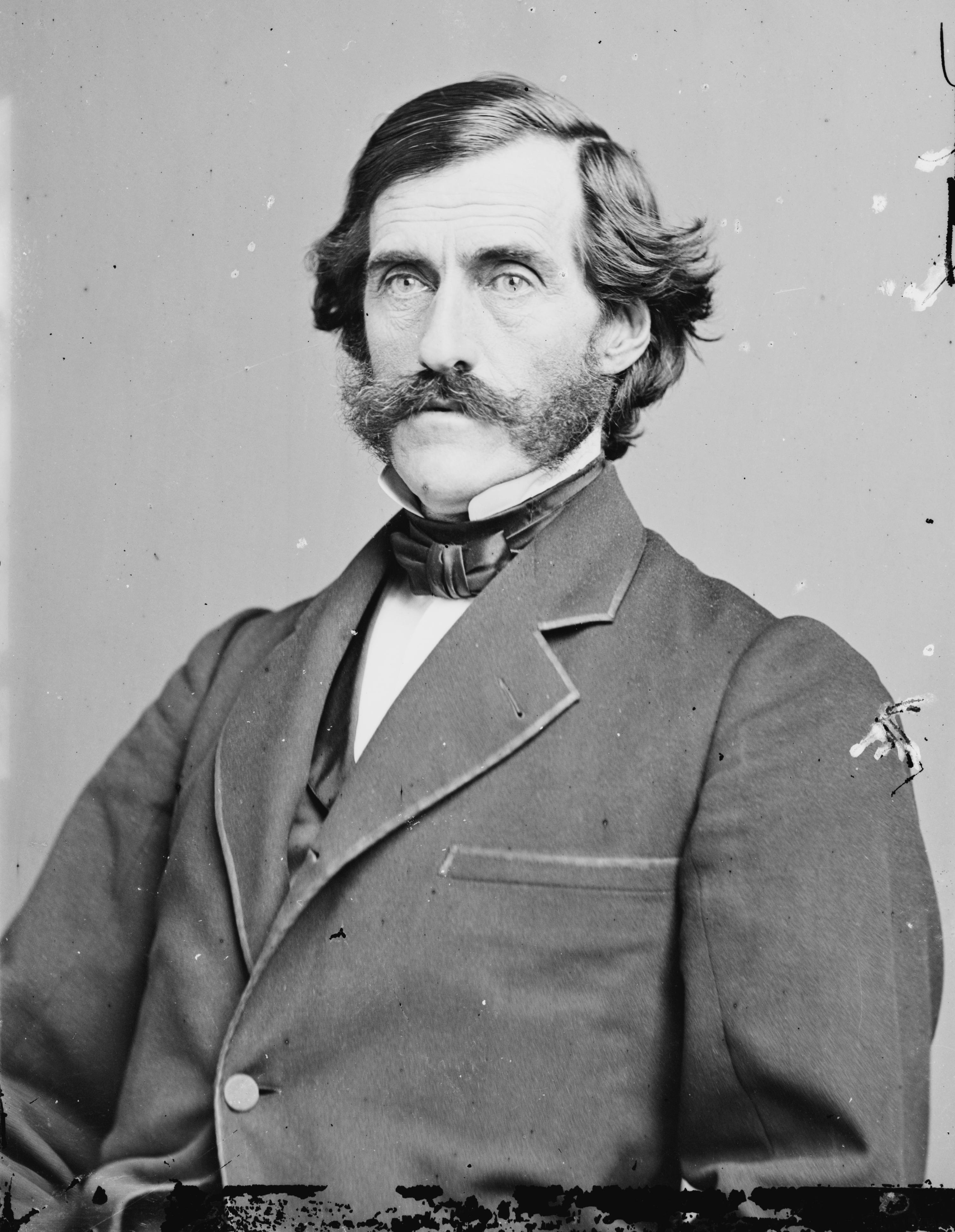
United States Senator Daniel Clark, President pro Tempore during the Civil War

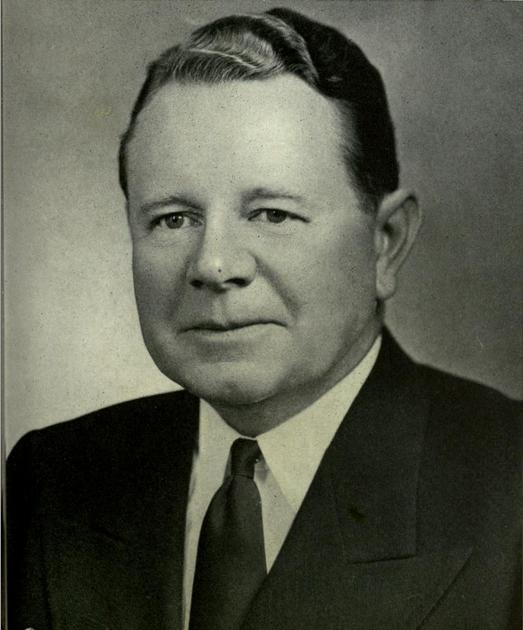
Secretary of the Navy under FDR, John L. Sullivan

- Daniel Adams (1773–1864), physician, author, state legislator
- Emile Beaulieu (1931–2016), mayor of Manchester
- Josephat T. Benoit (1900–1976), mayor of Manchester
- Jay C. Block (born 1970), former candidate for New Mexico governor; current New Mexico state senator
- Albert O. Brown (1852–1937), lawyer, banker and the 58th governor of New Hampshire
- Hiram Brown (1801–1890), first mayor of Manchester
- Raymond Buckley (born 1959), NH Democratic Party chairman
- Henry E. Burnham (1844–1917), U.S. senator
- Sherman Everett Burroughs (1870–1923), U.S. congressman
- Ernest E. Chabot (1922–2019), member of the New Hampshire House of Representatives and United States Postal Service worker
- Person Colby Cheney (1828–1901), industrialist, abolitionist and the 35th governor of New Hampshire
- Daniel Clark (1809–1891), U.S. senator
- Channing H. Cox (1879–1968), politician and the 49th governor of Massachusetts
- Joyce Craig, first female mayor of Manchester
- Moody Currier (1806–1898), lawyer, banker and the 40th governor of New Hampshire; Manchester's Currier Museum of Art is named after him and was founded based on a bequest in his will
- Robert K. Dodge (1928–2017), member of the New Hampshire House of Representatives
- Charles M. Floyd (1861–1923), manufacturer and the 51st governor of New Hampshire
- Ted Gatsas (born 1950), mayor of Manchester and president of the New Hampshire Senate
- Frank Guinta (born 1970), U.S. congressman and mayor of Manchester
- John W. King (1916–1996), lawyer, jurist, state legislator and chief justice of the New Hampshire Supreme Court
- Martin F. Loughlin (1923–2007), chief justice of the New Hampshire Supreme Court and justice of the United States District Court for the District of New Hampshire
- Steve Marchand (born 1974), mayor of Portsmouth, New Hampshire
- Mace Moulton (1796–1867), U.S. congressman
- Chris Pappas (born 1980), U.S. representative with New Hampshire
- Eugene Elliott Reed (1866–1940), U.S. congressman
- Alphonse Roy (1897–1967), U.S. congressman
- Nicholas Sarwark (born 1979), former chairman of the Libertarian Party (2014–2020)
- Edward Clarke Smith (1864–1926), mayor of Manchester
- Donna Soucy (born 1967), member of the New Hampshire Senate
- Barbara Shaw (1942–2021), member of the New Hampshire House of Representatives
- Ezekiel A. Straw (1819–1882), engineer, businessman, and the 34th governor of New Hampshire
- John L. Sullivan (1899–1982), assistant secretary of the treasury under FDR; secretary of the Navy under President Truman
- Charles William Tobey (1880–1953), U.S. senator and congressman; 62nd governor of New Hampshire
- Arthur C. Vailas (born 1951), president of Idaho State University (2006–2018)
- Louis C. Wyman (1917–2002), U.S. congressman

== Military ==
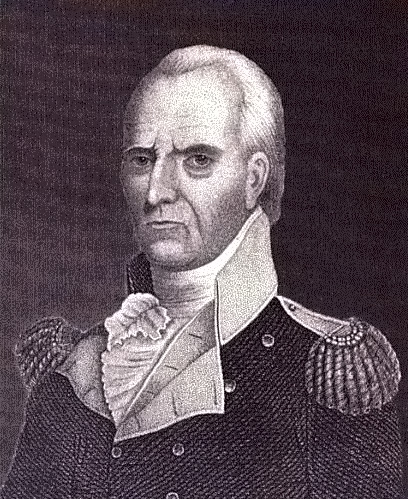
Revolutionary War General John Stark

- Chris Carr (1914–1970), U.S. Army sergeant; Medal of Honor recipient (WWII)
- Robert W. Cone (1957–2016), U.S. Army 4-star general
- Jason K. Fettig (born c. 1974), director, United States Marine Band, 2014–present
- Rene Gagnon (1925–1979), U.S. Marine; helped raise the flag over Iwo Jima (WWII)
- John Goffe (1701–1786), soldier in colonial America; his name is preserved in the name of Goffstown, New Hampshire and the Goffe's Falls neighborhood of Manchester, New Hampshire
- Cyrus A. Reed (1825–1910), adjutant general in Oregon in the 1860s
- John Stark (1728–1822), Revolutionary War-era general; widely known as the "Hero of Bennington" for his exemplary service at the Battle of Bennington in 1777

== Science ==
- Thomas J. Bouchard, Jr. (born 1937), professor of psychology; director of the Minnesota Center for Twin and Adoption Research
- George A. Economou (1923–2003), optical expert; instrumental in the development of the atomic bomb
- Lee M. E. Morin (born 1952), NASA astronaut

== Sports ==
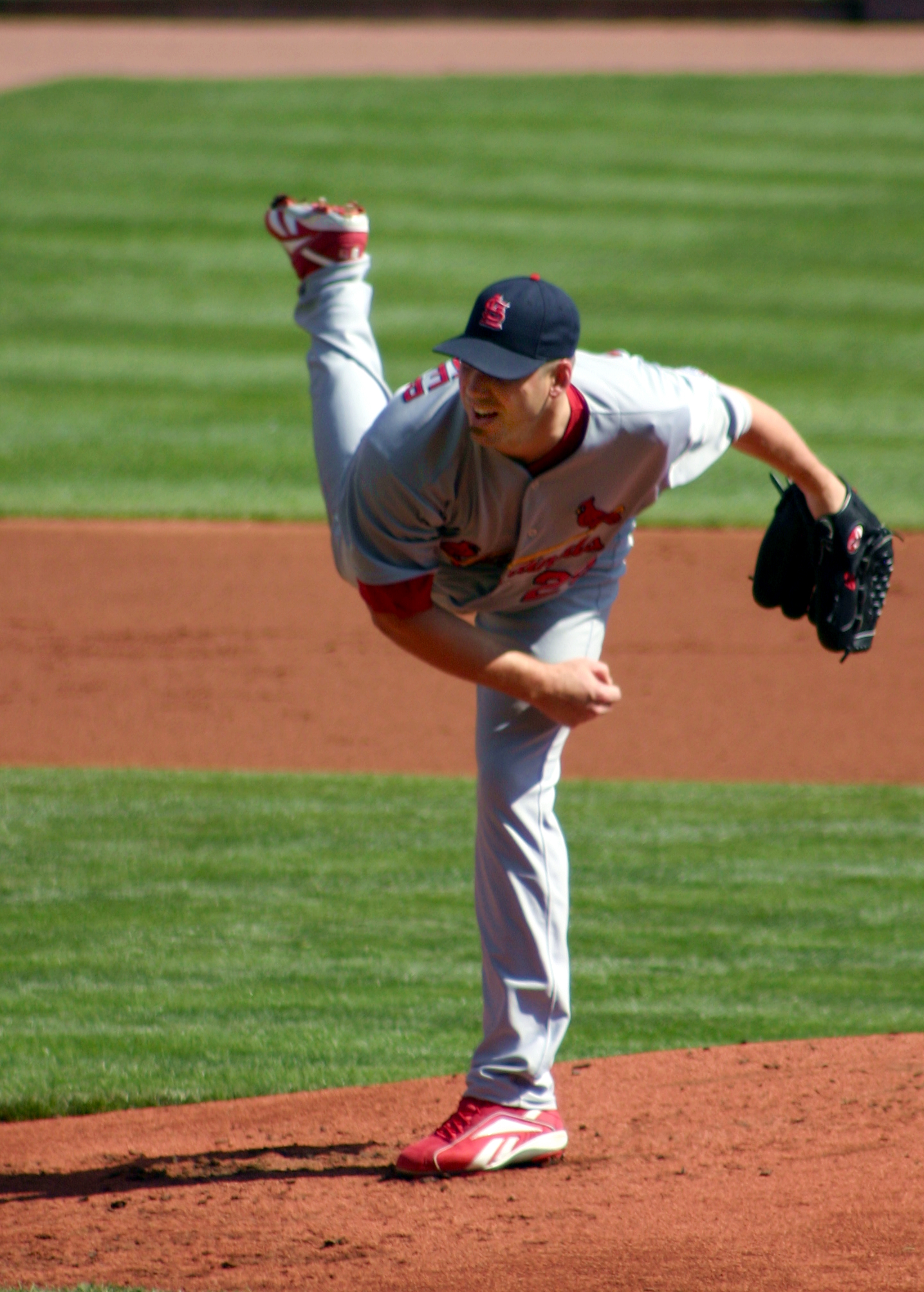
St. Louis Cardinals pitcher Chris Carpenter

- Jamie Aube (born 1953), NASCAR driver
- Steve Balboni (born 1957), first baseman and designated hitter with five MLB teams; World Series champion (1985)
- Courtney Banghart (born 1978), head women's basketball coach at the University of North Carolina
- Chris Carpenter (born 1975), pitcher for the St. Louis Cardinals, recipient of the Cy Young Award; graduate of Trinity High School
- Charlie Davies (born 1986), striker with Sochaux (French Ligue 1) and the USA soccer team
- Ryan Day (born 1979), head coach of Ohio State University football team
- Mike Flanagan (1951–2011), All-Star pitcher with Baltimore Orioles and Toronto Blue Jays; World Series champion (1983)
- Wenyen Gabriel (born 1997), basketball player with the Los Angeles Lakers
- Chip Kelly (born 1963), former head coach of NFL's Philadelphia Eagles, San Francisco 49ers
- Don Macek (born 1954), center with the San Diego Chargers
- Hubie McDonough (born 1963), center with NHL's Los Angeles Kings, New York Islanders, and San Jose Sharks
- Dan Mullen (born 1972), college football head coach at UNLV
- Dave Philistin (born 1986), linebacker with Seattle Seahawks and Kiel Baltic Hurricanes (Germany)
- John Francis "Phenomenal" Smith (1864–1952), pitcher with several MLB teams
- Sherman White (born 1948), defensive end with Cincinnati Bengals and Buffalo Bills, second pick of 1972 NFL draft

== Other ==
- Jennie Collins (1828–1887), labor reformer, humanitarian, suffragist
- Lisa Anne Fletcher (1844–1905), poet, correspondent
- Mariano Gagnon (1929–2017), Franciscan friar, Roman Catholic priest, missionary
- Marie-Josephine Gaudette (1902–2017), supercentenarian, oldest nun ever and oldest living person in Italy
- Emma Blood French (1853–1932), philanthropist
- Alice Hughes (1898–1977), journalist and syndicated fashion columnist
- Bernice Blake Perry (1905–1996), pilot and photographer, first woman to earn a pilot's license in New Hampshire
- Horace Riviere (1887–1942), Union organizer in the 1920s and 30s, head of the New England district of the United Textile Workers of America
