= Katherine Call Simonds =

American singer

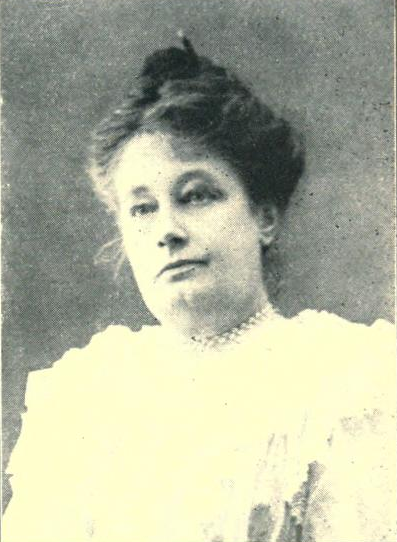
- Born: Katherine Lillian Call; December 12, 1865; Franklin, New Hampshire, U.S.
- Died: January 28, 1946 (aged 80); Concord, New Hampshire
- Occupations: musician, dramatic soprano, composer, songwriter, social reformer
- Spouse: Arthur B. Simonds (m. 1885)
- Writing career
- Notable work: "There's a Soldier Lad in Khaki Over There"

Katherine Call Simonds (née, Call; December 12, 1865 – January 28, 1946) was an American musician, dramatic soprano, composer, songwriter, and social reformer. She gave entire concert programs of her own songs, conducted many choruses and did much general musical work. She was widely known by the songs she wrote and the unusual concerts she gave, her programs consisting entirely of works written by her, both words and music. She served as President of the Franklin and Merrimack County Woman's Christian Temperance Union (WCTU); State Director of Union Music; President of the Franklin Equal Suffrage League; Vice-President of the Golden Rule Farm Homes Association, an Institution for boys. She was a soprano and chorister of the quartette choir of the Christian Church of Franklin and a Member of the Hill Christian Church.

== Early life and education ==
Katherine (sometimes spelled "Catherine") Lillian Call was born in Franklin, New Hampshire, December 12, 1865. She was the daughter of Joseph L. and Martha Ann (Severance) Call.

Simonds received her education in the public schools of Franklin. She studied voice culture with Gertrude Franklin Salisbury and Clara Munger of Boston.

== Career ==
Simonds taught vocal music to large classes. She participated in, and directed, many church choirs. She sang as soprano in the First Baptist Church, Concord, New Hampshire; Franklin Street Congregational Church, Manchester, New Hampshire; Pilgrim Church, Nashua, New Hampshire; Unitarian Church, Franklin; and others. She served as director and soprano of the Christian Church Choir, Franklin.

Simonds was the author and composer of many songs, several of which were published by C. W. Thompson & Co., Boston; two Prohibition songs, “The Nation's Going Dry” and “The Land Where Old Glory Waves," words and music by Simonds, were published by the National WCTU Publishing House, Evanston, Illinois. Her most popular song, "There's a Soldier Lad in Khaki Over There", written, set to music, copyrighted and published in 1919, was sung by her to audiences in many venues, including Tremont Temple, Boston, where twice three cheers were given for the song and singer by the crowd in attendance.

Simonds was an active social reformer. She supported equal suffrage, serving as president of the Franklin Equal Suffrage Club. She was also a Prohibitionist and served as state secretary of the Prohibition Party. She supported the temperance movement, serving as president, Franklin WCTU; president Merrimack County WCTU; and state musical director, New Hampshire WCTU. She was a delegate to the National Prohibition Convention, Saint Paul, Minnesota, 1916, where she sang "The Land Where Glory Waves". She was also a delegate to the National WCTU Convention, Washington, D.C., 1917, where she sang "New Hampshire Voted Dry", written to celebrate the prohibition victory in this state, to a capacity audience in Poli's theatre.

Simonds was the Vice-president, Golden Rule Farm Homes Association, 1916–; and Red Cross singer and delegate to the Inter-Allied Shipping Worker Council in London, 1918. She served as president of the New England Tourist society. In 1931, she was elected president of the New Hampshire division of the League of American Penwomen.

== Personal lilfe ==
On November 25, 1885, she married Arthur B. Simonds, New Hampshire Superintendent of Public Instruction. They made their home in Franklin, but wintered in St. Petersburg, Florida. She died January 28, 1946, in Concord.
