= List of people from Hanover, New Hampshire =

The following list includes notable people who were born or have lived in Hanover, New Hampshire.

== Academics and writing ==
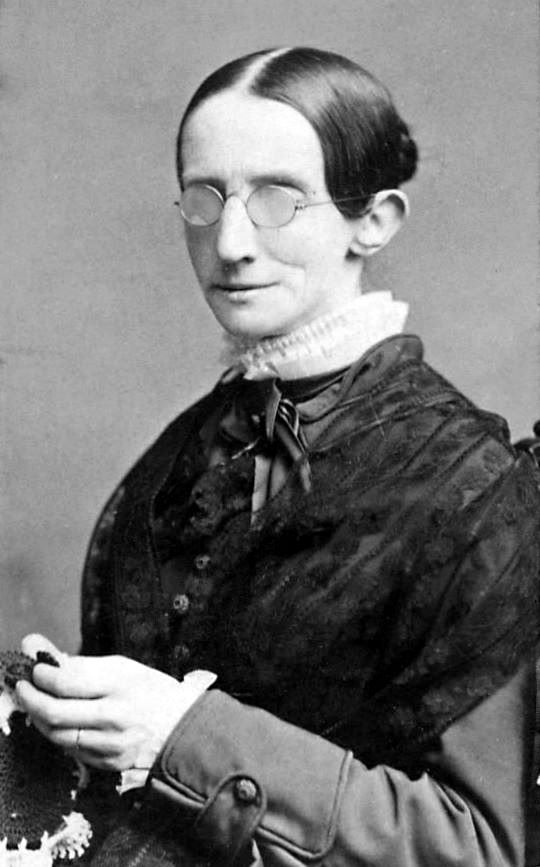
Laura Bridgman

- Philip Booth (1925–2007), poet
- Andy Borowitz (born 1958), writer, comedian, satirist, actor
- C. Loring Brace (1930–2019), anthropologist
- Gerald Warner Brace (1901–1978), writer, educator, sailor, boat builder
- Laura Dewey Lynn Bridgman (1829–1889), first deaf-blind American to gain a significant education in the English language
- Francis Brown (1849–1916), Semitic scholar
- Bill Bryson (born 1951), author
- James Freeman Clarke (1810–1888), preacher, author
- Janet Evanovich (born 1943), writer
- Barbara Newhall Follett (1914–disappeared 1939), author; in December 1939, aged 25, reportedly became depressed with her marriage and walked out of her apartment, never to be seen again
- Richard Foster (1826–1901), abolitionist, educator
- Joan Halifax (born 1942), Zen Buddhist teacher, anthropologist, ecologist, civil rights activist, hospice caregiver, author
- Virginia Heffernan (born 1969), critic, columnist, author
- Terence Hines (born 1951), professor of psychology, author
- Grace Webster Haddock Hinsdale (1832–1902), author
- Paul D. Paganucci (1931–2001), investment banker, university educator, college financial administrator, businessman
- Jodi Picoult (born 1966), author
- Mary Roach (born 1959), author
- Kate Sanborn (1839–1917), author, teacher, lecturer, reviewer, compiler, essayist, farmer
- Armstrong Sperry (1897–1976), writer-illustrator of children's literature
- Eleazar Wheelock (1711–1779), college founder

== Arts ==
- Nicol Allan (1931–2019), artist
- Dave Cole (born 1975), contemporary sculptor

== Business and design ==
- Hal Barwood, game developer
- George Bissell (1821–1884), industrialist
- William Kamkwamba (born 1987), inventor, author
- Olin Stephens (1908–2008), yacht designer

== Media ==
- Jack Beatty (born 1945), writer, commentator
- Tom Dey (born 1965), film director
- Brad Feldman (born 1967), television and radio announcer
- Dana Vespoli, pornographic actress

== Medical ==
- Dixi Crosby (1800–1873), surgeon, educator at Dartmouth College
- C. Everett Koop (1916–2013), Surgeon General of the United States

== Military ==
- Thomas C. Kinkaid (1888–1972), U.S. Navy admiral during WWII

== Music ==
- Sir Babygirl (born 1993), singer, songwriter, guitarist
- Al Barr (born 1968), vocalist for Dropkick Murphys
- Kent Carter (born 1939), jazz musician
- Ken Chastain (born 1964), musician, engineer, producer
- Charlie Clouser (born 1963), keyboardist, composer, record producer, remixer
- Noah Kahan (born 1997), singer-songwriter
- Jon Spencer (born 1965), singer, composer, guitarist

== Politics and law ==
- Amos Noyes Blandin, Jr. (1896–1982), Supreme Court justice, State of New Hampshire
- Henry Fowle Durant (1822–1881), lawyer, philanthropist
- Jonathan Freeman (1745–1808), U.S. congressman
- C. Everett Koop (1916–2013), 13th U.S. Surgeon General
- Sean Patrick Maloney (born 1966), U.S. congressman
- James W. Patterson (1823–1893), U.S. congressman and senator
- James W. Ripley (1786–1835), attorney, Jacksonian U.S. congressman
- Samuel Taggart (1754–1825), U.S. congressman
- Daniel Webster (1782–1852), U.S. congressman, senator from Massachusetts
- Leonard Wilcox (1799–1850), U.S. senator

== Sports ==
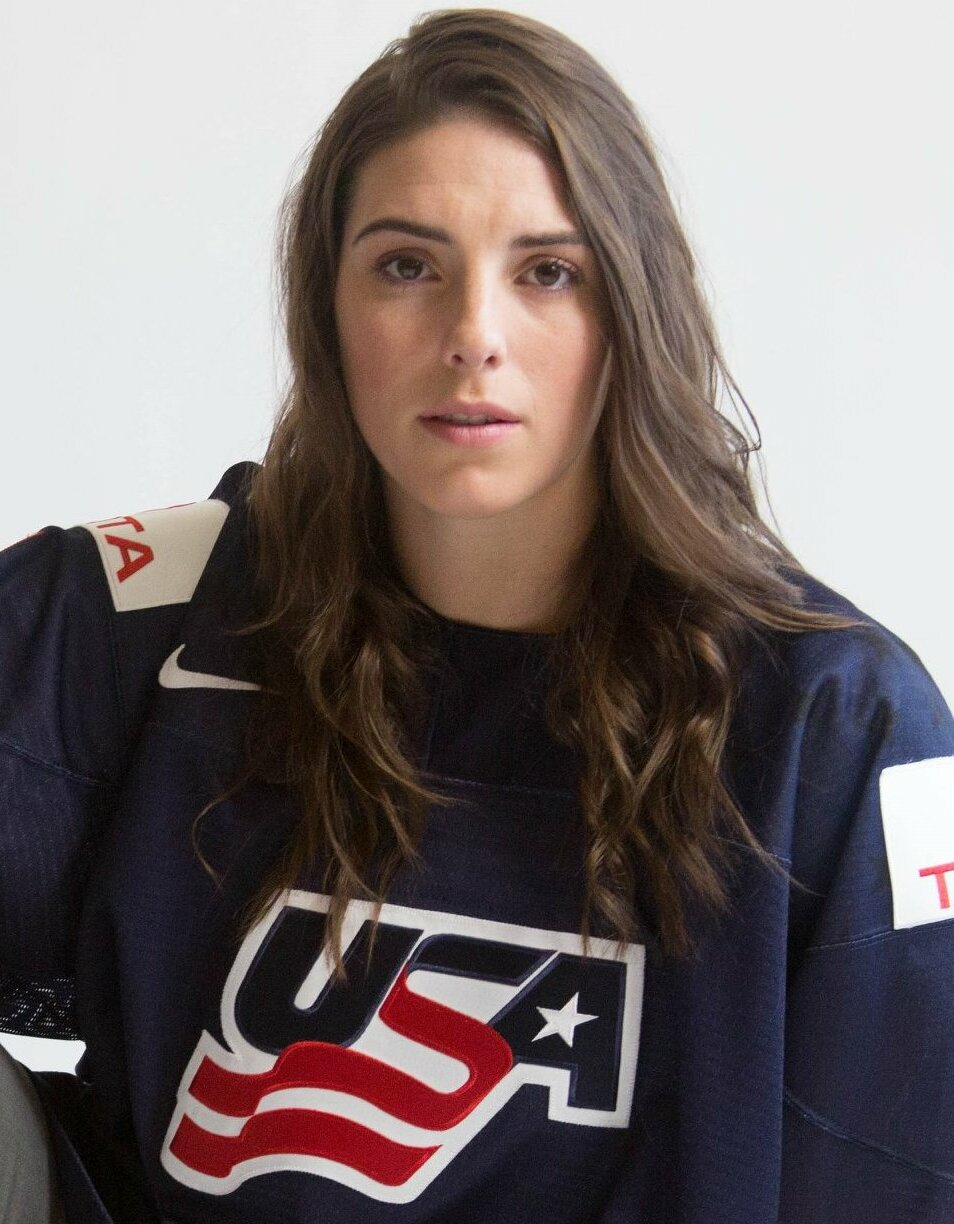
Hilary Knight

- Barbara Bedford (born 1972), Olympic swimmer
- Nate Fish (born 1980), baseball player and coach
- Hilary Knight (born 1989), women's hockey forward; 2010 and 2014 Olympic silver medalist
- Kevin Pearce (born 1987), former professional snowboarder; competed professionally from 2007 to 2009, when a crash during snowboard training left him with a traumatic brain injury
- Ben True (born 1985), runner; World Cross Country Championships silver medalist (2013)
