= Thomas Stickney =

American politician

Col. Thomas Stickney
- Born: June 15, 1729; Bedford, Province of Massachusetts, British America
- Died: January 26, 1809 (aged 79); Concord, New Hampshire, USA
- Burial place: Concord, New Hampshire, USA
- Occupation: Military Officer

Thomas Stickney (June 15, 1729 – January 26, 1809) was an American military officer and statesman born in Bedford, Massachusetts.

He moved to Concord, New Hampshire, as a young man with his father Jeremiah and brother William. Their house was made into a "garrison house" where others could come for protection from Native American raids.

During King George's War, Stickney served under John Goffe in a company of scouts (rangers).

Stickney married Anna Osgood, also of Concord; they had eight children.

On January 20, 1774, Thomas was promoted to Lt. Col. in the New Hampshire Militia and often was moderator of the Concord town meetings. With the start of the American Revolutionary War, Col. Stickney was appointed to the New Hampshire Committee of Safety. In the spring of 1777, Col. Stickney was with his regiment, the 11th New Hampshire Militia Regiment, at Fort Ticonderoga to reinforce the Continental Army garrison there. "Soon after they arrived back in New Hampshire, the regiment was called up to serve in Gen. John Stark's brigade during the Saratoga Campaign. Col. Stickney led his men at the Battle of Bennington, where 2 detachments of British Gen. John Burgoyne's army were defeated. In 1778, Col. Stickney raised men for Gen. John Sullivan for the unsuccessful Battle of Rhode Island.

Thomas Stickney was the moderator at the New Hampshire constitutional convention on October 31, 1783, which ratified the New Hampshire Constitution. He died on January 26, 1809, at his beloved home in Concord.
