= Jim McDermott (illustrator) =

American cartoonist

Jim McDermott cover art for Bluewater Productions's Vincent Price Presents

Jim McDermott (June 24, 1960 in Lowell, Massachusetts) is a New Hampshire-based artist who has illustrated for animation, magazines and comic books.

== See also ==
- List of illustrators
