= List of people from Nashua, New Hampshire =

The following list includes notable people who were born or have lived in Nashua, New Hampshire.

== Academics and writing ==
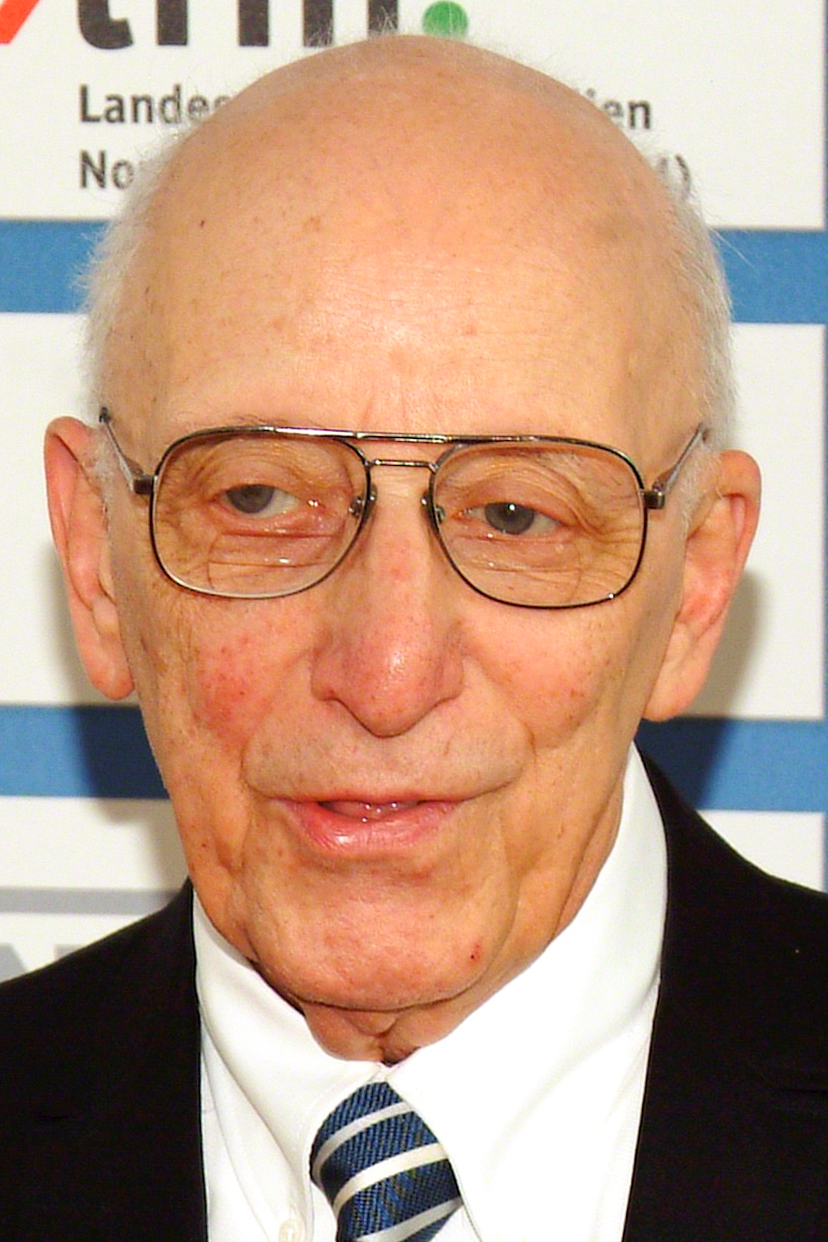
Engineer Ralph H. Baer, inventor of the home video game console

- Jim Collins (born 1965), professor of biological engineering at MIT; MacArthur fellow
- Eliza Hall Kendrick (1863–1930), professor of Biblical studies at Wellesley College
- Hollis Robbins (born 1963), academic, essayist

== Business ==
- Stanley E. Bogdan (1918–2011), founder of S.E. Custom Built, which produced fly reels
- Steve Salis, co-founder of &pizza, and founder of Sizzle Acquisition
- Samuel A. Tamposi (1924–1995), real estate developer

== Inventors ==
- Ralph H. Baer (1922–2014), inventor of the home video game console, credited with contributing to the design of the Simon electronic game
- Deepika Kurup (born 1998), inventor of "A Novel Photocatalytic Pervious Composite for Degrading Bacteria in Wastewater", currently a student at Stanford University
- Thomas Reardon (born 1969), neuroscientist, creator of Microsoft Internet Explorer, co-founder of CTRL-labs

== Arts and media ==
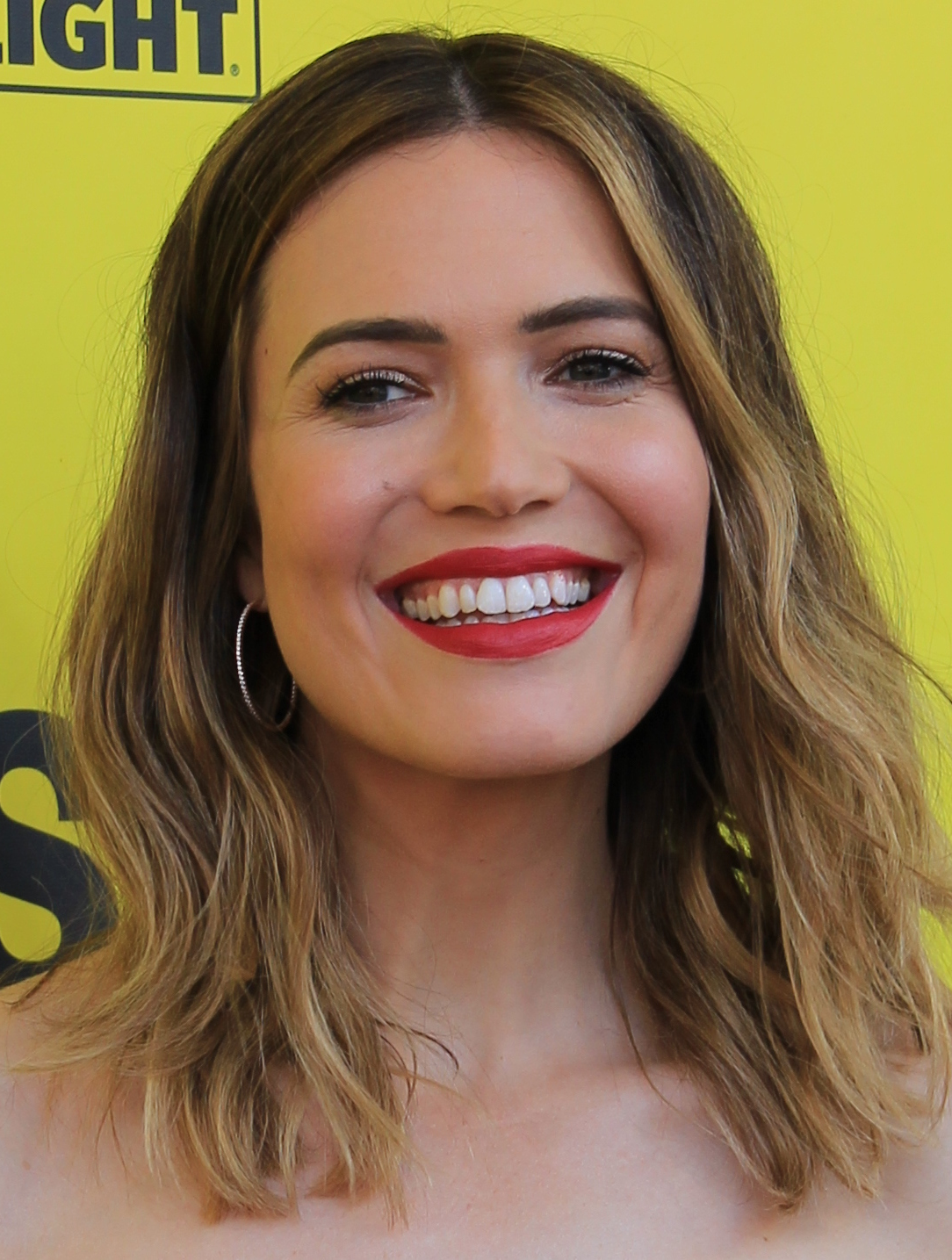
Singer and actress Mandy Moore

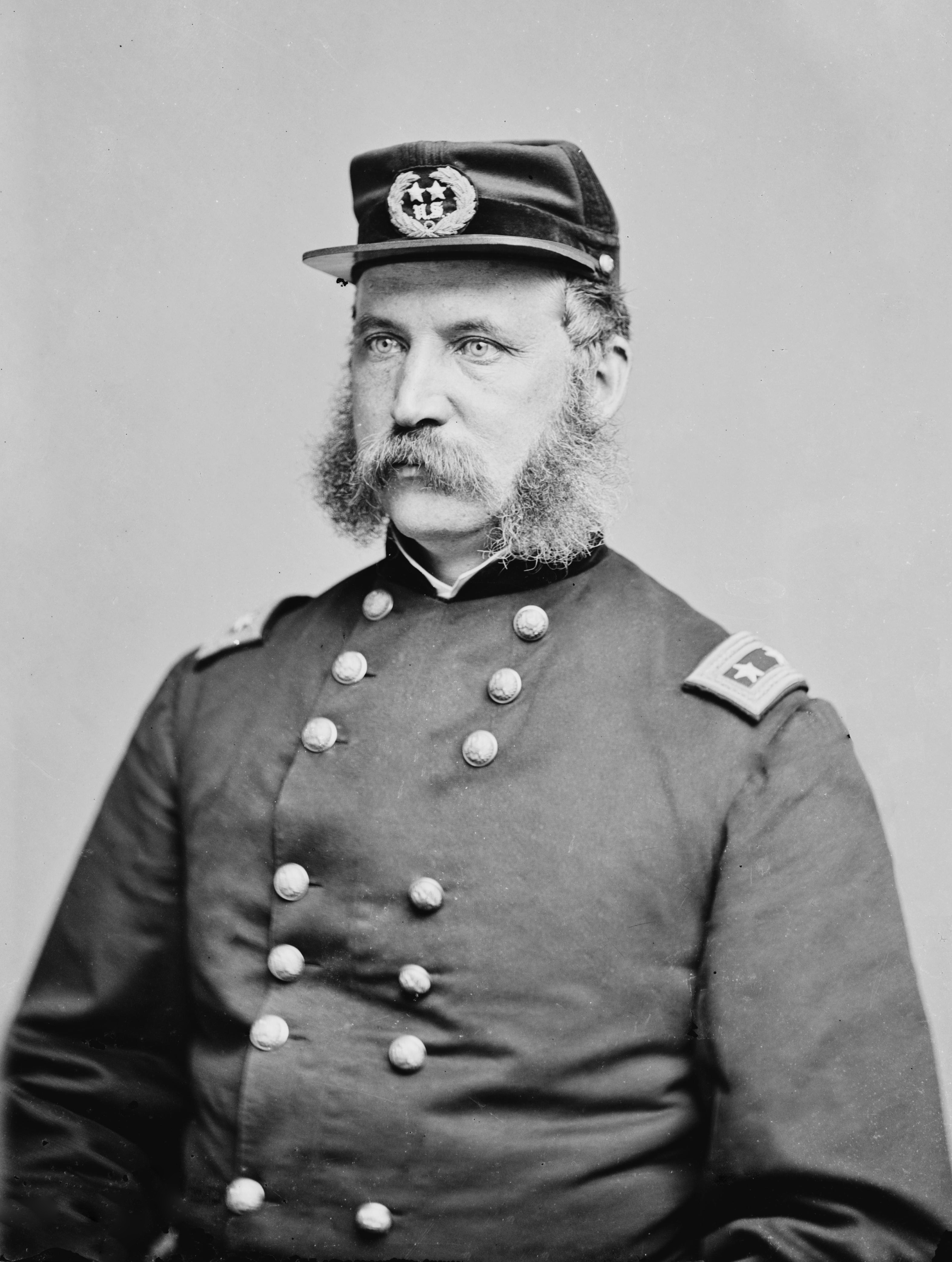
Civil War general and demolitions expert John G. Foster

- Ernie Anastos (born 1943), news anchorman
- Aurore Chabot (born 1949), ceramic artist
- Decap (born 1984), record producer
- Pamela Gidley (1965–2018), actress, model
- Adam Grandmaison (born 1983), more commonly known as Adam22, podcast host
- Michael Graziadei (born 1979), film and television actor (Daniel Romalotti on The Young and the Restless)
- Randy Harrison (born 1977), actor
- Ray LaMontagne (born 1973), Grammy Award-winning singer-songwriter
- Walter Long (1879–1952), actor in films from the 1910s
- Alvin Lucier (1931–2021), composer and sound artist
- Mike Lupica (born 1952), author and former newspaper columnist, best known for his provocative commentary on sports in the New York Daily News and his appearances on ESPN
- Mandy Moore (born 1984), singer and actress; on March 25, 2019, was awarded a star on the Hollywood Walk of Fame
- Kyle Mosher (born 1985), artist, designer known for his collage and cut-paper style
- Sean Murphy (born 1980), comics artist
- Tim Neverett (born 1966), sportscaster
- Mike O'Malley (born 1966), actor (Yes, Dear and Glee)
- Chris Romano (born 1978), actor Blue Mountain State
- Alexandra Socha (born 1990), Broadway actress
- Brady Watt, producer, bass player, bandleader
- Fritz Wetherbee, television host, journalist, author

== Military ==
- George P. Estey (1829–1881), Union Army general during the American Civil War
- John G. Foster (1823–1874), Union Army general during the American Civil War
- John Lovewell (1691–1725), colonial militia captain during Dummer's War
- Harry E. Miller Jr. (born c. 1958), major general who commanded the 42nd Infantry Division
- Ryan Pitts (born 1985), U.S. Army sergeant who received the Congressional Medal of Honor for heroism during the War in Afghanistan

== Politics and law ==
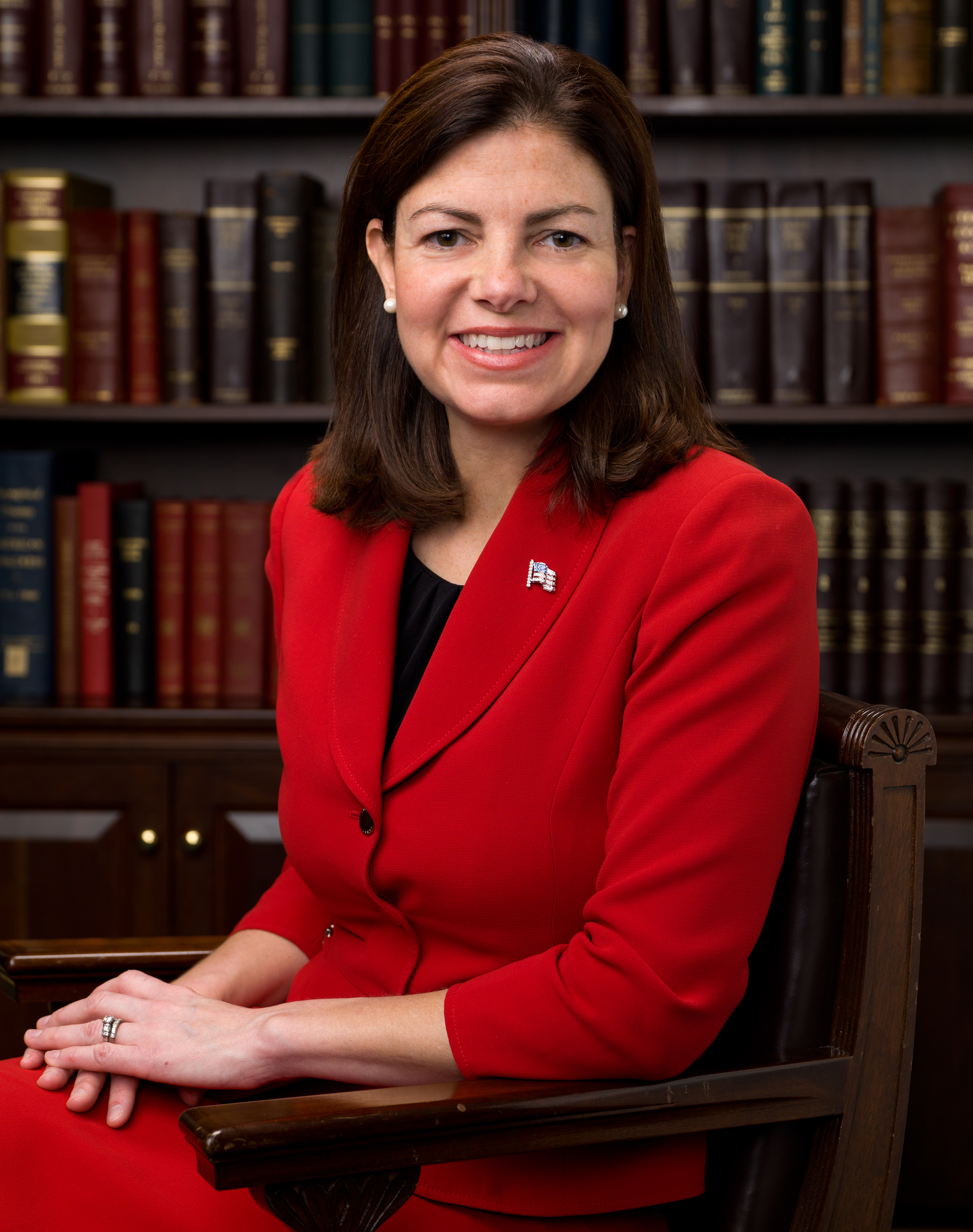
New Hampshire Governor Kelly Ayotte

- Charles G. Atherton (1804–1853), former U.S. senator
- Kelly Ayotte (born 1968), former U.S. senator, current governor of New Hampshire
- William A. Crombie (1844–1914), mayor of Burlington, Vermont
- Stephen S. Cushing (1884–1957), associate justice of the Vermont Supreme Court
- Jim Donchess, mayor of Nashua
- David B. Douzanis (1950–2024), member of the New Hampshire House of Representatives
- Maggie Goodlander (born 1986), U.S. representative for New Hampshire
- Hugh Gregg (1917–2003), former New Hampshire governor and mayor of Nashua
- Judd Gregg (born 1947), former U.S. senator, member of the Republican Party
- Alphonse A. Haettenschwiller (1925–2025), member of the New Hampshire House of Representatives and United States Army Reserve officer
- Tony Labranche (born 2001), youngest member of the New Hampshire House of Representatives as of 2021
- Tom Lanzara, member of the New Hampshire House of Representatives
- Don LeBrun (1935–2025), member of the New Hampshire House of Representatives
- Roujet D. Marshall (1847–1922), judge on the Wisconsin Supreme Court
- Donald McClarren (1938–2021), member of the New Hampshire House of Representatives
- Joshua C. Pierce (1830–1904), Minnesota state legislator and businessman

== Sports ==
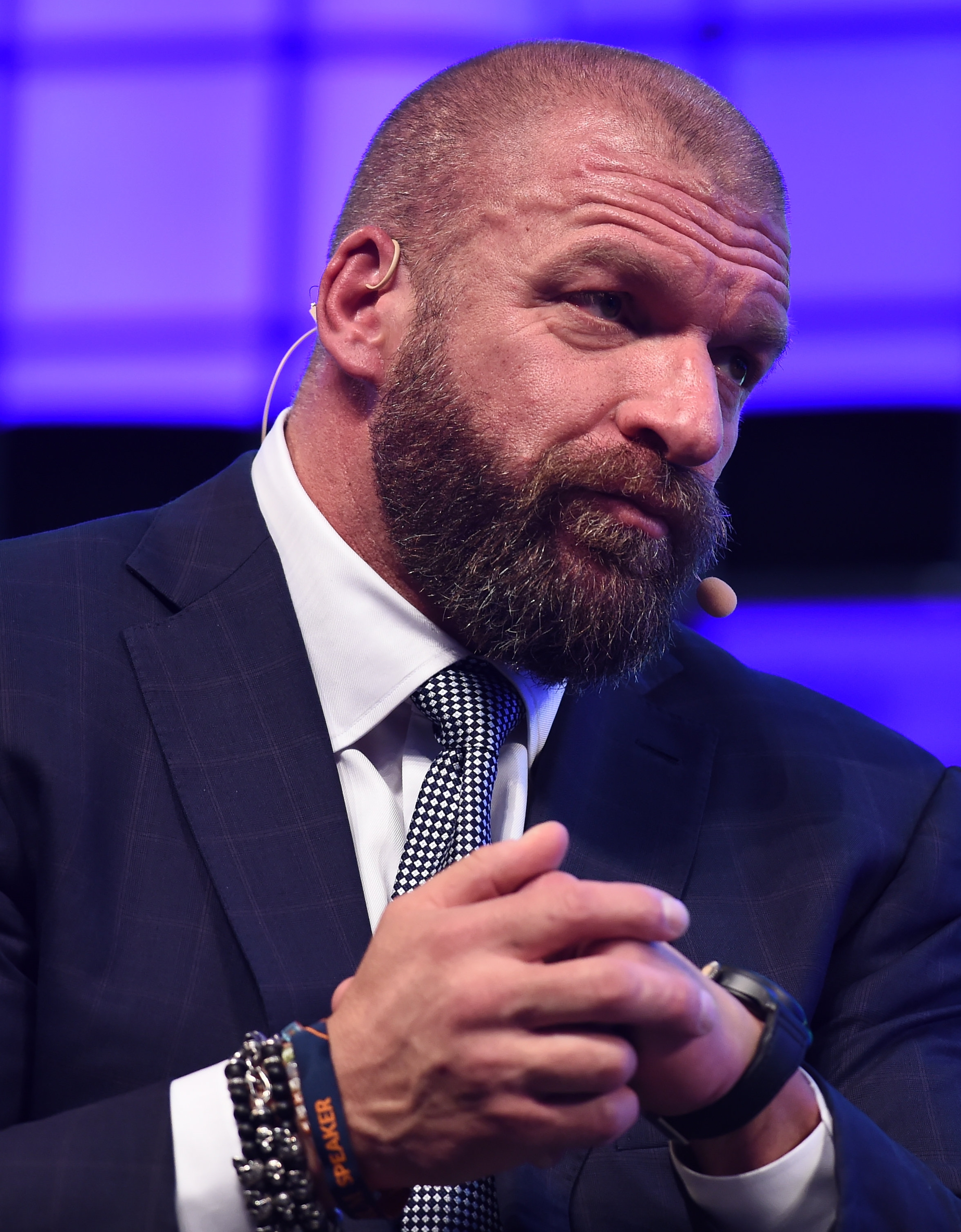
Professional wrestler Triple H

- Ray Dobens (1906–1980), Major League Baseball pitcher who played briefly for the Boston Red Sox during the 1929 season
- Mark Fayne (born 1987), National Hockey League defenseman
- Jeff Giuliano (born 1979), ice hockey left winger for the Los Angeles Kings
- Jay Heaps (born 1976), soccer defender and former head coach for the New England Revolution in Major League Soccer
- Greg Landry (born 1946), football quarterback; played for the Detroit Lions, Baltimore Colts and Chicago Bears
- Paul LaPolice (born 1970), football player and coach
- Paul Levesque (born 1969), professional wrestler, actor and business executive for the professional wrestling promotion World Wrestling Entertainment, known by his ring name Triple H
- Kevin McGowan (born 1991), baseball pitcher; has played for the New York Mets
- Jim McNamara (born 1965), baseball catcher; played parts of two seasons in Major League Baseball as a catcher for the San Francisco Giants in 1992–1993
- Ebuka Okorie (born 2007), NBA Basketball player for the Detroit Pistons
- Ted Phillips, CEO of the National Football League's Chicago Bears
- Kendall Reyes (born 1989), NFL football player
- John Roper (born 1971), baseball pitcher
- Birdie Tebbetts (1912–1999), baseball player, coach, manager of three MLB teams
- Mike Welch (born 1972), baseball pitcher

== Other ==
- Brian Dugan (born 1956), rapist and serial killer active between 1983 and 1985 in Chicago's western suburbs
- Greggory Smart (?–1990), murder victim of Pamela Smart, an American woman who was convicted of conspiracy to commit murder, witness tampering and accomplice to first degree murder; in 1990, at age 22, Smart was accused of conspiring with her underaged sex partner, then 15-year-old William "Billy" Flynn, and three of his friends to have her 24-year-old husband Greggory Smart killed in Derry, New Hampshire
