= List of people from McLean, Virginia =

The following is a list of notable individuals who were born in and/or have lived in McLean, Virginia.

== Arts and entertainment ==
- Mary Schmidt Amons, cast member on Bravo's The Real Housewives of DC
- Michael Arndt, Academy Award-winning screenwriter
- Kathryn Erskine, National Book Award-winning children's author
- James Tiptree Jr., pen name of Alice Sheldon, science fiction author
- Gore Vidal, author and political activist

== Business ==
- Steve Case, co-founder and former chief executive officer and chairman of America Online
- William E. Conway Jr., founder of the Carlyle Group
- Richard Darman, senior Carlyle Group affiliate
- Richard Fairbank, CEO, chairman, co-founder of Capital One
- Najeeb Halaby, CEO of Pan Am, administrator of the Federal Aviation Administration, and father of Queen Noor of Jordan
- Jim Kimsey, co-founder, CEO, and first chairman of America Online
- Ted Leonsis, owner of the Washington Capitals and Washington Wizards, former AOL senior executive
- Daniel Mudd, former CEO of Fortress Investment Group and former president of Fannie Mae
- Steve Salis, co-founder of &pizza, and founder of Sizzle Acquisition
- Dwight Schar, founder and chairman of NVR Inc, America's seventh-largest homebuilder
- Stu Shea, COO of Leidos and founder and chairman of United States Geospatial Intelligence Foundation

== Journalism ==
- Sharyn Alfonsi, correspondent for ABC World News, Good Morning America and Nightline
- Sam Donaldson, former ABC News anchor and Chief White House Correspondent
- Jonathan Karl, TV and print journalism for ABC News (originally from McLean, later in South Dakota and Poughkeepsie, New York)
- Roger Mudd, Emmy Award-winning journalist, television host and former CBS, NBC and PBS news anchor
- Lauren Shehadi, sportscaster for MLB Network and Turner Sports
- Derek Thompson, staff writer for The Atlantic

== Judiciary ==
- Anthony Kennedy, Supreme Court Justice
- Liam O'Grady, United States District Court judge
- Charles S. Rhyne lawyer who argued landmark case Baker v. Carr
- Antonin Scalia, Supreme Court Justice

== Military ==
- William A. Beiderlinden, U.S. Army major general
- Arnold W. Braswell, retired lieutenant general of the United States Air Force
- Frederic J. Brown II, U.S. Army lieutenant general
- Frederic J. Brown III, U.S. Army lieutenant general
- Major General John V. Cox, Marine Corps fighter pilot and naval aviator
- Vice Admiral Forrest S Petersen USN, naval aviator and X15 pilot
- General Colin Powell, former secretary of state

== Politics ==
- Spencer Abraham, 10th Secretary of Energy and Republican United States senator from Michigan (1995–2001)
- Elliott Abrams, special assistant to former President Bush
- Bandar bin Sultan Al Saud, former Saudi ambassador to the United States
- Prince Turki bin Faisal Al Saud, former Saudi ambassador to the United States
- Joe Allbaugh, campaign manager for George W. Bush
- Jacqueline Bouvier, wife of John F. Kennedy
- Zbigniew Brzezinski, National Security Advisor to Jimmy Carter
- Pat Buchanan, political analyst.
- Frank Carlucci, former secretary of defense, former chairman of the Carlyle Group
- Dick Cheney, former vice president of the United States
- Elizabeth Cheney, daughter of former Vice President Dick Cheney and Lynne Cheney
- Lynne Cheney, former Second Lady of the United States
- John Dingell, dean of the United States House of Representatives
- Senator Byron Dorgan
- Newt Gingrich, former speaker of the House
- Chuck Hagel, United States secretary of defense
- Jon Huntsman Jr., former governor of Utah and presidential candidate
- Laura Ingraham, Fox News host and conservative political commentator
- Frank Keating, former governor of Oklahoma
- Ethel Kennedy
- Ted Kennedy, senior United States senator from Massachusetts
- Bill Kristol, political analyst
- Patrick Leahy, United States senator from Vermont
- Mike Lee, junior United States senator from Utah
- I. Lewis "Scooter" Libby, lawyer, and former chief of staff to Vice President Dick Cheney (2001–2005)
- Fred Malek, former assistant to United States presidents George H.W. Bush and Richard Nixon
- Terry McAuliffe, governor of Virginia and former chairman of the Democratic National Committee
- Luke Messer, member of the United States House of Representatives
- Don Nickles, former Republican senator from Oklahoma
- Queen Noor of Jordan
- Chuck Robb, former United States senator and governor of Virginia
- Mark Rosenker, former chairman of the National Transportation Safety Board and Major General USAF (ret)
- Amha Selassie, last emperor of Ethiopia
- John E. Sununu, former United States senator from New Hampshire
- Nicholas Veliotes, former United States ambassador to Egypt and Jordan
- Jean Zermatten, chairman of the U.N. Committee on the Rights of the Child; son of famous Swiss writer Maurice Zermatten
- Tom Cotton, United States Senator representing Arkansas.

== Science ==
- Herman Aguinis, professor at the George Washington University School of Business, and Past President of the Academy of Management
- Vint Cerf, computer scientist, internet pioneer, considered one of "the fathers of the Internet"
- Mark Lawrence, American psychiatrist and CIA profiler

== Sports ==
- Bradley Beal, shooting guard for the Washington Wizards
- Eric Dorsey, former defensive end for the New York Giants; attended high school in McLean
- Kevin Hogan, quarterback for the Washington Redskins
- T. J. Oshie, right winger for the Washington Capitals
- Alexander Ovechkin, captain of the Washington Capitals
- Josh Sborz, pitcher for the Los Angeles Dodgers organization
- Max Scherzer, pitcher for the Washington Nationals organization
