= Nashua High School South =

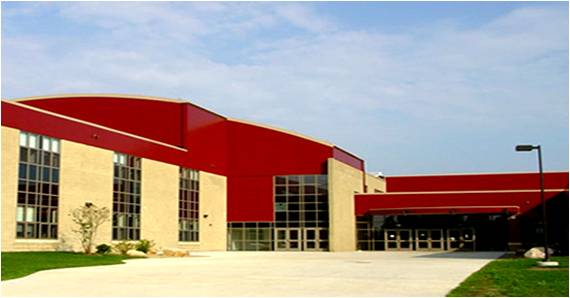

Location
- 36 Riverside Drive; Nashua, New Hampshire 03062-1395; United States; 42°45′12″N 71°29′45″W

Information
- Type: Public high school
- Motto: "Where Panthers Roar and Students Soar"
- Established: 2004; 22 years ago
- School district: Nashua School District
- Superintendent: Mario Andrade
- Principal: Keith Richard
- Teaching staff: 142.50 (on an FTE basis)
- Grades: 9–12
- Gender: Coeducational
- Enrollment: 1,635 (2023–2024)
- Student to teacher ratio: 11.47
- Campus: Suburban
- Colors: Purple; silver; white
- Team name: Panthers
- Website: nashua.edu/South

Nashua High School South, formerly known as Nashua Senior High School, is a public high school located in Nashua, New Hampshire. The school's current location was erected in 1975 with its first class graduating in June 1976. The school was remodeled between 2002 and 2004 when a second school, Nashua High School North, was built. The existing high school building was renamed Nashua High School South. The school serves approximately 1800 students, making it the largest public high school in New Hampshire, and the second largest high school overall, after the private Pinkerton Academy.

== History ==
Nashua Senior High School (as the south campus was referred to prior to the split in 2004) has been located at three different locations throughout the city, originally at a location at Spring Street (the site is now occupied by the Hillsborough County Superior Courthouse South), followed by the building that is now Elm Street Middle School, before finally coming to the current location on Riverside Drive. The campus, located on the southeast side of the Nashua River, is in fact located slightly farther north than Nashua High School North, located on the northwest side of the river.

From the 1975-76 school year through the 2004–05 school year, the Nashua School District followed a non-standard system that had the high school comprising grades 10 through 12, with grade 9 being held in with the city's three junior high schools (now following the middle school system/curriculum). During the 2002–03 and 2003–04 school years, juniors and seniors attended classes at the newly constructed Nashua High School North campus and sophomores attended school at the South location while it was being renovated. Meanwhile, freshmen still attended class at their respective junior high schools, but received credit and report cards from Nashua High. Finally, in the 2004–2005 school year, the 9th through 12th grades were held at both high schools.

=== 1980 Republican presidential debate ===
In February of 1980, the school was the chosen venue for a Republican presidential debate between Ronald Reagan and George H. W. Bush, the top two contenders for the Republican nomination; the debate was funded by the Reagan campaign and hosted by the Nashua Telegraph, but was originally slated to have only Reagan and Bush until they both requested that all candidates be allowed to participate, which Reagan also funded. At the beginning of the debate, during a discussion over which candidates were being allowed to take part, Telegraph editor Jon Breen, acting as the moderator, ordered Reagan's microphone be turned off; Reagan rebuked him saying, "I am paying for this microphone, Mr. Green!" [sic]. The rebuke became a standout moment in New Hampshire primary history; the remark was wildly cheered by the audience and even applauded by most of Reagan's opponents.

=== 2008 presidential campaign ===
Nashua High South briefly was in the public eye during 2007–2008 of the United States presidential campaign. Alex Chen, valedictorian of the class of 2009, wrote to all the candidates running in both the Democratic and Republican primaries and invited them to come to the school to speak. Most of the primary candidates, including Hillary Clinton, Barack Obama, John McCain and Ron Paul, accepted his invitation. They gave speeches and answered questions from the school's auditorium as well as gave televised interviews with the Nashua Telegraph in the school's TV studio. In 2008, after his defeat in the New Hampshire Democratic primary, Barack Obama gave his famous "Yes We Can" speech in the school's gym. In 2010 President Obama returned to the Nashua School District for a public forum on job creation, but for security reasons, the forum was held at Nashua High School North instead.

== Athletics ==
Nashua High School South offers students the opportunity to participate in various sports teams through its athletic program. The school fields teams in sports such as football, basketball, baseball, softball, soccer, volleyball, and wrestling.

The school's athletic teams, known as the "Panthers," compete in the NHIAA Division I conference, the highest level division reserved for the largest schools in the state. Most recently, the division one boys' soccer team took first place in the 2021 and 2022 state championships.

In addition to its competitive teams, Nashua High School South also offers opportunities for students and athletes to use their athletic facilities, including two large-sized gymnasiums, a weight room, and athletic fields, which allow students to engage in physical activity and participate in intramural sports.

=== Nathaniel Tejeda aka "Smiley" ===
On January 6, 2020, Nashua High School South underwent a renovation and upgrade of its weight room in honor of former student Nathaniel Tejeda, also known as "Smiley." The renovation was made possible through the efforts of the Make-A-Wish Foundation in response to Tejeda's lymphoma diagnosis in March 2020. As a result, the 2019 graduate was able to have the Nashua South weight room entirely refurbished.

== Academics ==
Subjects at Nashua High School South are divided into eight departments: English, Social Studies, Information and Computer Technology, Science, Mathematics, Health, Physical Education, and Fine Arts. Students are given the option to take courses at the "Foundations," "Extensions," "Honors," or "Advanced Placement" level.

Nashua High School South is ranked 36th among all New Hampshire high schools. About 34% of its students participate in Advanced Placement coursework and exams. Within all schools in the United States, Nashua High School South is ranked #6,348 out of approximately 18,000 schools.

The school has five class periods daily, starting at 7:20 am until 2:03 pm. The class schedule refers to each class period as "blocks." Each block has an allocated 68 minutes of class time. One of these blocks is study hall, where students are supposed to complete their homework. South teachers are also available for extra help and tutoring after school.

=== School clubs ===
Nashua High School South has over 80 clubs available for students to get involved in. Clubs are run by faculty advisors who provide their classroom space for the club and oversee any meetings. Clubs are Nashua High School South are mostly led by students. Some clubs elect presidents and vice presidents to establish a formal structure.

Some of the school's clubs include the Programming Club, which competes in American Computer Science League competitions, and the school robotics team participates in FIRST Robotics Competitions.

== Demographics ==
Enrollment by Race/Ethnicity
School Year	American Indian / Alaska Native	Asian	Black	Hispanic	Native Hawaiian / Pacific Islander	White	Two or More Races
2020–21	1 (0.1%)	243 (13.3%)	79 (4.3%)	471 (25.7%)	0 (0%)	970 (52.9%)	68 (3.7%)

Enrollment by gender (2020–21)
Gender	Enrolled pupils	Percentage
Female	878	47.93%
Male	954	52.07%
Non-binary	0	0%
Total	1,832	100%

Enrollment by grade (2020–21)
Grade	Enrolled pupils	Percentage
9	547	29.86%
10	443	24.18%
11	436	23.8%
12	406	22.16%
Ungraded	0	0%
Total	1,832	100%

== Notable alumni ==
As of the start of the 2004–2005 school year, anyone who graduated from the school when it was simply known as Nashua High School is considered an alumnus of Nashua High School South (including those who attended classes at the North campus until 2004). Notable alumni include:

- Kole Ayi (1997), former NFL player
- Kelly Ayotte (1986), former U.S. senator from New Hampshire (2011-2017) and incumbent governor (2025-)
- Michelle Caruso-Cabrera, (1987) CNBC anchor and political candidate
- Ken Gidge (1964), artist, inventor and long-time state representative
- Adolph Kissell (1938), former NFL halfback for the Chicago Bears (1942)
- Deepika Kurup (2015), Discovery Education 3M Young Scientist Challenge (2012) and United States Stockholm Junior Water Prize (2014) winner
- Greg Landry (1964), starting quarterback for the Detroit Lions for many years
- Paul LaPolice (1989), college coach at UNH, Maine Maritime and RPI; CFL coach at Toronto, Hamilton, Saskatchewan and Winnipeg; current TSN analyst
- Paul Levesque (1987), professional wrestler and wrestling executive, competed as Triple H for WWE.
- Kyle Mosher (2004), artist
- Jeff Motuzas (1990), current bullpen catcher for the Arizona Diamondbacks
- Alexandra Socha (2008), actress; starred in the Broadway musical Spring Awakening
- Madeline Amy Sweeney (1984), American Airlines flight attendant during September 11, 2001 terrorist attack
- Birdie Tebbetts (1930), Major League Baseball player and manager
- Mike Welch (1990), former pitcher for the Philadelphia Phillies
- Ray Dobens (1925), former pitcher for the Boston Red Sox, general manager Nashua Dodgers (1946-47)
- Steve Salis, co-founder of &pizza, and founder of Sizzle Acquisition
- Colby Martel, YouTuber and content creator
