= Kramers (bookstore) =

Independent bookstore in Dupont Circle, Washington, D.C., United States

Coordinates: 38.9108°N 77.0438°W

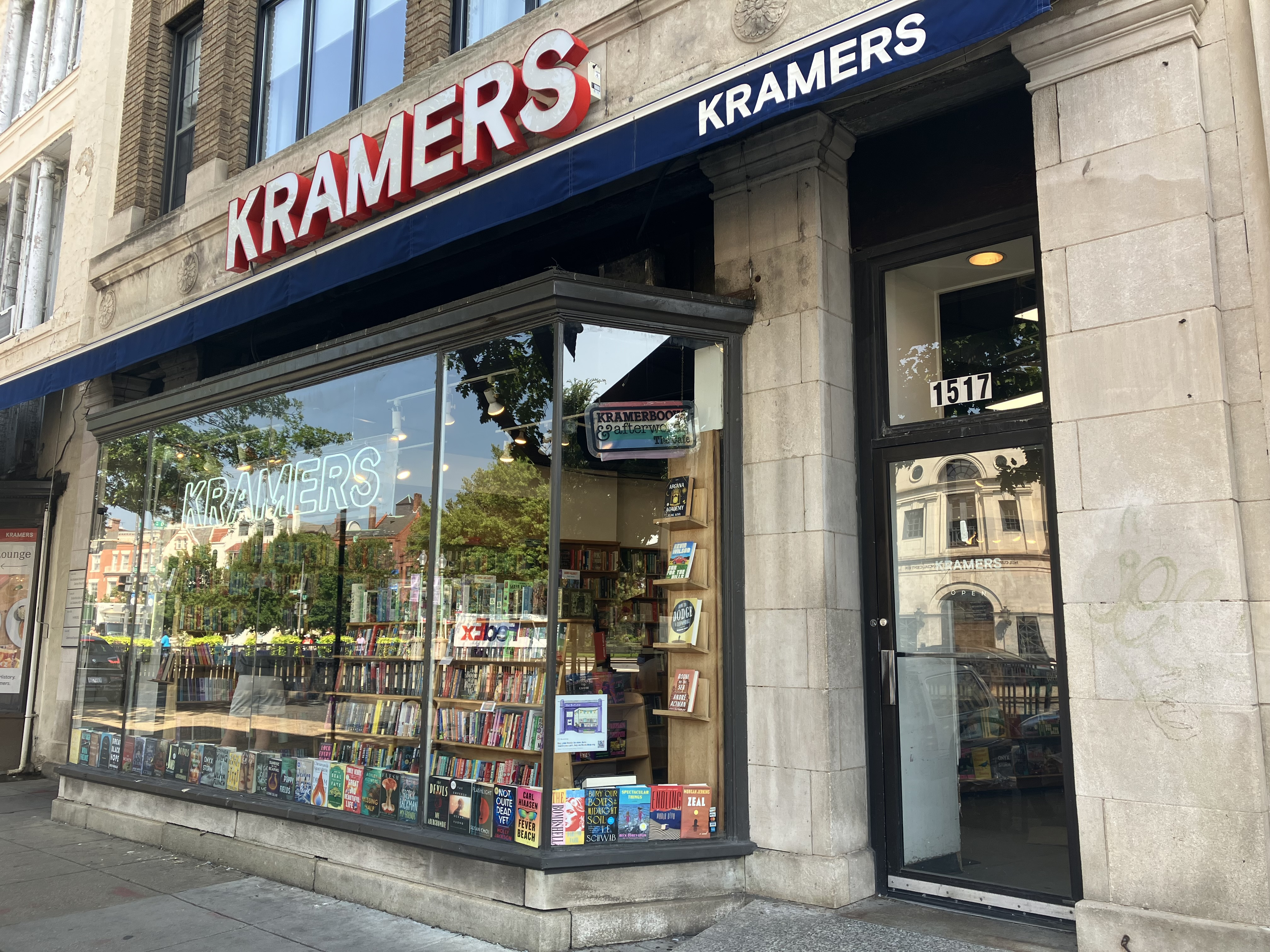
- Kramers, 2025
- Type: Private
- Industry: Bookstore, Restaurant
- Founded: 1976
- Founders: Bill Kramer, Henry Posner, David Tenney
- Headquarters: Washington, D.C., U.S.
- Key people: Steve Salis (owner)
- Website: kramers.com

Kramers (formerly known as Kramerbooks & Afterwords or Kramer's) is an independent bookstore and cafe in the Dupont Circle neighborhood of Washington, D.C. Since its founding in 1976 by Bill Kramer, Henry Posner, and David Tenney, Kramer's has become a local institution and meeting place for neighborhood residents, authors, and politicians. It was one of the first bookstores in the country to feature a cafe which influenced similar business models nationwide. Notable people that have visited Kramer's include Barack Obama, Andy Warhol, Maya Angelou, and Monica Lewinsky, whose purchases at the bookstore attracted national attention during the Lewinsky scandal investigation and led to a high-profile legal battle. Kramers was sold in 2016 to Steve Salis.

== History ==
=== Early history ===
Kramers, located at 1517 Connecticut Avenue NW in Washington, D.C.'s Dupont Circle neighborhood, opened in August 1976 by Bill Kramer, David Tenney, and Henry Posner. Two months later, the business partners opened Afterwords Cafe, with an entrance on 19th Street, in the same building. Constructed in 1920, the building was originally an automobile showroom. Later tenants included Hudson Air Conditioning Corporation and women's clothing stores Looby and Peck & Peck.

The bookstore was one of four in Washington, D.C., managed by Kramer, who had taken over the business from his parents, Sidney and Miriam Z. Kramer, librarians who opened their first store, Sidney Kramer Books, in 1946. Kramer wanted to open a business that provided customers a place to eat and read, what he described as "two of the three most enjoyable human activities." At the time of its opening, few places in the country provided such a service. The concept became popular, and other businesses, including the Harvard Book Store and Square Books, followed Kramerbooks & Afterwords' lead and opened their own cafes.

In its early history, Kramers was open 24 hours and soon became a popular destination for neighborhood residents, authors, and politicians. It also earned a reputation as a place to meet a potential date. The New York Times described Kramer's as "one part bookstore, one part restaurant and perhaps one part singles bar." According to Posner, Kramers in part "helped establish a street life in Dupont Circle." For many patrons, it was the first place where they had their "first real espresso and cappuccino, their first microbrews, their first taste of Häagen-Dazs, their first decent bagels." The owners would have fresh bagels from New York delivered to Washington, D.C.'s Greyhound station because they could not find any decent ones in the area.

In 1984, Afterwords Cafe expanded by offering sidewalk seating on 19th Street. The business expanded again in 1991 when the adjoining building occupied by Cafe Splendide, 1521 Connecticut Avenue, was purchased. The expanded section included an enlarged bar. In 1993, the first of two branches opened in Arlington, Virginia. The 10,000 sq ft (930 m^{2}) store was three times the size of the Connecticut Avenue location and also included a restaurant. Both of the Arlington branches were unsuccessful and soon closed.

=== Lewinsky scandal ===
Kramers came to national attention in 1998 during the Lewinsky scandal. It successfully fought a subpoena from Kenneth Starr to disclose which books Monica Lewinsky had purchased. When the subpoena was first issued, it was reported that Kramer's management would comply. However, Kramer said that was not the case. Librarians picketed the store, customers were upset, and sales dropped. Management chose to fight the subpoena with the help of several organizations, including the American Booksellers Association (ABA), American Library Association, and American Civil Liberties Union.

In an interview, Kramer defended his actions, citing the First Amendment and said, "They are looking for us to hand over information about a specific customer's specific purchases, and that we will not do." After U.S. District Judge Norma Holloway Johnson ordered Kramer's management to hand over the information to Starr, they declined and said they were ready to take the issue to the U.S. Supreme Court if necessary. Kramer's management and Lewinsky's lawyers reached an agreement whereby the list of books she purchased would be given to Starr by her lawyers and not the bookstore, thereby protecting the store's integrity. The store's six-figure legal bills were paid in part by the ABA.

=== Later history and sale ===
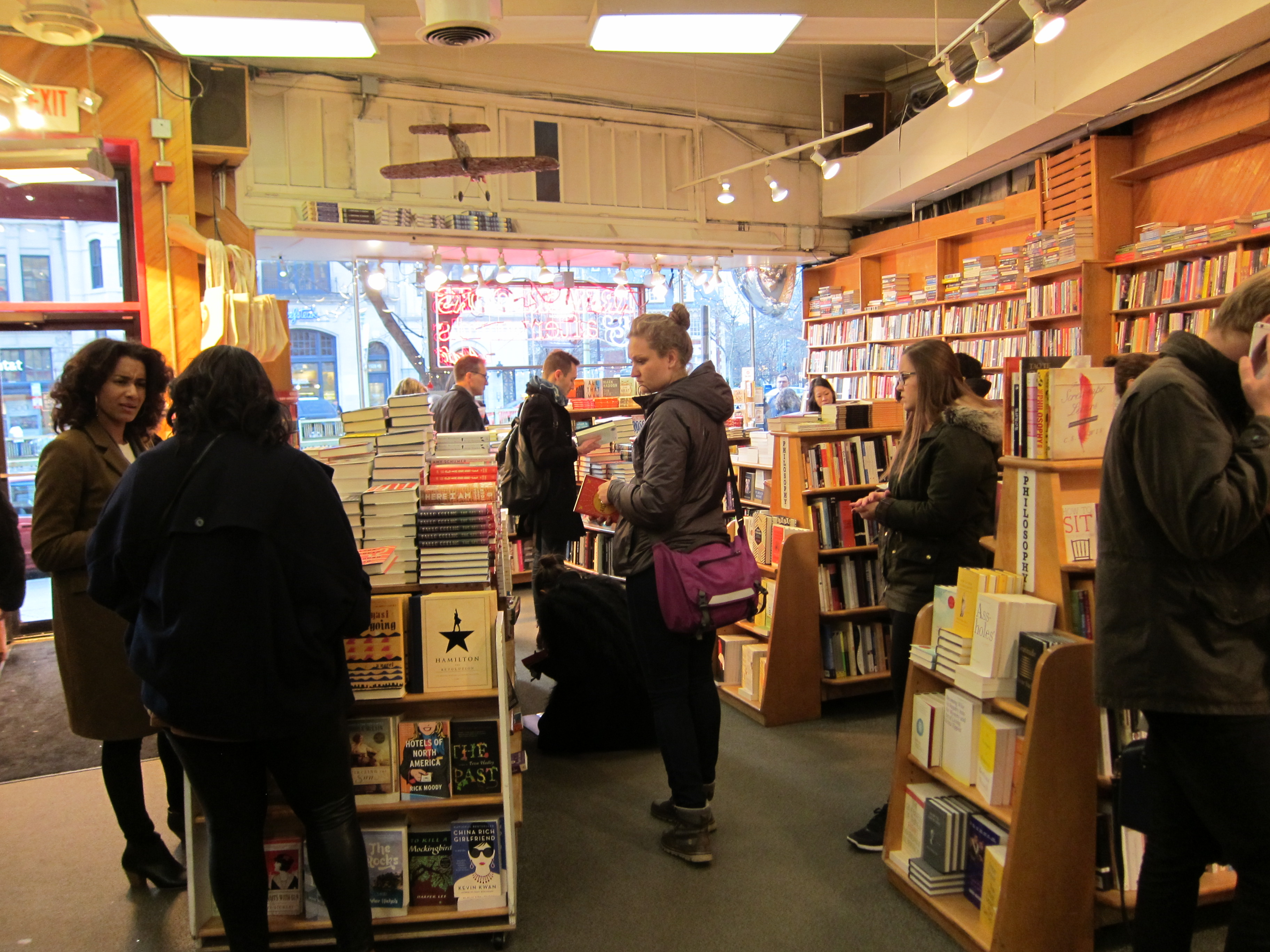
Kramers' interior

Despite the decline in the independent bookstore industry, Kramers has continued to draw in customers looking for an intimate setting, live music, author events, and full bar. Kramers is often called a Washington, D.C. institution and has been described as "iconic" and a "staple of the District's cultural scene." Notable people that have visited Kramers include President Barack Obama and his daughters who shopped at the store in 2011 on Small Business Saturday. Julia Louis-Dreyfus and John Slattery filmed a scene from the television series Veep in Kramers. Other celebrities that have visited include Maya Angelou, Andy Warhol, Toni Morrison, and Margaret Cho.

The shuttering of large chain bookstores, most notably the nearby Books-A-Million, proved to benefit Kramers. However, the increased number of trendy restaurants in the city affected the cafe's business. The cafe and bookstore bring in around the same amount of revenue, whereas before the cafe brought in more money. In 2015, the combined sales for the restaurant and cafe were $10 million. That same year Kramer and Tenney began plans to sell the business. Tenney said, "I knew the business was viable, but I also knew the restaurant was beat up and tired. If we could find some way to resurrect and invigorate the restaurant, there would be a wonderful future ahead." They were introduced to &pizza co-founder Steve Salis and in 2016, it was announced Salis would purchase Kramer's with Tenney remaining as part-owner. In 2017, Salis became sole owner of the store.

Salis oversaw an expansion and renovation of the business that included purchasing the adjoining building previously occupied by Willie T’s Lobster Shack. With the additional 800 sq ft (74 m^{2}) of retail space, the bookstore and cafe measure 4,500 sq ft (420 m^{2}). In 2017, several longtime employees, including the general manager, events manager, and head buyer, quit after disagreements with Salis and opened Solid State Books on H Street NE later that year.

In April 2020, Salis set up a pop-up take out and delivery of his BBQ sandwich franchise, the Federalist Pig, in the Afterwords Cafe. Salis announced in May 2020 that he intended to relocate Kramers to an undisclosed location. The local community responded with regret and grief. Salis later clarified he would keep the bookstore at its original location for at least three more years. In August 2020, he changed the name of Afterwords Cafe to All Day by Kramers, with a menu designed by Chef Vincent Griffith.
