= Bradley Beal =

American basketball player (born 1993)

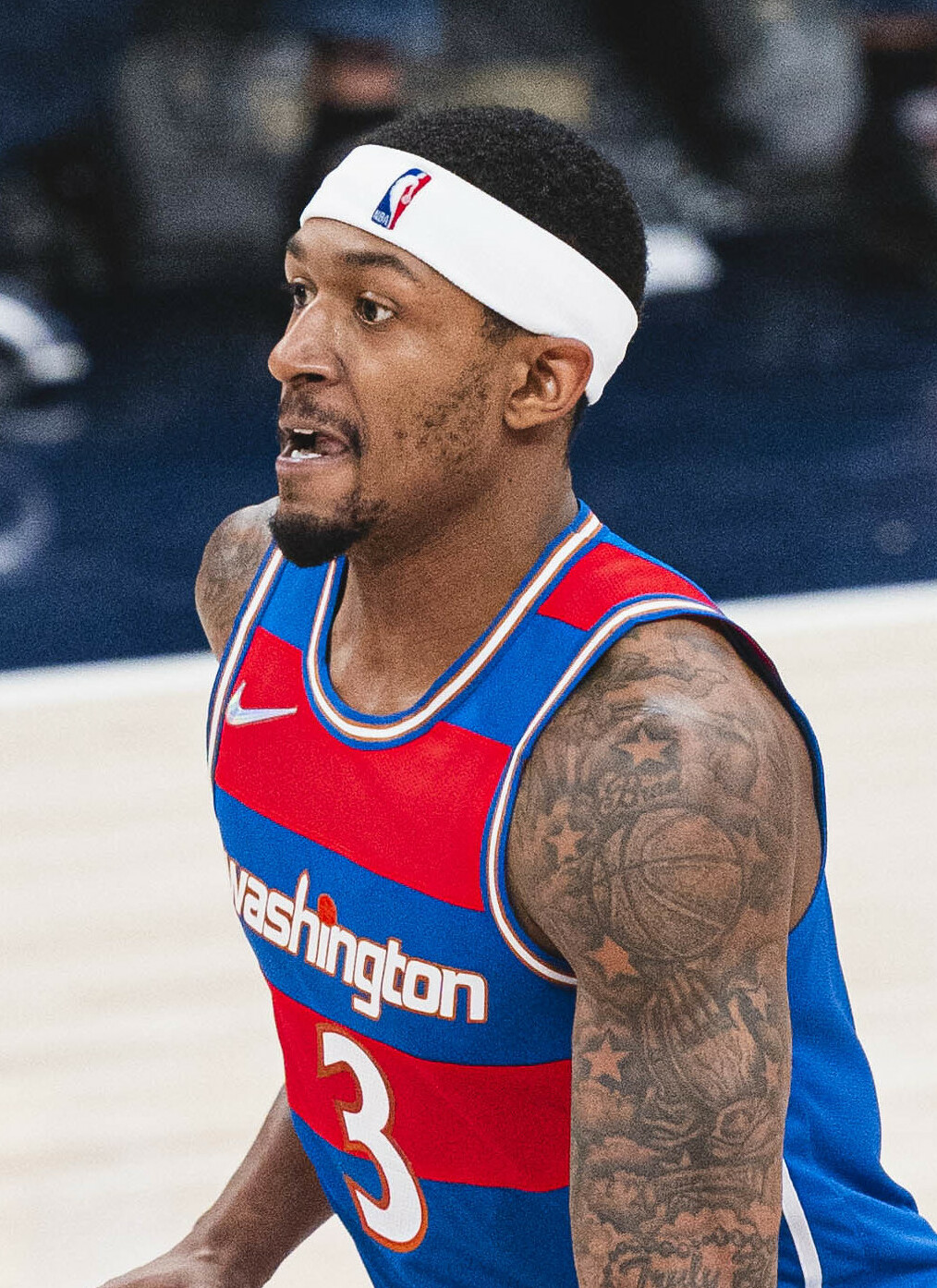
- Beal with the Washington Wizards in 2022

No. 3 – Los Angeles Clippers
- Position: Shooting guard
- League: NBA

Personal information
- Born: June 28, 1993 (age 33) St. Louis, Missouri, U.S.
- Listed height: 6 ft 4 in (1.93 m)
- Listed weight: 207 lb (94 kg)

Career information
- High school: Chaminade (Creve Coeur, Missouri)
- College: Florida (2011–2012)
- NBA draft: 2012: 1st round, 3rd overall pick
- Drafted by: Washington Wizards
- Playing career: 2012–present

Career history
- 2012–2023: Washington Wizards
- 2023–2025: Phoenix Suns
- 2025–present: Los Angeles Clippers

Career highlights
- 3× NBA All-Star (2018, 2019, 2021); All-NBA Third Team (2021); NBA All-Rookie First Team (2013); First-team All-SEC (2012); Gatorade National Player of the Year (2011); First-team Parade All-American (2011); McDonald's All-American (2011); Mr. Show-Me Basketball (2011); FIBA Under-17 World Cup MVP (2010); FIBA Under-16 Americas Championship MVP (2009)
- Stats at NBA.com
- Stats at Basketball Reference
Medals
Men's basketball
Representing United States
FIBA Under-17 World Championship
Gold medal – first place	2010 Hamburg	National team
FIBA Americas Under-16 Championship
Gold medal – first place	2009 Argentina	National team

Bradley Emmanuel Beal Sr. (born June 28, 1993) is an American professional basketball player for the Los Angeles Clippers of the National Basketball Association (NBA). Nicknamed "the Big Panda", he is a three-time NBA All-Star and one-time All-NBA Third Team selection.

Beal was selected by the Washington Wizards with the third overall pick in the 2012 NBA draft. In eleven seasons with Washington, he was named to the All-Rookie First Team in 2013, the All-NBA Third Team in 2021, and was a three-time All-Star. Beal is second on the Wizards' all-time leading scorer list. Beal was traded to the Phoenix Suns in 2023, forming a big 3 with Kevin Durant and Devin Booker; however, he struggled with constant injuries during his Suns tenure, a struggle that has continued to his time with the Clippers as he suffered a season-ending injury just six appearances into the 2025–26 season.

One of Beal's contracts - a five-year, $251 million supermax contract with a no-trade clause, initially signed with the Wizards - gained notoriety as being among the worst in NBA history.

== Early life ==
Beal attended Chaminade College Preparatory School in St. Louis, Missouri. He competed for the U.S. in the 2010 FIBA Under-17 World Championship, winning the championship while averaging 18 points per game.

In addition to winning the tournament, Beal made the All-Tournament Team and won the MVP award. During his senior year of high school, Beal averaged 32.5 points per game, 5.7 rebounds per game and 2.8 assists per game.

At the end of Beal's senior season, he was named the 2011 Mr. Show-Me Basketball which recognized him as the top high school basketball player in the state of Missouri. He was also named the 2011 Gatorade National Player of the Year.

College recruiting
Name	Hometown	School	Height	Weight	Commit date
Bradley Beal; SG	Creve Coeur, MO	Chaminade College Prep	6 ft 4 in (1.93 m)	210 lb (95 kg)	Nov 30, 2009
Bradley Beal; SG	Recruit ratings: Scout: Rivals: 247Sports: (98)				
Overall recruit ranking: Scout: 2 (SG); 7 (national); 29 (school) Rivals: 2 (SG); 4 (national)
Note: In many cases, Scout, Rivals, 247Sports, On3, and ESPN may conflict in their listings of height and weight.; In these cases, the average was taken. ESPN grades are on a 100-point scale.; Sources: "2011 Florida Basketball Commitment List". Rivals.; "2011 Florida College Basketball Team Recruiting Prospects". Scout.; "Florida Gators 2011 Player Commits". ESPN.; "Scout.com Team Recruiting Rankings". Scout.; "2011 Team Ranking". Rivals.

== College career ==
On November 30, 2009, Beal committed to the University of Florida. Beal accepted an athletic scholarship to attend the university, where he played for coach Billy Donovan's Gators team during the 2011–12 season.

In his first game at Florida, Beal started and recorded 14 points. Beal was named SEC Freshman of the Week on November 28, 2011. During the week of 11/21–11/28, Beal averaged 18.5 points, seven rebounds, two assists and 1.5 steals in two wins over Wright State and Jacksonville.

Beal would go on to win five additional SEC Freshman of the Week honors and be named to the SEC All-Freshman Team and was a first-team All-SEC selection. Beal finished the season averaging 14.8 points per game. He also helped his team advance to the Elite Eight during the NCAA tournament before being ousted by Louisville.

== Professional career ==
=== Washington Wizards (2012–2023) ===
==== All-Rookie honors (2012–2013) ====
On April 13, 2012, Beal declared for the NBA draft, foregoing his final three years of college eligibility. On June 28, 2012, his 19th birthday, Beal was drafted with the third overall pick in the 2012 NBA draft by the Washington Wizards.

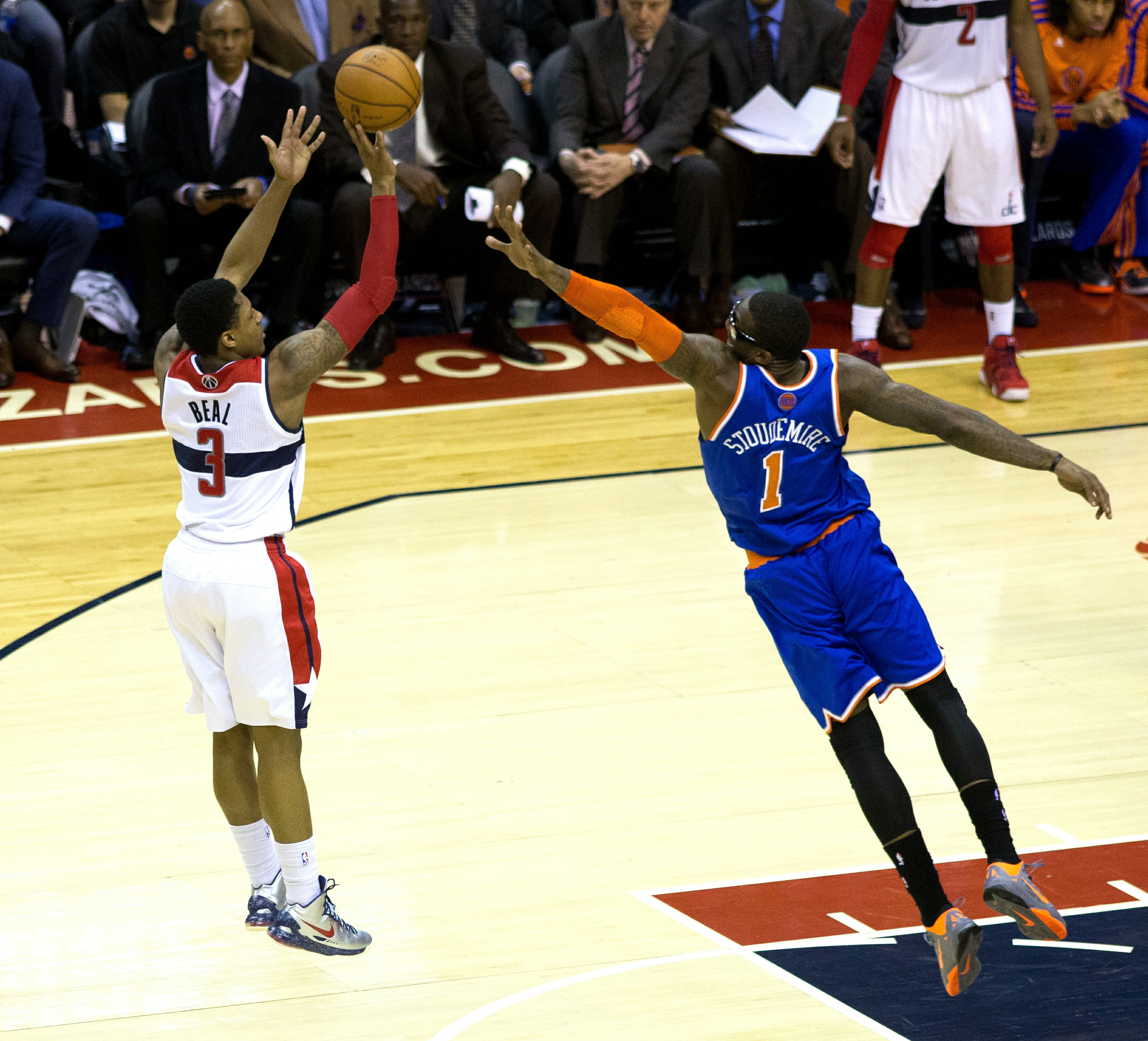
Beal in a game against the New York Knicks in 2013

Beal was named the Eastern Conference Rookie of the Month in December 2012 and January 2013. On January 4, 2013, in a game against the Brooklyn Nets, Beal scored a then career high 24 points and hit a clutch three-pointer to send the game to double overtime; the Wizards went on to lose the game. On January 17, Beal set a then career best with six three-pointers made in a loss to the Sacramento Kings. He went on to be selected to appear in the Rising Stars competition at the 2013 All-Star weekend.

On April 3, 2013, it was announced that Beal would miss the remainder of the 2012–13 season with a right leg injury. At the end of the season, after playing 56 games, he was named to the NBA All-Rookie first team, and finished third in voting for the NBA Rookie of the Year award.

==== First playoff appearance (2013–2014) ====
On November 10, 2013, Beal surpassed his then-career high by scoring 34 points in an overtime loss to the Oklahoma City Thunder. He later set a then-benchmark for his personal best by scoring a career-high 37 points in a loss to the Memphis Grizzlies. Beal finished as runner-up in the Three-Point Shootout at the 2014 NBA All-Star Weekend in New Orleans, losing to Marco Belinelli. At the time, Beal was the youngest competitor in the event's history. On April 29, 2014, Beal and the Wizards defeated the Bulls in the first round of the Eastern Conference Playoffs, moving the team on to the second round, a feat the franchise hadn't reached since 2005. In their series against the top-seeded Indiana Pacers, the Wizards lost in six games.

==== Injury-plagued seasons (2014–2016) ====
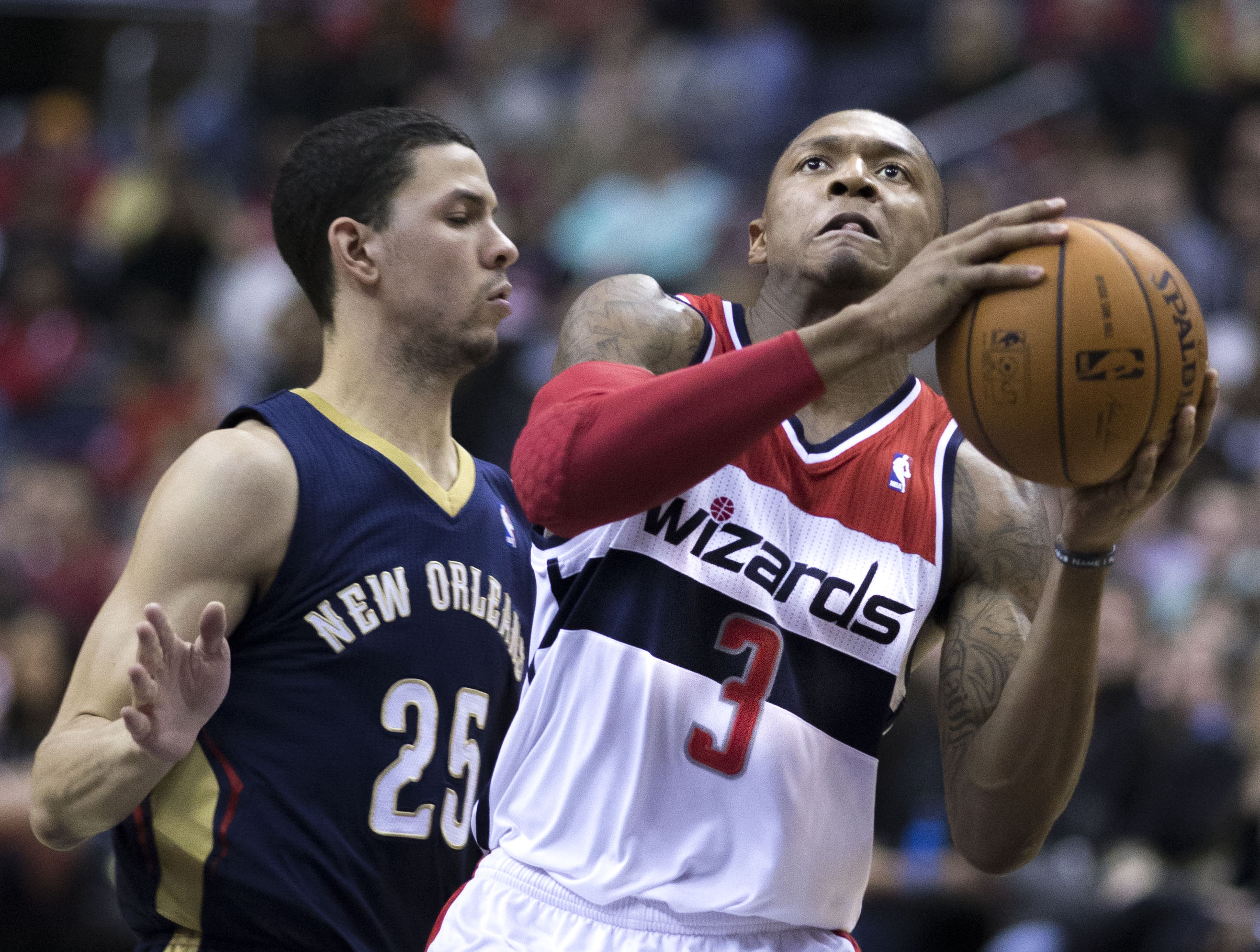
Beal in a game against the New Orleans Pelicans in 2014

On October 11, 2014, Beal underwent an MRI that revealed a non-displaced fracture of the scaphoid bone in his left wrist, subsequently requiring surgery. He was later ruled out for six to eight weeks. After missing the first nine games of the season with the injury, he made his season debut on November 19 against the Dallas Mavericks.

In just under 26 minutes off the bench, he recorded a team-high 21 points, as well as 3 rebounds, 3 assists and 1 steal, in the 102–105 loss. He went on to make a game-winning buzzer beater on December 10 against the Orlando Magic. With 0.8 seconds left on the clock, coach Randy Wittman drew up a guard around screen for Beal off the pass from Andre Miller that ended Orlando's attempts to send the game into overtime. He finished the game with 9 points, 3 rebounds, 3 assists and 1 block in the 91–89 win.

On February 5, Beal injured his right big toe and was later sidelined indefinitely after subsequent tests revealed a mild stress reaction in his right fibula. He missed eight games with the injury, as he returned to action on February 28 against Detroit, scoring eight points in 32 minutes as the Wizards snapped a six-game losing streak with a 99–95 win.

In Game 1 of the Wizards' semi-final matchup against the Atlanta Hawks on May 3, Beal scored a playoff career-high 28 points despite spraining his ankle early in the fourth quarter, helping his team defeat the Hawks 104–98. In Game 4 of the series on May 11, Beal scored a new playoff career high with 34 points in a loss to the Hawks which tied the series up at 2–2. The Wizards went on to lose the series to the Hawks in six games.

On November 4, 2015, Beal scored a game-high 25 points and made a three-pointer with 0.3 seconds remaining to lift the Wizards to a 102–99 win over the San Antonio Spurs. Beal had an injury-plagued season in 2015–16, as he missed three games in mid-November with a shoulder injury, and 16 games between December 11 and January 11 with a lower right leg injury. He had another stint on the sidelines in early March, missing three games with a sprained pelvis. He played in a career-low 55 games in 2015–16, and made a career-low 35 starts, but did record a career-high 17.4 points per game.

==== Breakthrough (2016–2017) ====
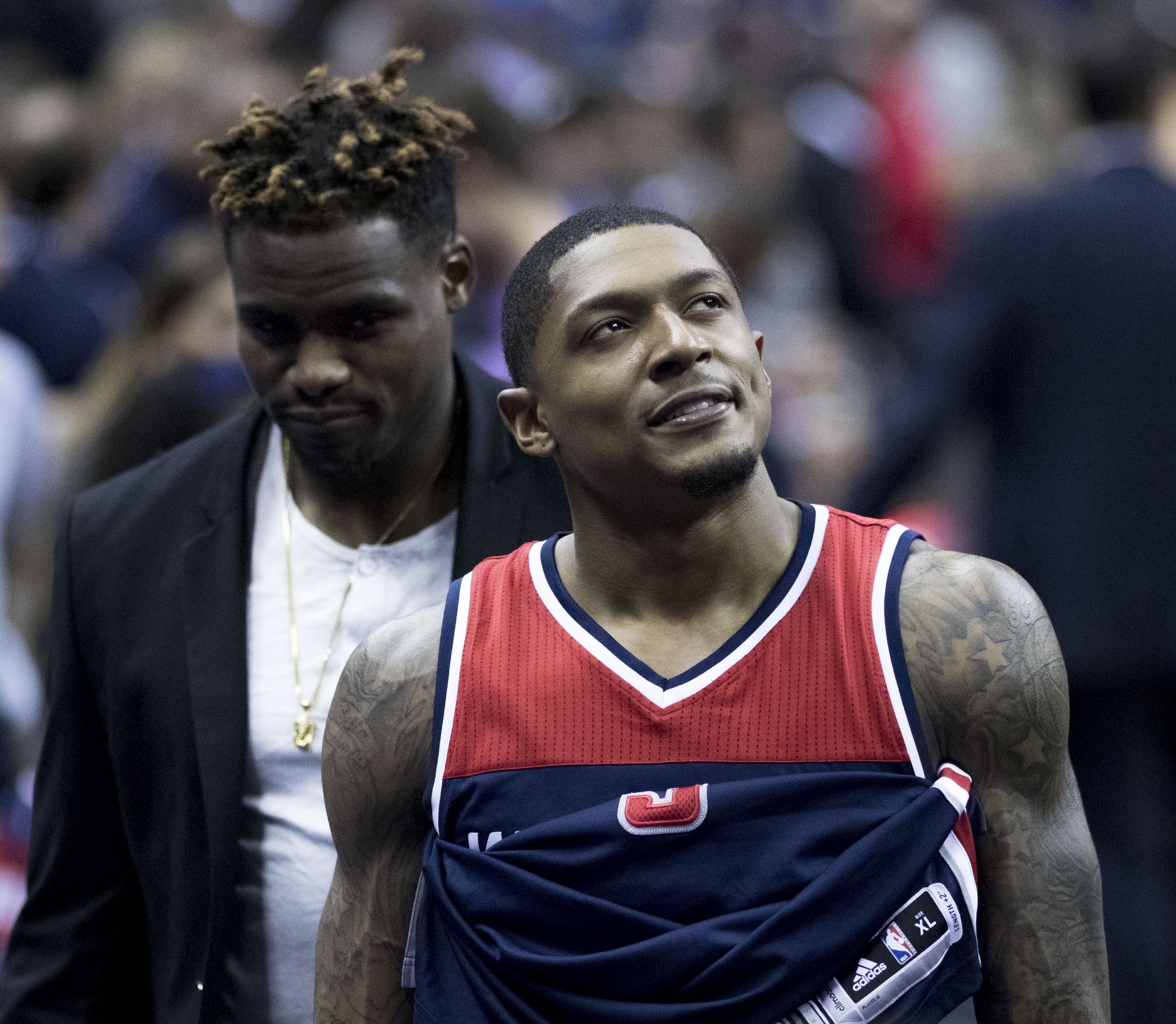
Beal in a game against the Cleveland Cavaliers in 2017

On July 26, 2016, Beal re-signed with the Wizards on a five-year, $128 million contract. On November 19, 2016, he scored 34 points in a 114–111 loss to the Miami Heat. Two days later, he had 30 or more in consecutive games for the first time in his five-year career, recording a then career-high 42 points in a 106–101 win over the Phoenix Suns. On November 27, he was fined $15,000 for grabbing at the throat of Evan Fournier during the Wizards' game against the Orlando Magic two days earlier. On November 28, he scored 31 points and hit a career-high seven three-pointers in a 101–95 overtime win over the Sacramento Kings.

On December 14, he recorded 20 points and a then career-high nine assists in a 109–106 win over the Charlotte Hornets. With two made three-pointers on December 16 against the Detroit Pistons, Beal reached 501 career three-pointers and became the third Wizards player to make 500, joining Gilbert Arenas and Antawn Jamison. On December 18, he had a 41-point effort in a 117–110 win over the Los Angeles Clippers. On February 6, 2017, he had another 41-point effort in a 140–135 overtime loss to the Cleveland Cavaliers.

On February 24, 2017, he scored 40 points in a 120–112 loss to the Philadelphia 76ers, recording his fourth 40-point game of the season. On March 29, 2017, he scored 27 points in a 133–124 loss to the Los Angeles Clippers. During the game, Beal surpassed Gilbert Arenas for the franchise single-season three-point record. He made five against the Clippers to finish with 209 by the end of the game—Arenas had 205 in 2004–05 and 2006–07. Beal joined Kevin Durant and Vince Carter as the only three players in NBA history, 23 years old or younger, to average at least 23 points and shoot above 40 percent from three-point range.

On May 12, 2017, Beal helped the Wizards avoid elimination and force a Game 7 in their second-round playoff series against the Boston Celtics with a game-high 33 points in a 92–91 Game 6 win. In Game 7 three days later, Beal led the Wizards—a team playing in its first Game 7 since 1979—with 38 points, including 24 in the second half, but he couldn't lead them to victory as they fell 115–105 to bow out of the playoffs with a 4–3 defeat.

==== First All-Star selection (2017–2018) ====
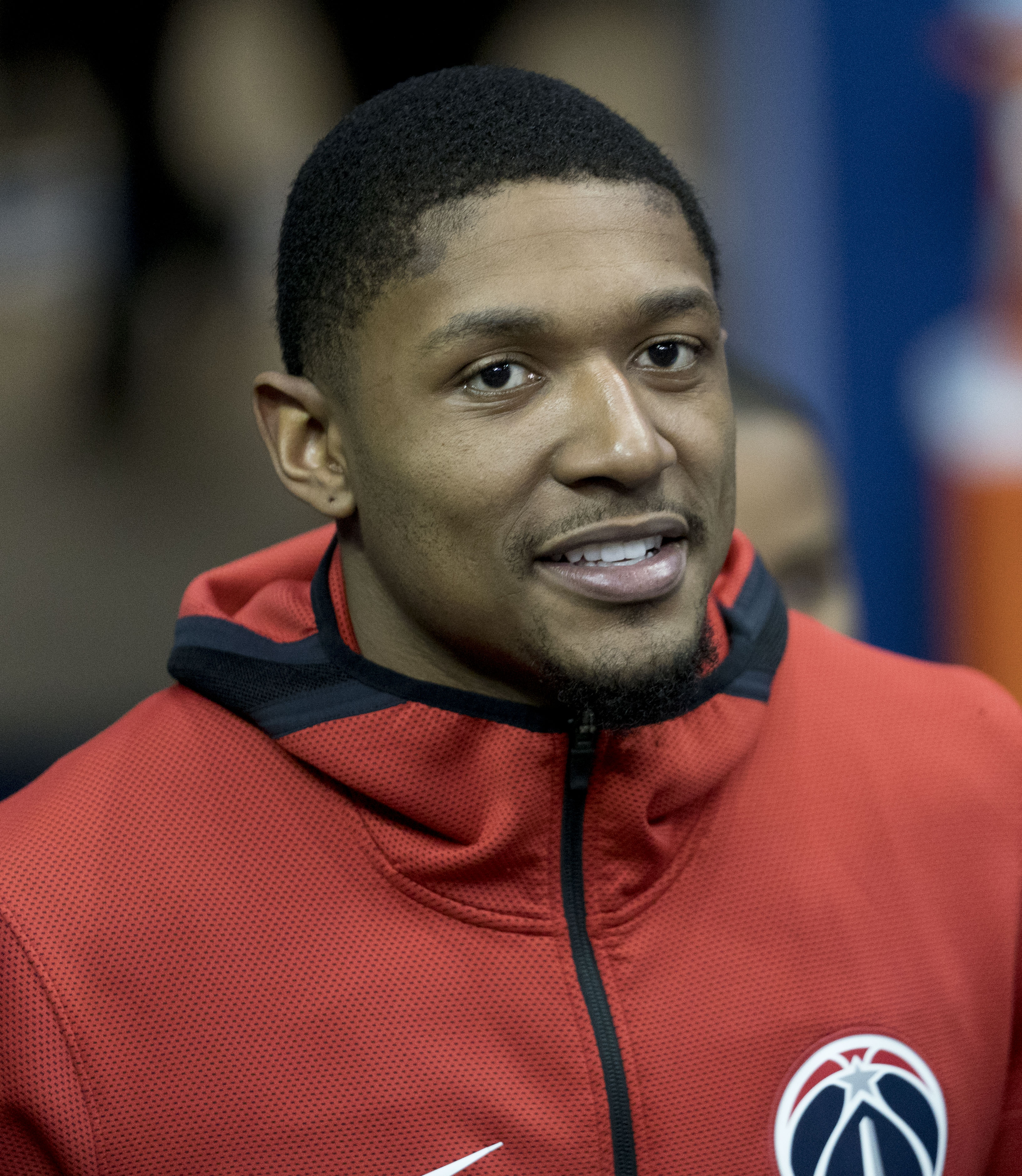
Beal in 2018

On November 1, 2017, Beal scored a then season-high 40 points in a 122–116 loss to the Phoenix Suns. On November 20, 2017, in a 99–88 win over the Milwaukee Bucks, Beal scored 23 points and became the youngest player in NBA history to reach 700 made three-pointers. On December 5, 2017, he scored a then career-high 51 points in a 106–92 win over the Portland Trail Blazers. He hit five three-pointers and made a career-high 21 field goals.

On December 31, 2017, Beal scored 17 of his 39 points in the fourth quarter to lead Washington to a 114–110 win over the Chicago Bulls. He scored 15 straight points in the fourth as the Wizards rallied from an eight-point deficit early in the period. He also had nine rebounds and tied a then career high with nine assists. Beal was subsequently named Eastern Conference Player of the Week for games played Monday, December 25 through Sunday, December 31.

On January 23, 2018, Beal was named an NBA All-Star for the first time. Two days later, he had a 41-point effort in a 121–112 loss to the Oklahoma City Thunder. On March 4, 2018, he recorded 22 points and a then-career-high 11 assists in a 98–95 loss to the Indiana Pacers. On March 14, 2018, he scored 34 points in a 125–124 double-overtime win over the Boston Celtics. In 2017–18, Beal recorded the 21st 1,800-point season in team history. In Game 3 of the Wizards' first-round playoff series against the Toronto Raptors, Beal scored 21 of his 28 points in the first half, as the Wizards cut the series deficit to 2–1 with a 122–103 win. In Game 4, Beal scored 31 points in a 106–98 win, helping the Wizards tie the series at 2–2. The Wizards went on to lose the series in six games despite Beal's 32 points in a 102–92 loss in Game 6.

==== Missing playoffs (2018–2020) ====
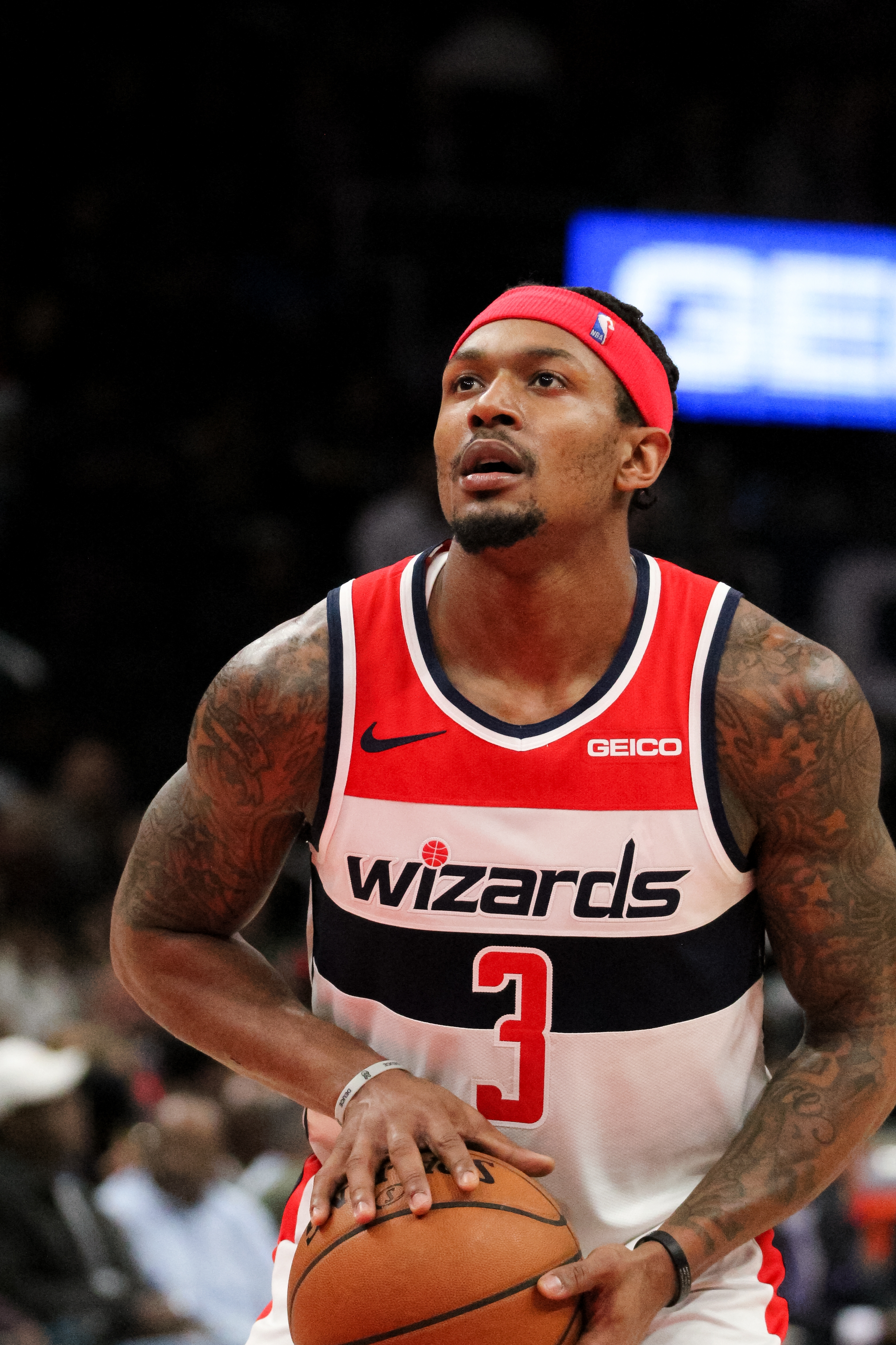
Beal in 2019

On October 20, 2018, Beal scored 32 points, going 6 for 11 on three-pointers, in a 117–113 loss to the Toronto Raptors. He broke Washington's franchise record for most three-pointers in a career, surpassing Gilbert Arenas (868) by making his 869th during the fourth quarter. On November 14, he scored 20 points and hit three three-pointers in a 119–95 win over the Cleveland Cavaliers. Beal hit his 900th career three-pointer in the first quarter, becoming the youngest player in NBA history to reach 900. On November 26, he equaled his season high with 32 points in a 135–131 overtime win over the Houston Rockets. On December 5, he set a new season high with 36 points in a 131–117 win over the Atlanta Hawks. He was subsequently named Eastern Conference Player of the Week for games played Monday, December 3, through Sunday, December 9. On December 22, he recorded his first career triple-double with 40 points, a career-high 15 assists and 11 rebounds in a 149–146 triple-overtime win over the Phoenix Suns.

On January 13, he had his second triple-double of the season, collecting season highs of 43 points and 15 assists along with 10 rebounds in a 140–138 double-overtime loss to the Raptors. He joined Oscar Robertson as the only players in NBA history with multiple games of 40 points, 15 assists and 10 rebounds in a season—Robertson had three such games in 1961–62. On February 22, he scored a season-high 46 points in a 123–110 loss to the Charlotte Hornets.

Beal finished February averaging a career-high 30.9 points while shooting 52.2 percent from the field. On March 15, he scored 40 points in a 116–110 loss to the Hornets. He had 40 points for the second straight game a day later and made a career-high nine three-pointers in a 135–128 win over the Memphis Grizzlies. He was subsequently named Eastern Conference Player of the Week for games played Monday, March 11, through Sunday, March 17. In April 2019, he became the first player in franchise history with 2,000 points, 400 rebounds and 400 assists in a season. He also became the first player in Wizards franchise history to average at least 25 points, five rebounds and five assists, while appearing in all 82 games for the second consecutive season.

On October 17, 2019, Beal signed a two-year contract extension worth a maximum of $72 million to remain with the Wizards. On October 30, 2019, Beal recorded 46 points and 8 assists in a 159–158 loss to the Houston Rockets. In November, Beal scored 44 points in consecutive games, in a loss to the Boston Celtics and a win over the Minnesota Timberwolves, respectively.

On February 23, 2020, Beal scored a then career-high 53 points in a 126–117 loss to the Chicago Bulls. During the game, Beal also passed Jeff Malone for second on the Wizards' all time scoring list. The following day, Beal again surpassed his career high, this time with a 55-point performance in a 140–137 overtime loss to the Milwaukee Bucks. Beal became the first player to score 50 points on consecutive nights since Kobe Bryant in 2007. On February 28, Beal scored 42 points alongside 10 assists in a 119–129 loss to the Utah Jazz. In total, Beal averaged an impressive 36.2 points per game in the month of February, which led the league. This included a streak in which Beal scored at least 26 points in 21 consecutive games, a streak that ended on March 8 when Beal scored 23 points in a 100–89 loss to the Miami Heat. Two days later, Beal recorded 39 points and 7 assists in a 122–115 win against the New York Knicks, his final game before the abrupt suspension of the 2019–20 NBA season. At the time of the suspension, Beal had appeared in 57 games, averaging 30.5 points and 6.1 assists. His 30.5 points per game were second only to James Harden.

On July 7, 2020, the Wizards announced that Beal would not participate in the 2019–20 NBA restart in Walt Disney World at Orlando due to a shoulder injury.

==== First All-NBA selection and surgery (2020–2022) ====
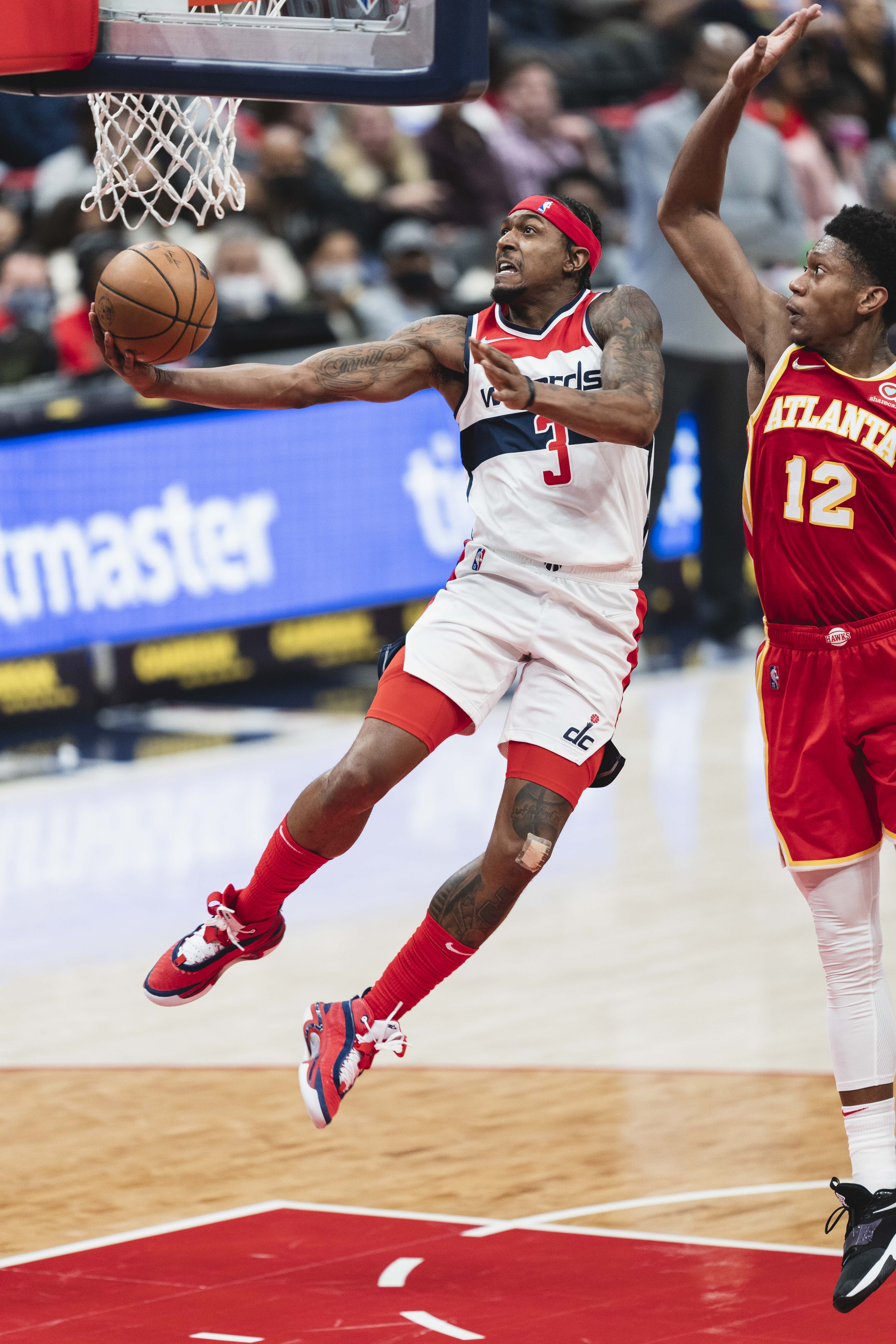
Beal attempts a layup in 2021

On January 6, 2021, Beal put up a career high of 60 points in a 141–136 loss to the Philadelphia 76ers, tying Gilbert Arenas' Wizards franchise record for points scored in a game by an individual. On February 3, Beal scored 32 points in a 103–100 win over the Miami Heat; he scored at least 25 points in 17 straight games to open the 2020–21 season, which is the most to start a season since the 1976–77 season. On February 18, Beal was selected to play in his third All-Star Game as a starter. Beal was selected by to play on Kevin Durant's team as a starter for the All-Star Game, joining his childhood friend Jayson Tatum.

After starting the season 17–32, Beal helped lead the Wizards on a 17–6 run to end the season, and secured the 8th seed in the Eastern Conference. Alongside Russell Westbrook, Beal led the Wizards to a blowout win 142–115 over the Indiana Pacers in the play-in tournament to clinch the last playoff spot, marking the Wizards' first playoff appearance since 2018. Beal also earned his first All-NBA selection, being named to the All-NBA Third team.

In the 2020-21 season Beal scored a career-high 31.3 points per game. He finished second only to Steph Curry, who averaged 32.0. The 31.3 points per game for a season stands as the franchise record.

On February 8, 2022, Beal planned to undergo season-ending surgery on his left wrist. Beal played 40 games on the season but also shot a career-low 30% from three-point range. He averaged a career-high 6.6 assists per game.

==== Contract extension and trade request (2022–2023) ====
Beal declined his $36.4 million option to become a free agent on June 30, 2022. He later signed new 5-year, $251 million max contract on July 6. On October 21, Beal scored 19 points, including a game-winning bank shot, in a 102–100 win over the Chicago Bulls. On February 28, 2023, Beal scored a season-high 37 points in a 119–116 win over the Atlanta Hawks.

Heading to the 2023 offseason, Beal and the Wizards began discussing possibly trading him to another team.

=== Phoenix Suns (2023–2025) ===
==== First season in Phoenix (2023–2024) ====
On June 24, 2023, the Wizards traded Beal, along with Jordan Goodwin and Isaiah Todd, to the Phoenix Suns in exchange for a package that included four first-round pick swaps, six second-round picks, Landry Shamet, and future teammate Chris Paul. After missing the first seven games of the season due to lower back tightness, Beal made his debut with the Suns on November 8, 2023 against the Chicago Bulls with 13 points, 4 rebounds, and 4 assists in 23 minutes of action during a tense 116–115 overtime win. On January 11, 2024, Beal scored 37 points and made 8-of-10 three-pointers in a 127–109 win against the Los Angeles Lakers. Beal made his return to Washington on February 4. In his first game against his former team, Beal shot 16-of-21 from the field and finished with a season-high 43 points in a 140–112 victory over the Wizards. On April 14, 2024, Beal scored a game-high 36 points and grabbed a team-high 6 rebounds in a 125–106 win over the Minnesota Timberwolves, helping the Suns not only avoid the NBA play-in tournament, but also secure a spot in the playoffs for their fourth straight year in their regular-season finale. They went on to get swept in the first round by the Timberwolves, with Beal finishing with nine points, six turnovers, and fouling out in game 4.

==== Constant injuries and bench role (2024–2025) ====
With the Suns sitting at 15–18 to begin the 2024–25 campaign, the Suns elected to move Beal to the bench in favor of Ryan Dunn, beginning with their January 6, 2025 game against the Philadelphia 76ers. In his first game off the bench in nine years, Beal scored 20 of his 25 points in the second half as Phoenix snapped a four-game losing streak with a 109–99 victory. On July 16, 2025, Beal was waived by the Suns after a contract buyout agreement.

=== Los Angeles Clippers (2025–present) ===
On July 18, 2025, Beal signed a two-year $11 million contract with the Los Angeles Clippers including a player option for the 2026–27 season. On November 12, Beal underwent a season-ending surgery to repair a hip fracture. In six games that season, he averaged career lows in minutes, points, rebounds, assists, steals, blocks, field goal percentage, and free throw percentage.

== National team career ==
Beal committed to playing on the 2020 U.S. Olympic team, delayed until 2021 because of the COVID-19 pandemic. After playing in three exhibition games, he was ruled out for the Tokyo Olympics after testing positive for the coronavirus. Beal later expressed interest in joining the 2024 U.S. Olympic team if he was asked to join.

== Career statistics ==
Legend
GP	Games played	GS	Games started	MPG	Minutes per game
FG%	Field goal percentage	3P%	3-point field goal percentage	FT%	Free throw percentage
RPG	Rebounds per game	APG	Assists per game	SPG	Steals per game
BPG	Blocks per game	PPG	Points per game	**Bold**	Career high
*	Led the league

=== NBA ===
==== Regular season ====
Year	Team	GP	GS	MPG	FG%	3P%	FT%	RPG	APG	SPG	BPG	PPG
2012–13	Washington	56	46	31.2	.410	.386	.786	3.8	2.4	.9	.5	13.9
2013–14	Washington	73	73	34.7	.419	.402	.788	3.7	3.3	1.0	.2	17.1
2014–15	Washington	63	59	33.5	.427	.409	.783	3.8	3.1	1.2	.3	15.3
2015–16	Washington	55	35	31.1	.449	.387	.767	3.4	2.9	1.0	.2	17.4
2016–17	Washington	77	77	34.9	.482	.404	.825	3.1	3.5	1.1	.3	23.1
2017–18	Washington	**82***	**82***	36.3	.460	.375	.793	4.4	4.5	1.2	.4	22.6
2018–19	Washington	**82***	**82***	**36.9***	.475	.351	.808	**5.0**	5.5	**1.5**	**.7**	25.6
2019–20	Washington	57	57	36.0	.455	.353	.842	4.2	6.1	1.2	.4	30.5
2020–21	Washington	60	60	35.8	.485	.349	**.889**	4.7	4.4	1.2	.4	**31.3**
2021–22	Washington	40	40	36.0	.451	.300	.833	4.7	**6.6**	.9	.4	23.2
2022–23	Washington	50	50	33.5	.506	.365	.842	3.9	5.4	.9	**.7**	23.2
2023–24	Phoenix	53	53	33.3	**.513**	**.430**	.813	4.4	5.0	1.0	.5	18.2
2024–25	Phoenix	53	38	32.1	.497	.386	.803	3.3	3.7	1.1	.5	17.0
2025–26	L.A. Clippers	6	6	20.2	.375	.368	.750	.8	1.7	.5	.0	8.2
Career		807	758	34.3	.464	.376	.821	4.0	4.3	1.1	.4	21.4
All-Star		3	1	21.7	.514	.433	—	1.0	2.3	1.0	.0	17.0

==== Playoffs ====
Year	Team	GP	GS	MPG	FG%	3P%	FT%	RPG	APG	SPG	BPG	PPG
2014	Washington	11	11	41.6	.424	.415	.796	5.0	4.5	**1.6**	.6	19.2
2015	Washington	10	10	**41.8**	.405	.365	.831	5.5	**4.6**	**1.6**	**.7**	23.4
2017	Washington	**13**	**13**	38.9	**.471**	.287	.820	3.3	2.7	**1.6**	.6	24.8
2018	Washington	6	6	35.9	.454	**.467**	**.870**	3.3	2.8	1.2	.3	23.2
2021	Washington	5	5	39.1	.455	.219	.861	**6.2**	4.2	.8	.6	**30.0**
2024	Phoenix	4	4	38.5	.441	.435	.800	2.8	4.5	.8	.3	16.5
Career		49	49	39.7	.442	.353	.828	4.4	3.8	1.4	.6	22.9

=== College ===
Year	Team	GP	GS	MPG	FG%	3P%	FT%	RPG	APG	SPG	BPG	PPG
2011–12	Florida	37	37	34.2	.445	.339	.769	6.7	2.2	1.4	.8	14.8

== Personal life ==
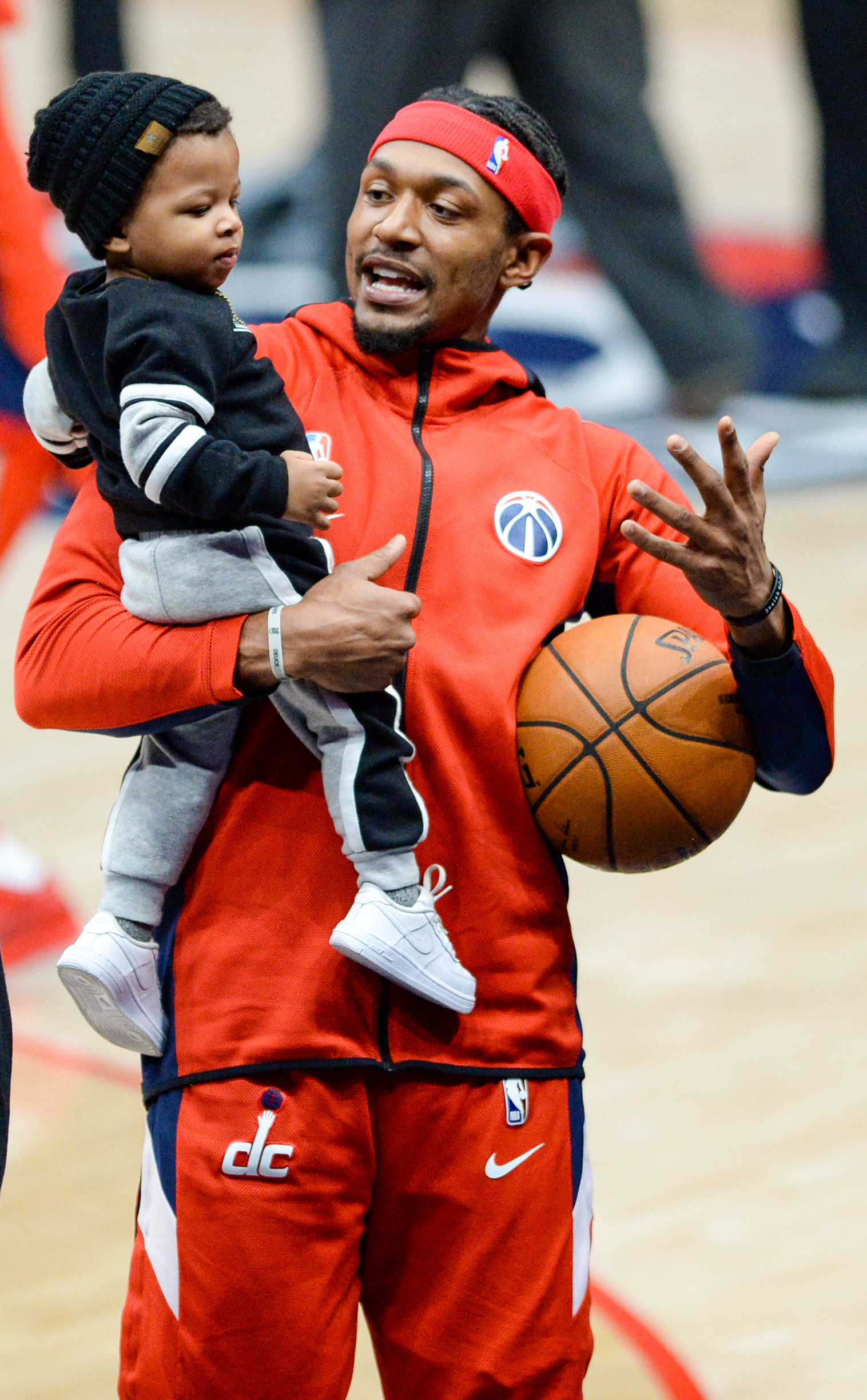
Beal holding his son Deuce in 2019

Beal and his wife Kamiah Adams have three sons together. Their eldest son, Bradley "Deuce" Beal II, was born in 2018, followed by Braylen Beal in 2019, and Braxton Beal in 2022. The couple got engaged in 2020, and married in 2025.

Beal is the son of Bobby and Besta Beal, and has four brothers: Brandon, Bruce, Byron and Bryon. All four played or are currently playing college football: Brandon played tight end at Northern Illinois; Bruce played offensive lineman at Alabama State; and Bryon and Byron played offensive linemen and defensive line, respectively, at Lindenwood University.

Beal forged a partnership with the St. Louis Eagles AAU basketball club, which he played for in his high school days, after joining the NBA; in 2017 the organization was officially renamed Bradley Beal Elite. The club fields boys' and girls' teams in the Nike-sponsored Elite Youth Basketball League. In 2024, Beal acquired naming rights to a sports facility in Chesterfield, Missouri; the Beal Center hosts Bradley Beal Elite team events as well as volleyball clubs, community youth sports, and other programming.

Rapper Nelly, who is a family friend, used to walk Beal to school. Beal, in turn, babysat future Boston Celtics forward Jayson Tatum as a teen, becoming a close friend and mentor to the fellow St. Louis native.

Beal considers himself a nerd, with a 4.0 GPA in high school and studying biology as a pre-med in college.

In August 2020, Beal sold his 12,000 square-foot French Provencal-style McLean, Virginia mansion for $3.5 million to co-founder of &pizza, entrepreneur Steve Salis.

== See also ==
- List of NBA career 3-point scoring leaders
