= Jeff Motuzas =

American baseball player and coach

- Born: October 1, 1971 (age 54); Bridgeport, Connecticut, U.S.
- Bats: Right Throws: Right
- Stats at Baseball Reference

Jeffrey R. Motuzas (born October 1, 1971) is an American former baseball bullpen catcher for the Arizona Diamondbacks.

Motuzas was born in Nashua, New Hampshire and attended Nashua High School. He was drafted by the New York Yankees in the 13th round (343rd overall) of the 1990 Major League Baseball draft. Motuzas played for the Yankees minor league system until he retired from playing in 1996.

Motuzas served as the bullpen catcher for the Diamondbacks from 1998–2013. Also of note has been Motuzas participating in the Home Run Derby as a Derby pitcher, a role that is almost always filled by players other than actual pitchers.
