= Honeymoon Chicken =

Restaurant in Washington, D.C., U.S.

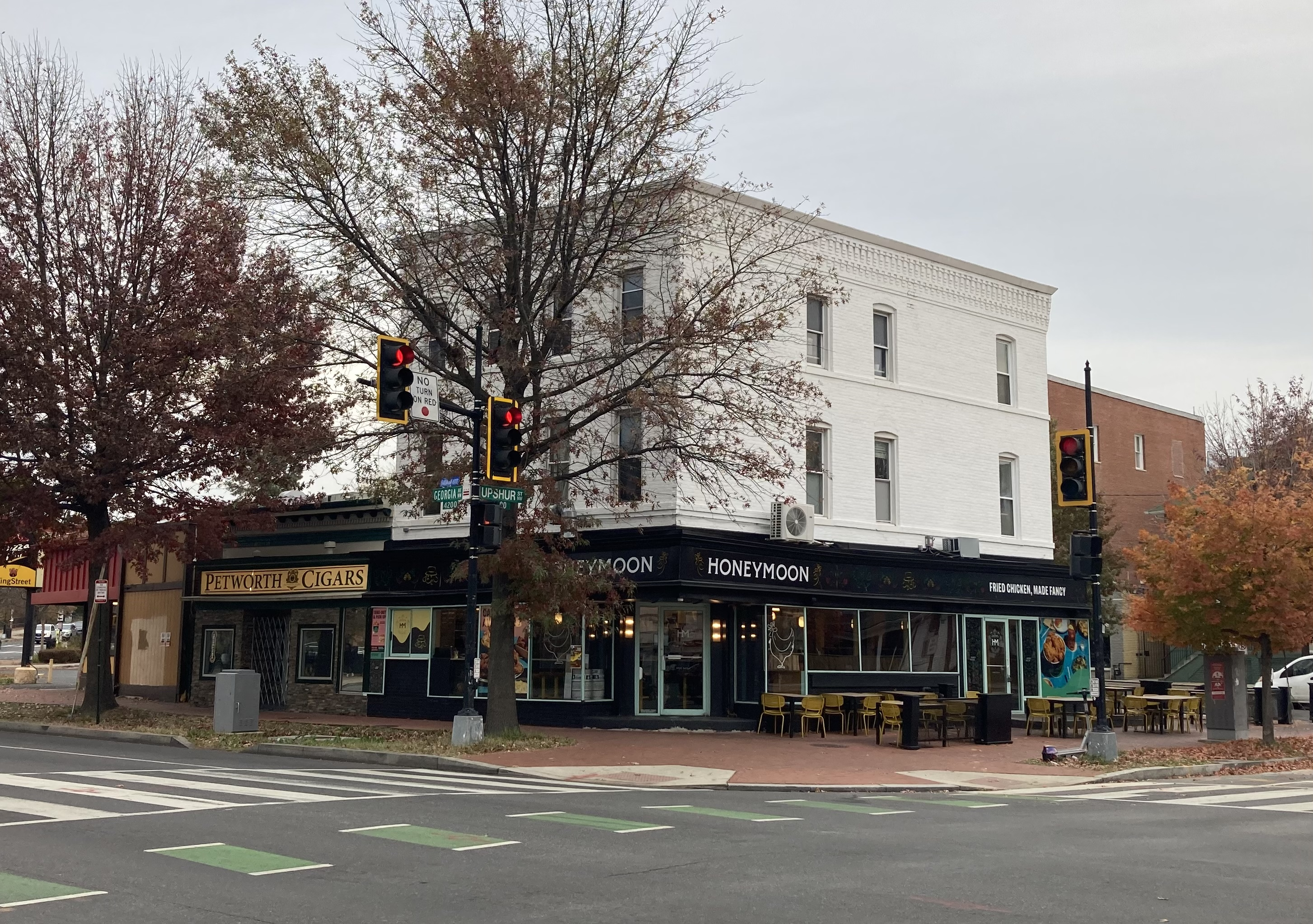
- The restaurant's exterior, 2023
- Interactive map of Honeymoon Chicken

Restaurant information
- Established: January 12, 2022
- Owner: Steve Salis
- Chef: Rob Sonderman
- Location: 4201 Georgia Avenue NW, Washington, D.C., 20011, United States
- Coordinates: 38°56′31.4″N 77°1′31.1″W
- Website: honeymoonchicken.com

Honeymoon Chicken is a restaurant in Petworth, Washington, D.C., United States. Steve Salis is the founder and Rob Sonderman is the chef.

== Description ==
The American menu specializes in fried chicken. The menu has also featured sandwiches, including honey garlic chicken bánh mì and crispy mushroom varieties, as well as salads and biscuits. Other sides include chicken poutine, hot honey cauliflower, honey-butter rolls, and macaroni and cheese.

== History ==
The restaurant opened on January 12, 2022.

== Reception ==
Ann Limpert included the honey-butter rolls in Washingtonian magazine's 2022 list of "our food critic's 9 favorite cold-weather comfort foods". Honeymoon Chicken also ranked third in the best new restaurant category of the magazine's annual readers' survey. The Washington Post's Tim Carman gave Honeymoon Chicken honorable mention in a list of Washington metropolitan area's ten best casual restaurants of 2022. Chelsea Brasted included the business in Southern Living's list of the South's best new restaurants of 2023.

== See also ==
- List of Michelin Bib Gourmand restaurants in the United States
