= Nashua High School North =

Public high school in Nashua, New Hampshire

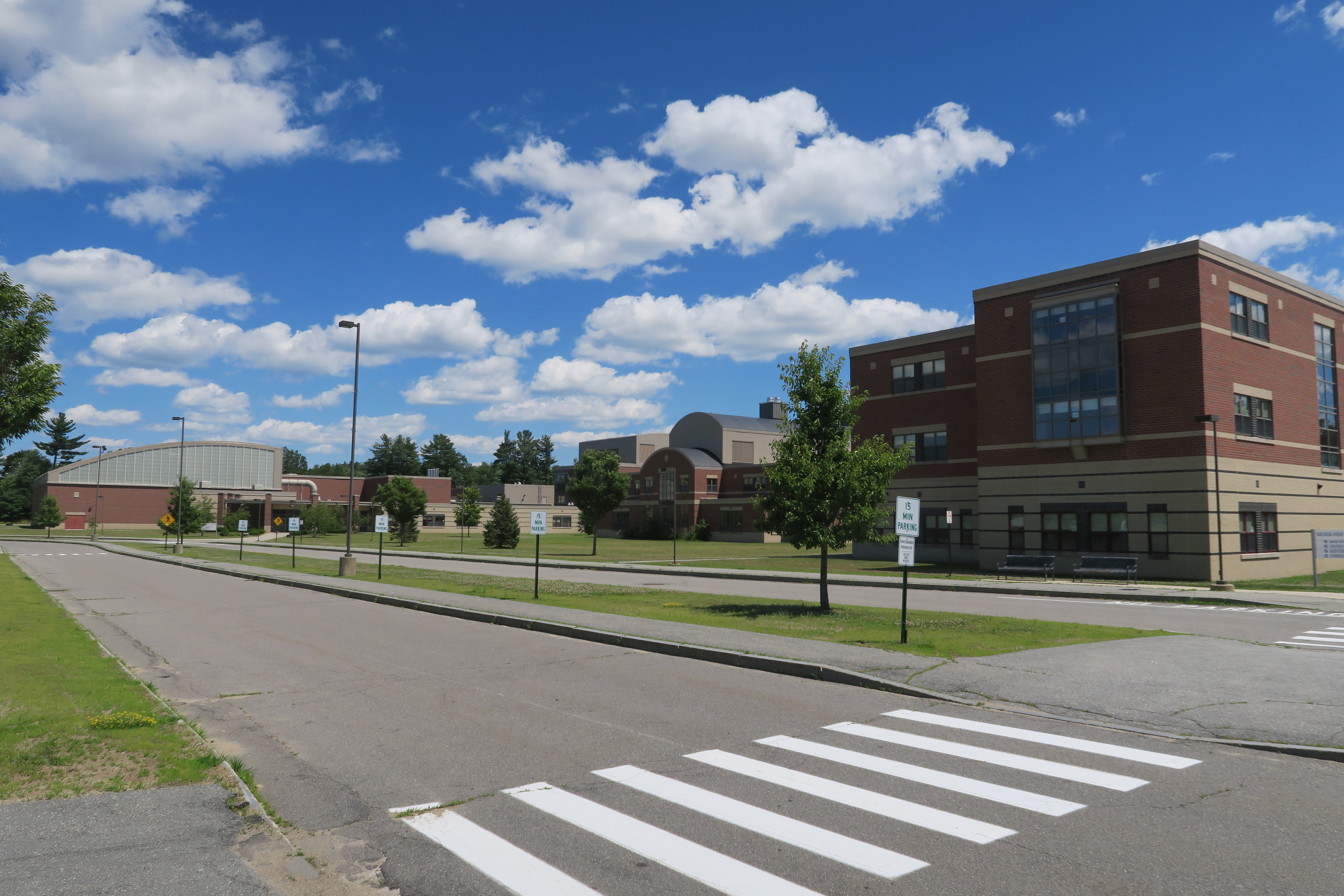

Location
- 8 Titan Way; Nashua, New Hampshire 03063; United States; 42°45′01″N 71°30′45″W

Information
- Type: Public high school
- Established: 2004; 22 years ago
- School district: Nashua School District
- Superintendent: Mario Andrade
- Principal: Nathan Burns
- Teaching staff: 119.00 (FTE)
- Grades: 9–12
- Gender: Coeducational
- Enrollment: 1,543 (2024–2025)
- Student to teacher ratio: 12.97
- Campus: Suburban
- Colors: Navy; Carolina blue; white
- Team name: Titans
- Website: nashua.edu/north

Nashua High School North is a public high school located in Nashua, New Hampshire. The school's current location was erected in 2002 with its first class graduating in June 2005, one year after the city's high schools officially split into two locations and establishments (with the earlier high school now being renamed Nashua High School South). Generally, students living north of the Nashua River attend "North", as it is commonly referred to. However, students from either school can take certain classes at the other school and be bused over. The school's mascot is the Titans.

== History ==
Nashua High School (as the south campus was referred to prior to the split in 2004) has been located at three different locations throughout the city, originally at a location at Spring Street, followed by the building that is now Elm Street Middle School, before finally coming to the current location on Riverside Drive.

Prior to the 2002–03 school year, the Nashua school district followed a less standard placement system, which had the high school comprising grades 10 (sophomore) through 12 (senior), with grade 9 (freshman) being placed in with the city's three junior high schools (now following the middle school system/curriculum).

During the 2002–03 and 2003–04 school years, juniors and seniors attended classes at the newly constructed Nashua High School North campus, while sophomores attended school at the South location while it was being renovated. Until the 2004–05 school year, freshmen still attended class at their respective junior high schools, but received credit and report cards from Nashua High.

== Demographics ==
The demographic breakdown by race/ethnicity of the 1,701 students enrolled for the 2018–19 school year was:

Enrollment by Race/Ethnicity
School Year	American Indian / Alaska Native	Asian	Black	Hispanic	Native Hawaiian / Pacific Islander	White	Two or More Races
2018–19	4 (0.2%)	93 (5.5%)	81 (4.8%)	375 (22%)	1 (0.1%)	1,088 (64%)	59 (3.5%)

== Awards ==
- The New Hampshire Chapter of the American Institute of Architects - Excellence in Architects Award 2006
- NH Excellence in Education – Secondary School of Excellence 2006

== Notable alumni ==
- Kelsey Hogan – basketball coach
- Kevin McGowan – MLB pitcher for the New York Mets
- Kendall Reyes – NFL defensive end

== Sports ==
Nashua High School North athletics teams have earned multiple state championships. The Women's Swimming & Diving team won the school's first state title in the 2006–07 season, and had an undefeated championship season in 2010–11. The Men's baseball team won the championship in the spring of 2011. The Men's Indoor Track team followed suit, winning the Division 1 championship in their 2010–11 and 2016–17 seasons. They were runners up for the 2012–13, 2015–16 2017–18, and 2018–19 indoor seasons and then won the 2013 and 2015 New Hampshire Division 1 Outdoor Track & Field Champions. The Football team captured its lone state title in 2020
