= List of schools in the Nashua school district =

The Nashua School District is a school division serving the students of Nashua, New Hampshire. The current Superintendent of the district is Dr. Mario Andrade. As of 2024, the District Board of Education members are: Jennifer Bishop, Chair; Regan Lamphier, Clerk; Heather Raymond, Jessica Brown, Sharon Giglio, Paula Johnson, Dorothy Oden,Shewanda Daniels-Williams, and Neil Claffey.

== List of schools ==
The district currently has 18 schools serving grades K-12.

=== Early Education ===
- Franklin Street School

Elementary Schools

- Amherst Street Elementary School
- Bicentennial Elementary School
- Birch Hill Elementary School
- Broad Street Elementary School
- Charlotte Avenue Elementary School
- Dr. Norman W. Crisp Elementary School
- Fairgrounds Elementary School
- Ledge Street Elementary School
- Main Dunstable Elementary School
- Mount Pleasant Elementary School
- New Searles Elementary School
- Sunset Heights Elementary School

Middle Schools

- Brian S. McCarthy Middle School
- Fairgrounds Middle School
- Pennichuck Middle School

High Schools

- Nashua High School North
- Nashua High School South

Other schools

- Brentwood Academy
