= Kevin McGowan =

American baseball player (born 1991)

- Pitcher
- Born: October 18, 1991 (age 35); Nashua, New Hampshire
- Batted: Right Threw: Right

MLB debut
- August 22, 2017, for the New York Mets

Last MLB appearance
- October 1, 2017, for the New York Mets

MLB statistics
- Win–loss record: 0-0
- Earned run average: 5.19
- Strikeouts: 8
- Stats at Baseball Reference

Teams
- New York Mets (2017)

Kevin Michael McGowan (born October 18, 1991) is an American former professional baseball pitcher. He has previously played in Major League Baseball (MLB) for the New York Mets.

== Career ==
=== New York Mets ===
McGowan attended Nashua High School North in Nashua, New Hampshire, where he played four years of baseball at Holman Stadium and ice hockey. He was named the Nashua Telegraph Baseball Player of the Year as a high school senior.

McGowan played college baseball at Franklin Pierce University. He was drafted by the New York Mets in the 13th round of the 2013 MLB draft.

McGowan was called up to the majors for the first time on August 13, 2017 after the Mets traded infielder Neil Walker to the Milwaukee Brewers. McGowan was demoted to the minors on August 17 without having appeared in a game.

McGowan was recalled to the majors on August 22 after Steven Matz was placed on this disabled list. He made his major league debut that night at Citi Field against the Arizona Diamondbacks in relief of Tommy Milone. He was designated for assignment on January 18, 2018. He was released on September 25, 2018.

=== Sugar Land Skeeters ===
On March 19, 2019, McGowan signed with the Sugar Land Skeeters of the independent Atlantic League of Professional Baseball. In four starts with the Skeeters, McGowan went 2–2 with a 2.29 ERA.

=== Washington Nationals ===
On May 21, 2019, McGowan's contract was purchased by the Washington Nationals. He was assigned to the minor leagues and became a free agent at the conclusion of the 2019 season.

=== Eastern Reyes del Tigre ===
In July 2020, McGowan signed on to play for the Eastern Reyes del Tigre of the Constellation Energy League (a makeshift 4-team independent league created as a result of the COVID-19 pandemic) for the 2020 season.

=== Lexington Legends ===
On February 26, 2021, McGowan signed with the Lexington Legends of the Atlantic League of Professional Baseball. He only appeared in 5 games during the season, posting a 4–1 record with a 4.50 ERA and 22 strikeouts. McGowan was released by the Legends on September 3, 2021.

=== Tecolotes de los Dos Laredos ===
On June 24, 2023, McGowan signed with the Tecolotes de los Dos Laredos of the Mexican League. In 9 games for the Tecolotes, he struggled to a 9.39 ERA with 4 strikeouts across 7 2/3 innings of work. On February 29, 2024, McGowan was released by Dos Laredos.

== Personal life ==
McGowan grew up a Boston Red Sox fan and his favorite baseball players were David Ortiz, Manny Ramírez and Pedro Martínez.

His uncle, Sean McGowan, played college baseball at Boston College, was selected in the third round of the 1999 MLB draft by the San Francisco Giants and played six seasons of minor league baseball.
