= Stanley E. Bogdan =

American businessman (1918–2011)

Stanley E. Bogdan (December 16, 1918 – March 27, 2011) was the founder of S.E. Custom Built, a company dedicated to the handmade construction of fly reels.

== Early life ==
Bogdan was born on December 16, 1918, in Nashua, New Hampshire, and lived there throughout his entire life. He became interested in fly fishing at an early age when he began receiving outdated copies of a hunting and fishing magazine from a local sports retailer. At age 13, Bogdan was tying his own flies and would then become immersed in the sport.

== Career ==
Upon graduating high school, Bogdan began work at Rollins Engine Company, a local engines manufacturer in Nashua. Later on, while working as a machinist, he began constructing some of the first prototypes for his reels.

Bogdan sold his first set of reels in 1955. At the New England Sportsmen's Show, he received $150 from Julian Crandall for a set of 10 reels. That same year Bogdan would make a deal with Abercrombie & Fitch, one of the day's leading marketers of sport's goods, for a set of 40 reels.

At this time, Bogdan would retire work at the factories and begin working entirely on his reel making company, S.E. Custom Built.

Bogdan's son, Stephen, joined him in the company in September 1973. Stephen later purchased the company and became the sole owner in 1996.

== Personal life ==
Bogdan married Phyllis and had two children, Cheryl Doughty and Stephen. His wife, Phyllis, died in 1995. Bogdan died on March 27, 2011.
