= Kendall Reyes =

American football player (born 1989)

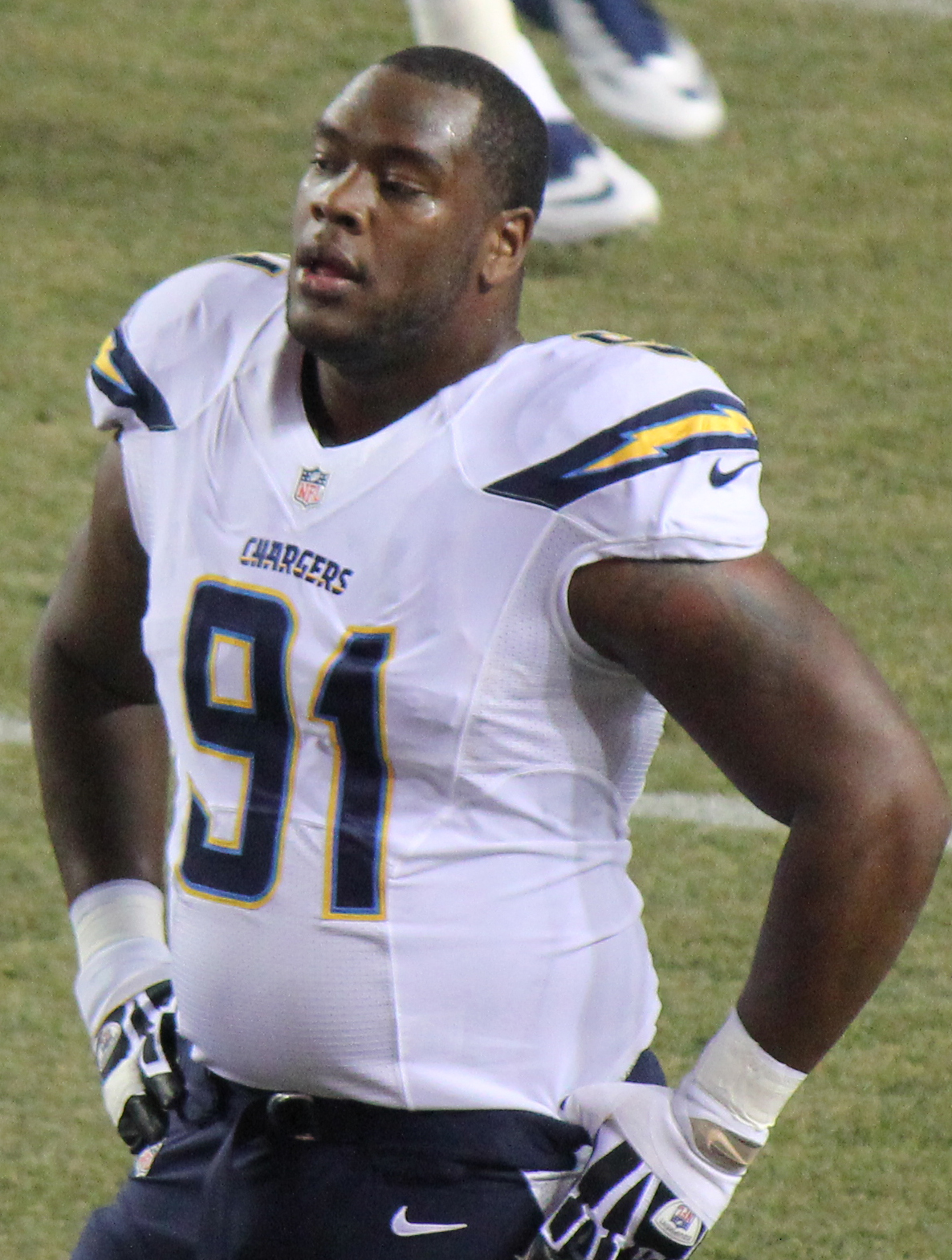
- Reyes with the San Diego Chargers in 2013

No. 91, 97, 98
- Position: Defensive end

Personal information
- Born: September 26, 1989 (age 37); Nashua, New Hampshire, U.S.
- Listed height: 6 ft 4 in (1.93 m)
- Listed weight: 300 lb (136 kg)

Career information
- High school: North (Nashua)
- College: Connecticut (2007–2011)
- NFL draft: 2012: 2nd round, 49th overall pick

Career history
- San Diego Chargers (2012–2015); Washington Redskins (2016); Kansas City Chiefs (2016); New York Jets (2018)*
- * Offseason or practice squad member only

Awards and highlights
- 2× First-team All-Big East (2010, 2011)

Career NFL statistics
- Total tackles: 146
- Sacks: 14.5
- Pass deflections: 8
- Interceptions: 1
- Stats at Pro Football Reference

Kendall A. Reyes (born September 26, 1989) is an American former professional football player who was a defensive end in the National Football League (NFL). He played college football for the Connecticut Huskies. In 2010, he served as one of four team captains and was named first-team All-Big East Conference following the season. Reyes was selected by the San Diego Chargers in the second round of the 2012 NFL draft, and was also a member of the Washington Redskins, Kansas City Chiefs, and New York Jets.

== Early life ==
Kendall Reyes attended Nashua High School North in Nashua, New Hampshire from 2003–2007. In football, Reyes was a standout wide receiver, tight end, linebacker and defensive end. He was twice named All-State and also a two-time All-Conference pick. Following his senior year, he was selected to play at the Shriners' All-Star Game.

Reyes was also a three-sport athlete at Nashua North, also playing basketball and track & field during his high school career. As a sophomore in 2005, he placed eighth in the long jump with a leap of 6.18 meters (20 ft, 3.5 in) at the NHIAA Meet of Champions. At the 2006 NHIAA Class L Track Championships, he earned a third-place finish in the discus with a throw of 52.12 meters (171 ft), while also placing sixth in the high jump (1.83m or 6'0"). He posted a personal-best throw of 14.35 meters (47'1") in the shot put as a senior.

Reyes was not that heavily recruited out of high school, and he only received 3 offers from Division 1 schools (Connecticut, New Hampshire). On November 11, 2006, Reyes verbally committed to Connecticut.

== Professional career ==
Pre-draft measurables
Height	Weight	Arm length	Hand span	Wingspan	40-yard dash	10-yard split	20-yard split	20-yard shuttle	Three-cone drill	Vertical jump	Broad jump	Bench press
6 ft 4 1/8 in (1.93 m)	299 lb (136 kg)	33 1/4 in (0.84 m)	9 1/2 in (0.24 m)	6 ft 7 1/2 in (2.02 m)	4.95 s	1.69 s	2.86 s	4.53 s	7.43 s	34.5 in (0.88 m)	9 ft 5 in (2.87 m)	36 reps
All values from NFL Combine

=== San Diego Chargers ===
When the Chargers drafted him with the 49th overall pick in the 2012 NFL draft, Reyes became Nashua High School North’s first NFL draft pick and the first player from Nashua to be drafted since the Cincinnati Bengals selected tackle Herb Webster in the fifth round of the 1988 NFL draft. He was also the highest drafted defensive lineman in school history.

In his rookie season, Reyes led the Chargers’ defensive line with 19 quarterback pressures and 15 quarterback hits, and he finished the year third on the team with 5.5 sacks and nine tackles for loss. He recorded his first two NFL sacks against future Hall of Fame quarterback Peyton Manning and on December 23, during a road win against the New York Jets, racked up 3.5 sacks, the most by a Chargers rookie in 26 years. Reyes closed out his initial campaign by earning All-Rookie honors from ESPN.com.

In 2013, Reyes was named starter right next to Corey Liuget on the defensive line. Reyes went on to play all 16 games as a starter and managed to collect 34 tackles, 5 sacks, and 2 passes defended.

=== Washington Redskins ===
Reyes signed a one-year contract with the Washington Commanders on March 11, 2016. He was released by the Commanders on October 5, 2016.

=== Kansas City Chiefs ===
On October 18, 2016, Reyes was signed by the Kansas City Chiefs.

=== New York Jets ===
On August 3, 2018, Reyes signed with the New York Jets. He was released on August 31, 2018.

== Coaching career ==
Reyes began his coaching career in January 2019 at the University of New Hampshire as the assistant defensive tackles coach.

== NFL career statistics ==
Legend
**Bold**	Career high

=== Regular season ===
Year	Team	Games		Tackles					Interceptions					Fumbles			
Year	Team	GP	GS	Cmb	Solo	Ast	Sck	TFL	Int	Yds	TD	Lng	PD	FF	FR	Yds	TD
2012	SDG	**16**	4	28	16	12	**5.5**	**7**	0	0	0	0	1	0	0	0	0
2013	SDG	**16**	**16**	**34**	**25**	9	5.0	5	0	0	0	0	2	0	0	0	0
2014	SDG	**16**	15	32	15	**17**	1.0	2	0	0	0	0	0	0	0	0	0
2015	SDG	**16**	15	32	**25**	7	2.0	5	**1**	**1**	0	**1**	**4**	0	0	0	0
2016	WAS	2	0	5	3	2	0.0	0	0	0	0	0	0	0	0	0	0
2016	KAN	10	0	15	12	3	1.0	3	0	0	0	0	1	0	0	0	0
		76	50	146	96	50	14.5	22	1	1	0	1	8	0	0	0	0

=== Playoffs ===
Year	Team	Games		Tackles					Interceptions					Fumbles			
Year	Team	GP	GS	Cmb	Solo	Ast	Sck	TFL	Int	Yds	TD	Lng	PD	FF	FR	Yds	TD
2013	SDG	**2**	**2**	**3**	**1**	**2**	0.0	0	0	0	0	0	**1**	0	0	0	0
2016	KAN	1	0	**3**	**1**	**2**	0.0	0	0	0	0	0	0	0	0	0	0
		3	2	6	2	4	0.0	0	0	0	0	0	1	0	0	0	0

== Personal life ==
Reyes still spends a lot of time in Nashua during the offseason. In March 2013, the Boys and Girls Club of Greater Nashua inducted him into its Hall of Fame. Reyes spent much of his time as a youth at the Club, where he sharpened his athletic and academic skills. Now he works with the Club to help develop initiatives for youths. A former class president at Nashua North High, Reyes also spends time at his alma mater talking to student-athletes about education and being good community citizens.
