= Sizzle Acquisition =

American special purpose acquisition company

Sizzle Acquisition Corp.
- Trade name: Sizzle Acquisition
- Company type: Public
- Traded as: Nasdaq: SZZL
- Industry: Special-purpose acquisition company
- Founded: October 12, 2020; 4 years ago
- Headquarters: Washington, D.C., U.S.
- Key people: Steve Salis (CEO); Daniel Lee (CFO)
- Website: sizzlespac.com/home/default.aspx

Sizzle Acquisition Corp. is a publicly traded American special purpose acquisition company (SPAC) headquartered in Washington, D.C. Founded in October 2020, the company raised $155 million in a November 2021 initial public offering (IPO).

== History ==
The company was founded in October 2020 by Steve Salis, who is also the current CEO and chairman of the firm. Other key figures in the management team include Jamie Karson, Nestor Nova, and Daniel Lee. The board of directors consists of Karen Kelley, David Perlin, and Warren Thompson.

The firm specializes in the restaurant, hospitality, food and beverage, retail, consumer, food-related technology, and real estate sectors. It primarily aims at mergers, capital stock exchanges, asset acquisitions, and reorganizations with one or more businesses.

Sizzle Acquisition Corp. went public in November 2021, raising a total of $155 million. Two years later, it announced a strategic merger with a unit of European Lithium Ltd. to form Critical Metals Corp., shifting its focus to developing a sustainable source lithium hydroxide to meet the needs of European battery and EV manufacturers.

In 2024, it was reported that the merger of the two companies had been completed, resulting in the creation of Critical Metals.

=== Critical Metals ===
It is primarily involved in the development of the Wolfsberg Lithium Project in Carinthia, Austria. The project aims to start lithium hydroxide production by 2026 and expects to supply about 10,500 metric tons of lithium annually. Wolfsberg is projected to be the first major source of battery-grade lithium in Europe, potentially supporting the production of nearly 200,000 electric vehicles per year.
