= Steve Salis =

American entrepreneur, co-founder of &pizza

- Born: 1983 (age 42–43); Nashua, New Hampshire
- Education: University of New Hampshire
- Occupation: Entrepreneur
- Known for: Co-founder, &pizza

Steve Salis (born 1983) is an American entrepreneur, businessman and investor. He is the owner of Salis Holdings, the founder and CEO of hospitality platform Catalogue and Sizzle Acquisition Corp., the SPAC platform that in 2024 completed a business combination with European Lithium Limited to create Critical Metals Corp. He is also the co-founder of &pizza.

== Early life ==
Salis was born in Nashua, New Hampshire in 1983 to a working-class family. His father operated a gas station and his mother worked a variety of jobs. He attended the University of New Hampshire on a basketball scholarship, studying economics and business administration before leaving school and relocating to New York City, where he supported himself working in nightlife as a doorman before transitioning into hospitality.

== Career ==
Salis began his career in the fashion industry in New York City before transitioning into hospitality consulting, advising restaurants and bars on operations, management and growth.

=== &pizza ===
In 2012, Steve Salis co-founded &pizza alongside Michael Lastoria while in his mid-20s. Salis was the CEO from its inception until 2015. In 2017, &pizza advocated a cause in Congress, a $15 minimum wage by 2023. Salis remained the major shareholder in the company until 2019, when he divested his holdings for an undisclosed sum.

=== Salis Holdings ===
In 2015, Salis founded Salis Holdings, a diversified investment company based in the Washington, D.C. metropolitan area. Through Salis Holdings, he has accumulated a portfolio of restaurant, hospitality and consumer brands, alongside real estate assets and a range of other investments.

The company operates Catalogue, a hospitality platform designed to provide centralized operational, financial, technology, marketing and growth support services across portfolio companies.

Brands associated with Catalogue include Ted's Bulletin, Kramers Bookstore, Federalist Pig, and Honeymoon Chicken.

Kramers, formerly known as Kramerbooks & Afterwords, is an independent bookstore, restaurant and bar in Washington, D.C.'s Dupont Circle neighborhood. Founded in 1976 by Bill Kramer, David Tenney and Henry Posner, the business became known as a local meeting place for residents, authors and political figures. It was the first combined bookstore and café in Washington, D.C., and its Afterwords café later became a model for other bookstores seeking to give customers a place to sit and read. In 2016, Salis agreed to acquire the business, with co-founder David Tenney initially retaining a part-ownership stake. Washingtonian later reported that Salis became sole proprietor in October 2017, buying out the remaining original owner. Under Salis's ownership, Kramers rebranded its restaurant component from Afterwords Café to All Day by Kramers and in 2021 expanded into an adjoining storefront at 1521 Connecticut Avenue NW to add a bar.

Federalist Pig and Honeymoon Chicken have received Michelin Bib Gourmand designations.

In August 2026, Salis purchased the former Woodmont Grill property in Bethesda, Maryland from Hillstone Restaurant Group for $7million, for a Ted's Bulletin location scheduled to open in 2027.

=== Real estate ===
In addition to hospitality and public markets investments, Salis has invested in and acquired a number of real estate projects in the Washington, D.C. metropolitan area.

In 2018, Salis invested in the development of several single-family homes on Foxhall Road in Washington, DC's Palisades Neighborhood. Defects found on the properties prompted lawsuits by new owners alleging poor workmanship and claimed $4 million in damages.

=== SPACs and public markets ===
In 2021, Salis launched Sizzle Acquisition Corp., a special-purpose acquisition company (SPAC) focused on acquisitions within consumer and retail sectors. The company completed an upsized $158 million initial public offering on Nasdaq, trading under the ticker SZZLU.

In 2022 Salis announced a nearly billion-dollar lithium battery merger in the public market space through Sizzle Acquisition Corp. In February 2024, Sizzle Acquisition Corp. completed its business combination with European Lithium Limited, creating Critical Metals Corp.

In April 2025, Salis launched Sizzle Acquisition Corp. II. The company completed a $230 million initial public offering on Nasdaq under the ticker SZZL.

In April 2026, Sizzle Acquisition Corp. II announced a definitive business combination with Trasteel Holding S.A.,a global industrial and commodity trading platform, implying a pro forma enterprise value of approximately $1.3 billion, with the combined company expected to list on NASDAQ under the ticker TSTL.
