= &pizza =

American restaurant chain

- Type: Private
- Industry: Restaurants
- Founded: 2012; 14 years ago
- Founders: Michael Lastoria (CEO); Steve Salis
- Headquarters: Washington, D.C., USA
- Number of locations: 55
- Area served: East Coast of the United States
- Key people: Mike Burns (CEO)
- Products: Italian cuisine
- Website: andpizza.com

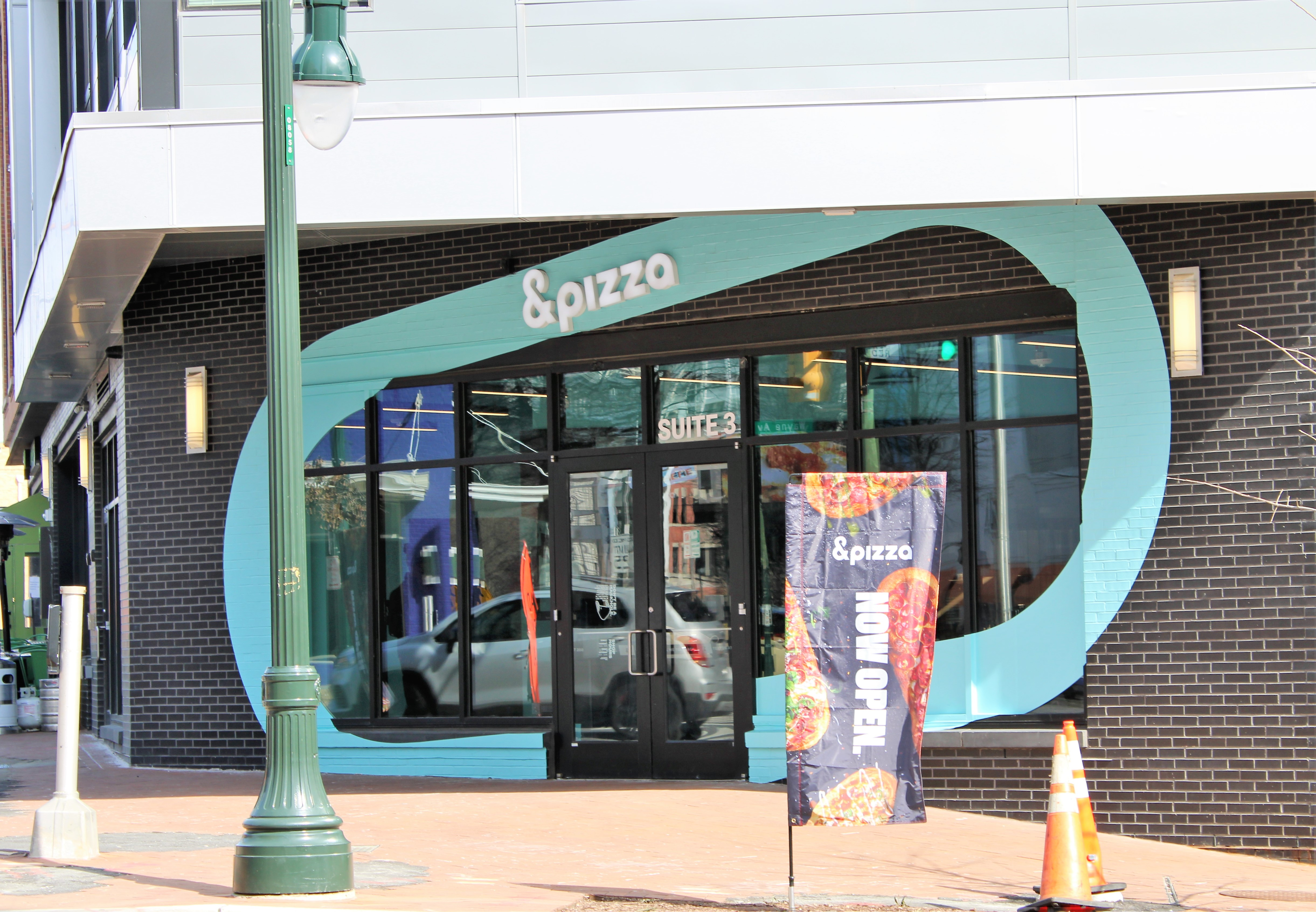
&pizza franchise in Silver Spring, Maryland, in 2021

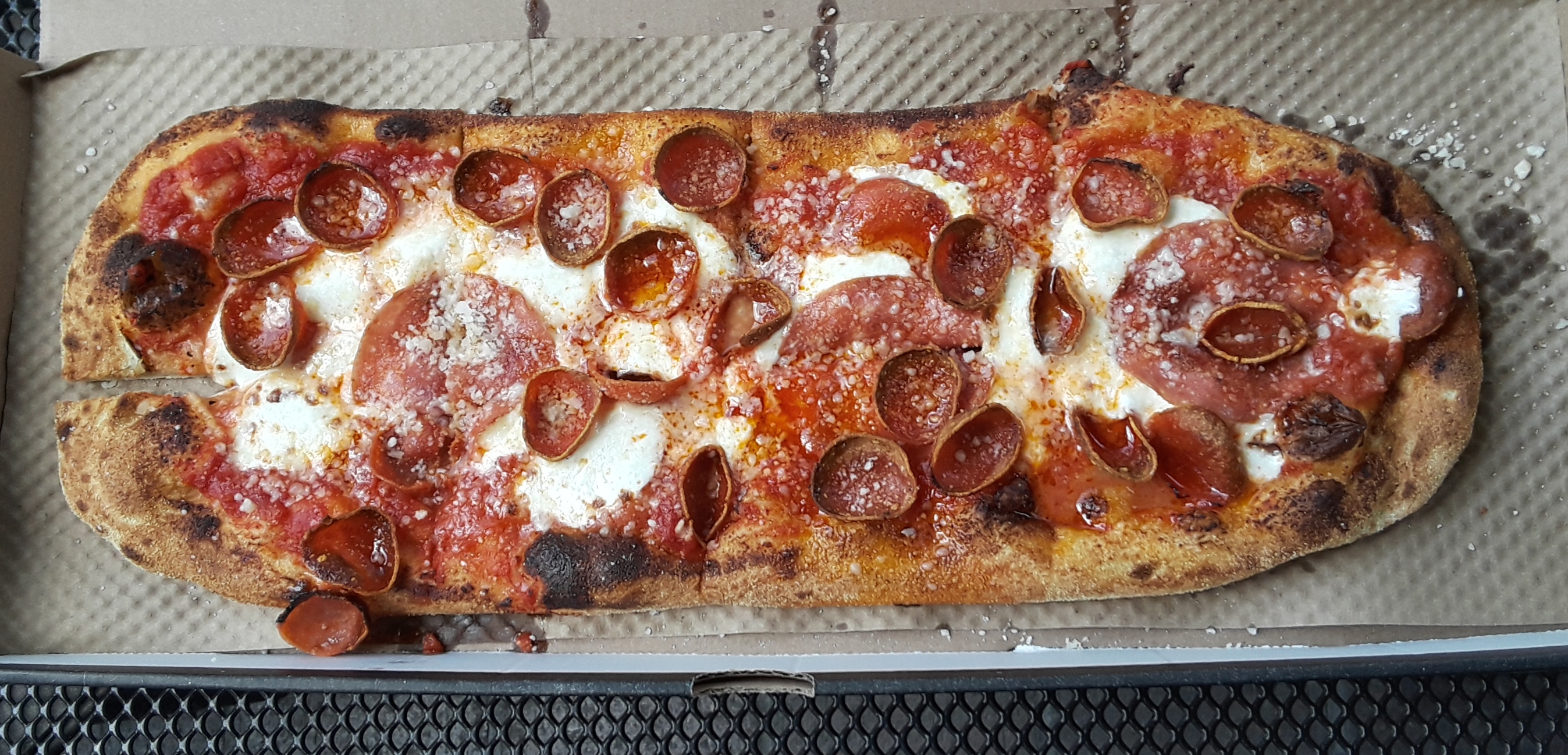
Typical oblong pizza from &pizza in Washington, D.C., in April 2024

&pizza (pronounced "And Pizza") is an American fast casual pizza restaurant chain, with 55 locations in Washington, D.C., Maryland, Virginia, New York, New Jersey, and Pennsylvania. The restaurant sells personal and customizable oblong-shaped pizzas. They tailor each location to its neighborhood, with local artists designing the interiors. Some locations serve beer, wine, and cocktails. In 2025, the company launched a franchise program and began expanding through multi-unit franchise agreements.

== History ==
&pizza (originally called H&pizza) was founded by Michael Lastoria and Steve Salis, with the first shop opening in July 2012 on H Street in Northeast, Washington, D.C. Salis was CEO from inception until 2015. Currently, Lastoria is CEO and creative director. In 2016, the restaurant received a $25 million investment from AVALT, to expand into New York City, opening its first location there in June 2017. In July 2017, &pizza and the bakery Milk Bar announced a joint venture, to open in Harvard Square in Cambridge, Massachusetts. In October 2017, &pizza announced funding from RSE Ventures.

The restaurant had advocated in Congress for a $15 minimum wage by 2023.

In 2025, &pizza launched a franchise program as part of a strategy to expand beyond its traditional Mid-Atlantic footprint. The company later became part of Latitude Food Group, a restaurant holding company that also owns Tijuana Flats. By 2026, franchise agreements had been signed for development in Florida, Georgia, North Carolina, and South Carolina, while a company-owned restaurant was being developed in Las Vegas.

In May 2026, &pizza announced its first international franchise agreement. The company signed a multi-unit development deal with The 90s Venture to open 10 restaurants in India by 2032, with the first location planned for Mumbai in 2027. Company executives said that India had generated more international franchise interest than any other market and that the initial expansion would focus on a single region before broader expansion across the country.

== Reception ==
The Washington Post called the restaurant "the pizza shop for the 21st century", describing it as "Chipotle for pizza". It was named best pizza in the Washington City Paper Best of D.C. in 2017; was #12 on the Restaurant Business 2017 Future 50 list of fastest-growing small concept restaurants; and was on the Fast Company World's Most Innovative Companies 2018 list.

== Marketing ==
Since 2015, the restaurant has held an annual Pi Day tradition, where they hold weddings in their pizza shops, offering free pizza, cake, alcohol, officiants and photography. In 2018, &pizza hosted over a dozen weddings at locations in DC, Baltimore, New York, and Philadelphia. For employees who want it, the restaurant pays for them to get a tattoo of its ampersand logo. The advocacy group Our Harvard Square has criticized &pizza for encouraging tattoos of its logo on employees and for referring to employees as "tribe members".

The restaurant chain filed a trademark dispute against @pizza, a UK-based chain. In 2020, the claim for trespassing and copyright infringement was dismissed after a three year court battle involving the District Court and the Court of Appeals for the D.C. Circuit.

== See also ==
- List of pizza chains of the United States
