= List of University of New Hampshire alumni =

This is a list of notable alumni of the University of New Hampshire.

== Arts ==
=== Writers and journalists ===
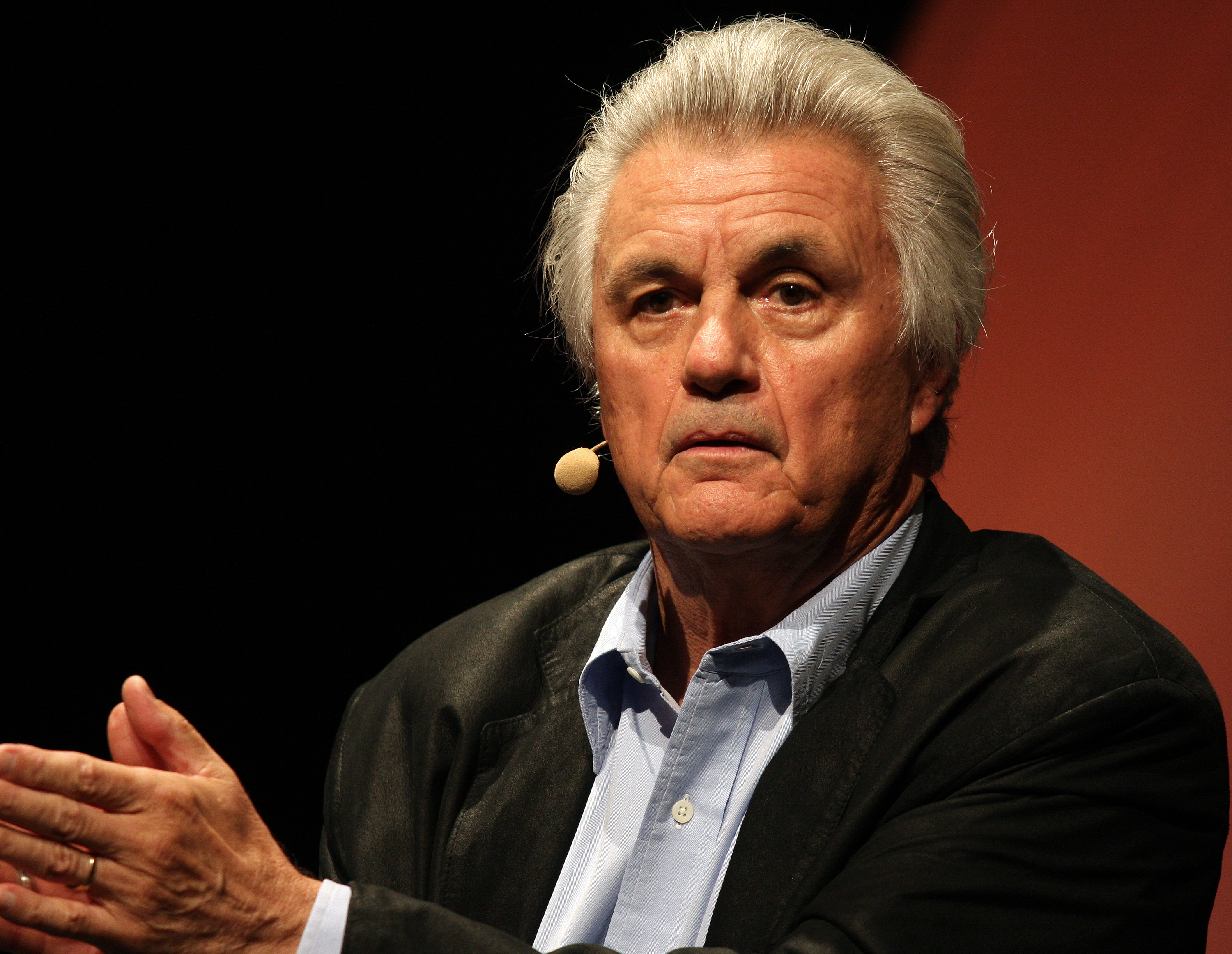
John Irving

- Jason Brennan (b. 1979), philosopher
- Brendan DuBois (born c. 1959), writer, author of Resurrection Day (1982)
- Daniel Ford (b. 1931), author/journalist, resident scholar at the University of New Hampshire (1954)
- Ursula Hegi (b. 1946), novelist, including best-selling Oprah's Book Club novel Stones from the River (1978, MA 1979)
- John Irving (b. 1942), Academy Award-winning screenwriter and novelist (1965)
- Michael Kelly (1957–2003), editor-at-Large of the Atlantic Monthly, first US reporter killed in the Iraq War (1979)
- Richard Lederer (b. 1938), linguist, columnist, and humorist (Ph.D. 1980)
- Jackie MacMullan (b. 1960), sportswriter, columnist, editor and author
- Alice McDermott (b. 1953), author, National Book Award winner (1998), Writer-in-Residence at Johns Hopkins University (MA 1978)
- Joseph Moreau, author of Schoolbook Nation and teacher
- Brendan Emmett Quigley (b. 1974), crossword puzzle constructor, author, musician
- Laurel Thatcher Ulrich (b. 1938), Pulitzer Prize–winning author, professor of history at Harvard University (Ph.D.)
- Barbara Walsh (b. 1958), Pulitzer Prize–winning journalist and author (1981)
- Thomas Williams (1926–1990), National Book Award-winning novelist, and teacher at UNH
- Wayne Worcester (b. 1947), author/journalist, professor of journalism at the University of Connecticut

=== Film ===
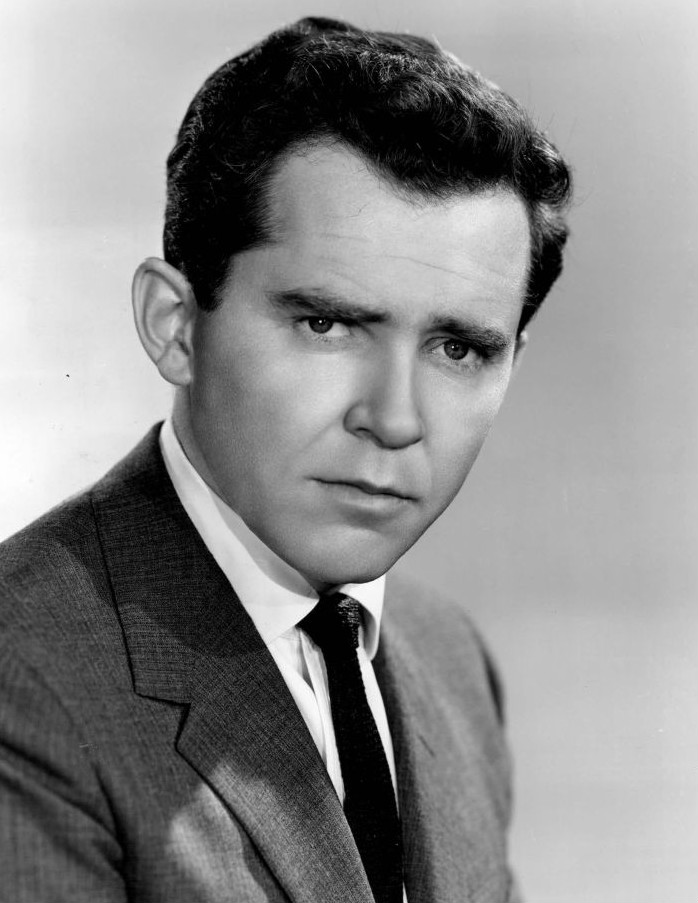
James Broderick

- James Broderick (1927–1982), actor, Dog Day Afternoon, Family (1948)
- Dane DiLiegro (2007–2011), actor, Prey (2022), American Horror Stories (2021)
- Michael Graziadei (b. 1979), actor, The Young and the Restless (2001)
- Peter Jurasik (b. 1950), actor, Babylon 5, Hill Street Blues (1972)
- Jennifer Lee (b. 1971), writer, director of Frozen (1992)
- Mike O'Malley (b. 1966), actor, Yes, Dear, The Mike O'Malley Show (1988)
- Michael Ontkean (b. 1946), starred in 1977 movie Slap Shot, TV series Twin Peaks (1970)
- Andrew Robinson (b. 1942), actor, director, author, Dirty Harry, Star Trek: Deep Space Nine (transferred)
- Blanchard Ryan (b. 1967), actress, Open Water (1989)
- Duncan Watson (b. 1963), voice actor, voice of Charlie Brown (1975–1977)

=== Music ===
- Barbara Bonney (b. 1956), soprano
- Jeff Coffin (b. 1965), jazz saxophonist, flutist, clarinetist
- Spose (b. 1985), rapper, producer (transferred)

=== Visual arts ===
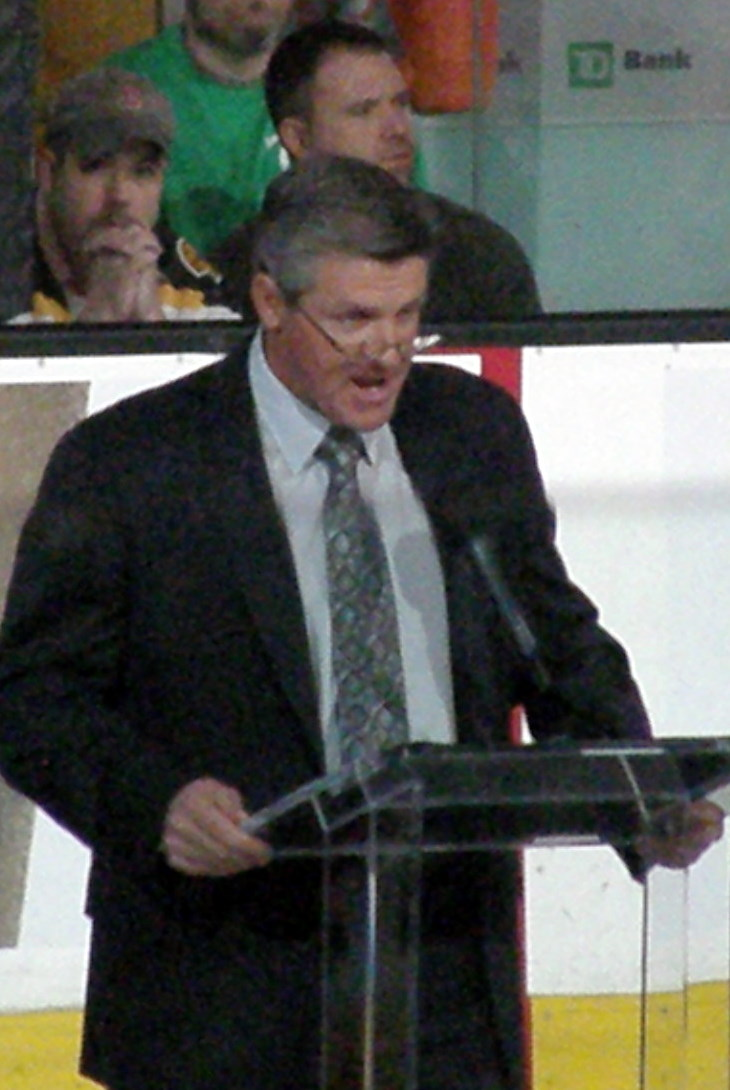
Andy Brickley

- James Aponovich, painter, New Hampshire Artist Laureate 2006 (1971)
- Richard Whitney (b. 1946), portrait painter, Honorary Doctor of Fine Arts (2015) (1968)

=== Television and radio ===
- Andy Brickley (b. 1961), Bruins color analyst, NESN, played in the NHL for 14 years, including four years for the Boston Bruins (1982)
- Marcy Carsey (b. 1944), television producer, Carsey-Werner (Mork and Mindy, The Cosby Show, Roseanne, 3rd Rock from the Sun, Men Behaving Badly) (1966)
- Jim Colony, sportscaster for Pittsburgh's KDKA-FM, "The Fan"
- Jack Edwards (b. 1957), sportscaster, formerly on Versus, and ESPN; former play-by-play announcer for Boston Bruins games on NESN
- Mary Ann Esposito (b. 1942), TV chef of Ciao! Italia (MA 1991)
- Sally Hirsh-Dickinson (b. 1971), New Hampshire Public Radio producer and host, professor of English at Rivier University
- Natalie Jacobson (b. 1943), retired news anchor on WCVB-TV (1965)
- Chris Wragge (b. 1970), news anchor on WCBS-TV

== Athletics ==
=== Ice hockey ===
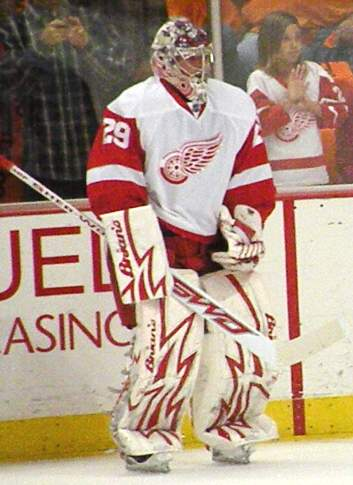
Ty Conklin

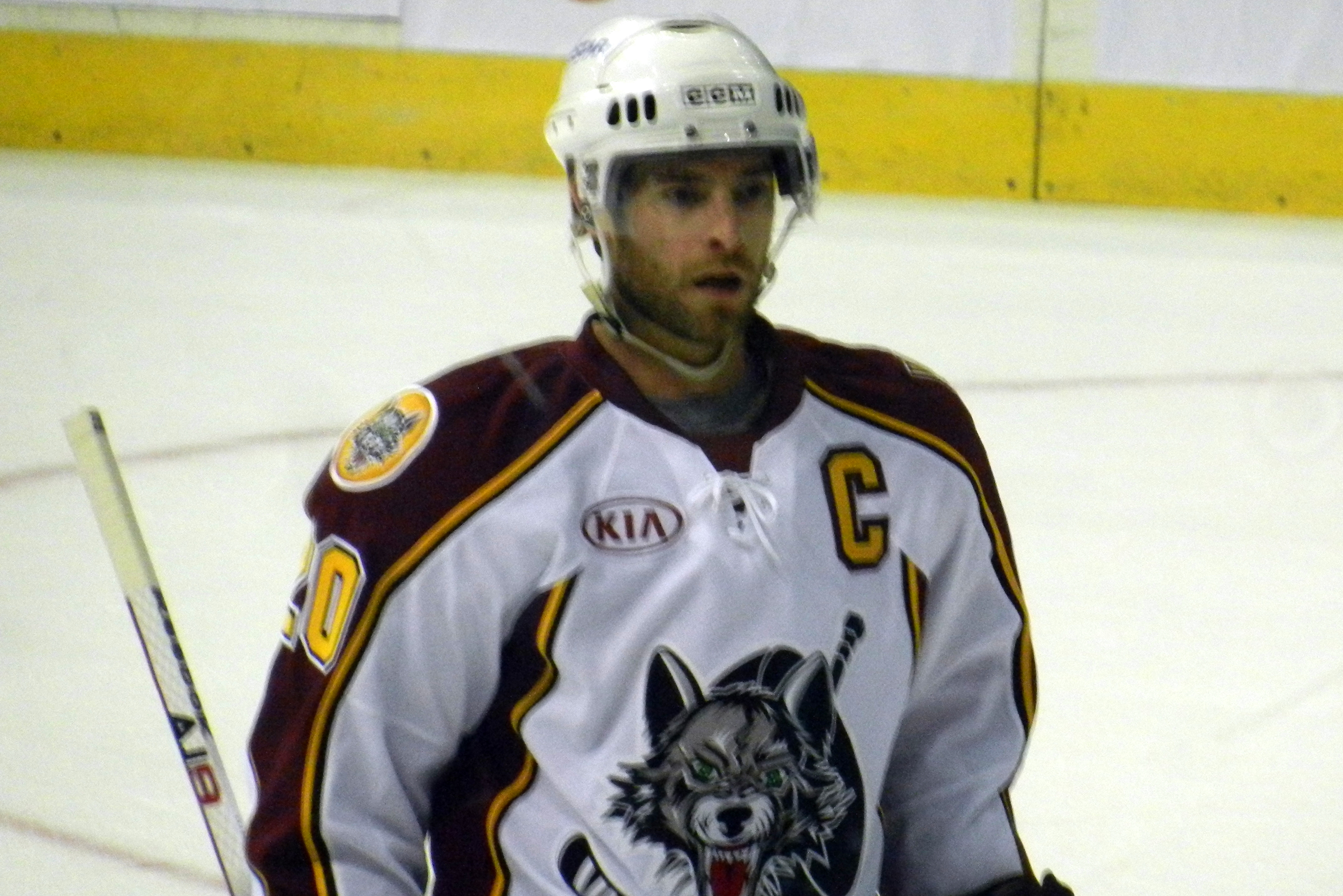
Darren Haydar

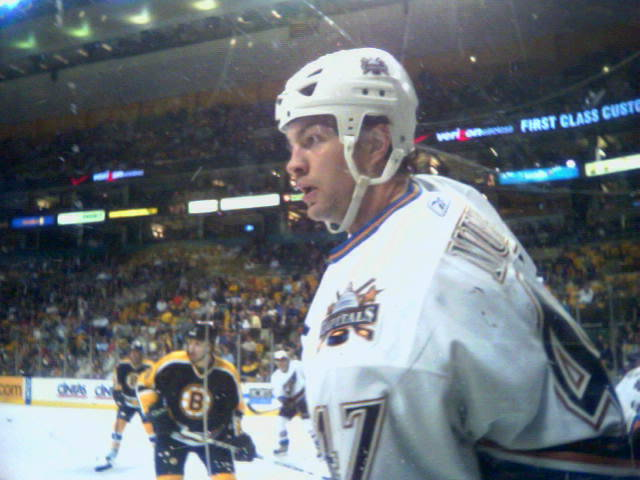
Bryan Muir

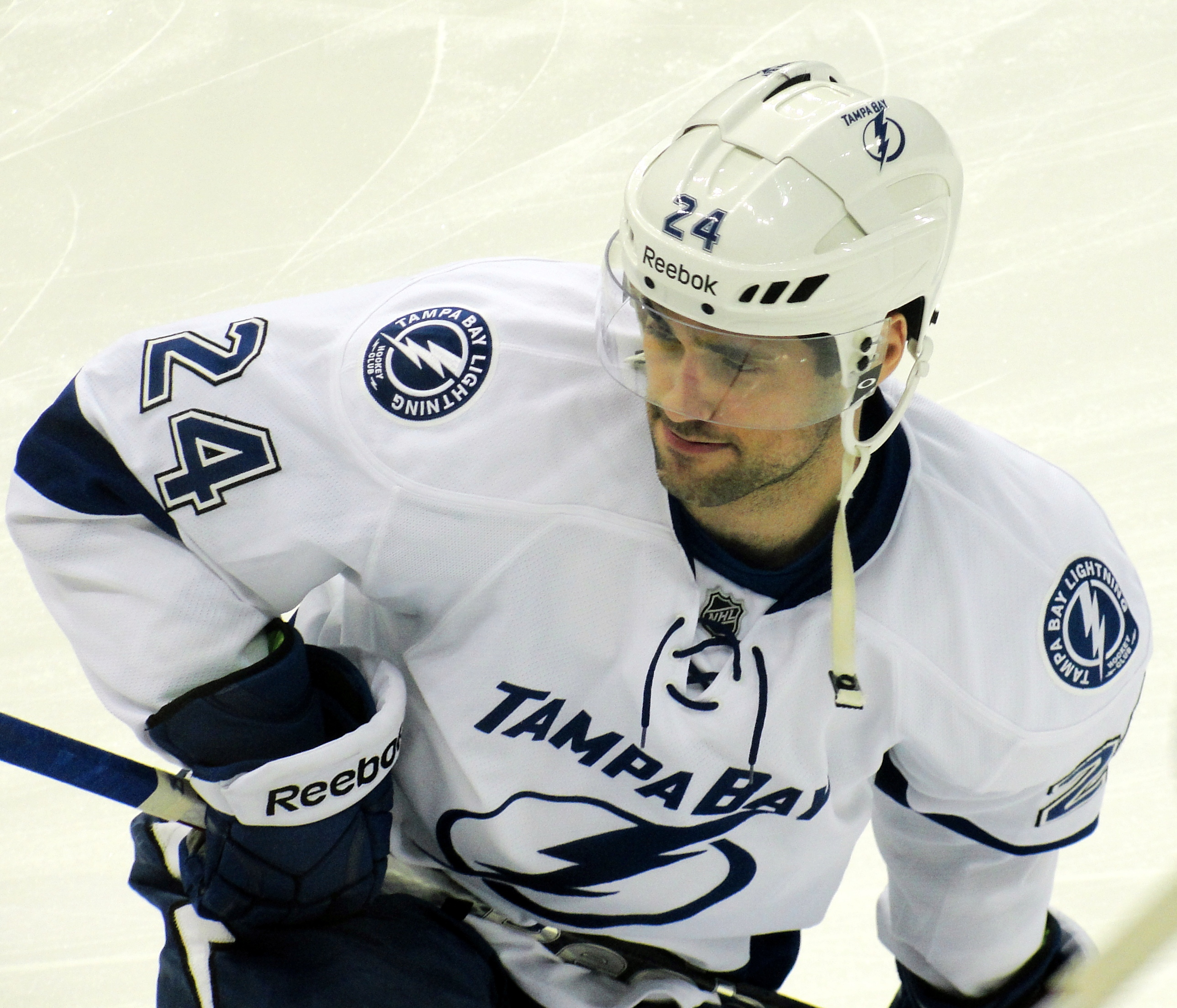
Trevor Smith

- Derek Bekar (b. 1975), professional ice hockey forward, St. Louis Blues, Los Angeles Kings, New York Islanders (1998)
- Kacey Bellamy (b. 1987), two-time Olympic silver medalist, women's ice hockey (2009)
- Austin Block (b. 1989), ice hockey player (2013)
- Eric Boguniecki (b. 1975), professional ice hockey forward, New York Islanders, Pittsburgh Penguins, St. Louis Blues, Florida Panthers (1997)
- Bobby Butler (b. 1987), professional ice hockey forward, Ottawa Senators (2010)
- Ty Conklin (b. 1976), professional ice hockey goaltender, St. Louis Blues, Detroit Red Wings, Pittsburgh Penguins, Buffalo Sabres, Columbus Blue Jackets, Edmonton Oilers (2001)
- Ralph Cox (b. 1957), last player cut from famed 1980 Winter Olympics team that won gold at Lake Placid; first-team All-Conference 1978–1979 and ECAC Hockey Player of the Year 1979; team's leading goal-scorer three consecutive years; only UNH player to score 40 goals in two different seasons; inducted into New Hampshire Athletics Hall of Fame 1986 (1979)
- Kevin Dean (b. 1969), professional ice hockey defenseman, Chicago Blackhawks, Dallas Stars, Atlanta Thrashers, New Jersey Devils, Stanley Cup champion with Devils (1991)
- Tricia Dunn-Luoma (b. 1974), three-time Olympian, gold medalist, women's ice hockey (1995)
- Samantha "Sam" Faber (b. 1987), professional ice hockey player (2009)
- Bobby Gould (b. 1957), forward, Atlanta/Calgary Flames, Washington Capitals, Boston Bruins, two-time Selke Trophy nominee (1979)
- Darren Haydar (b. 1979), professional ice hockey forward, Detroit Red Wings, Atlanta Thrashers, Nashville Predators (2002)
- Colin Hemingway (b. 1980), professional ice hockey forward, St. Louis Blues (2003)
- Jason Krog (b. 1975), professional ice hockey forward, Vancouver Canucks, New York Rangers, Atlanta Thrashers, New York Islanders, Anaheim Ducks, New York Rangers, 1999 Hobey Baker Award winner (1999)
- Rod Langway (b. 1957), professional ice hockey defenseman, played for Montreal Canadiens 1979–82, Washington Capitals 1982–93, elected to Hockey Hall of Fame in 2002, Norris Trophy winner 1982 and 1983 (1977)
- Dave Lumley (b. 1954), professional ice hockey forward, two-time Stanley Cup champion with Edmonton Oilers (1977)
- Jacob Micflikier (b. 1984), professional ice hockey forward, EHC Biel in the Swiss National League A (NLA) (2007)
- Mark Mowers (b. 1974), professional ice hockey forward, Anaheim Ducks, Boston Bruins, Detroit Red Wings, Nashville Predators (1998)
- Bryan Muir (b. 1973), professional ice hockey defenseman, Washington Capitals, Los Angeles Kings, Colorado Avalanche, Tampa Bay Lightning, Chicago Blackhawks, New Jersey Devils, Edmonton Oilers, Stanley Cup champion with Avalanche (1995)
- Eric Nickulas (b. 1975), professional ice hockey forward, Boston Bruins, St. Louis Blues, Chicago Blackhawks (1997)
- Trevor Smith (b. 1985), professional ice hockey centre (2007)
- Garrett Stafford (b. 1980), professional ice hockey defenseman, Dallas Stars (current), Detroit Red Wings (former) (2003)
- Kevin Regan (b. 1984), professional ice hockey goalie, Fife Flyers, finalist for Hobey Baker Award, all-time leader in save percentage in Hockey East conference games (2008)
- James van Riemsdyk (b. 1989), professional ice hockey left winger, Toronto Maple Leafs, Philadelphia Flyers (2009)
- Trevor van Riemsdyk (b. 1991), professional ice hockey defenseman, Carolina Hurricanes, Chicago Blackhawks (2014)
- Erin Whitten (b. 1971), first woman to win professional hockey game; replaced Alan Harvey due to injury in second period, stopped 15 of 19 shots in 6–5 win over Dayton in ECHL Toledo Storm (1993)
- Daniel Winnik (b. 1985), professional ice hockey forward, San Jose Sharks, Anaheim Ducks, Toronto Maple Leafs, Washington Capitals (2006)

=== Football ===
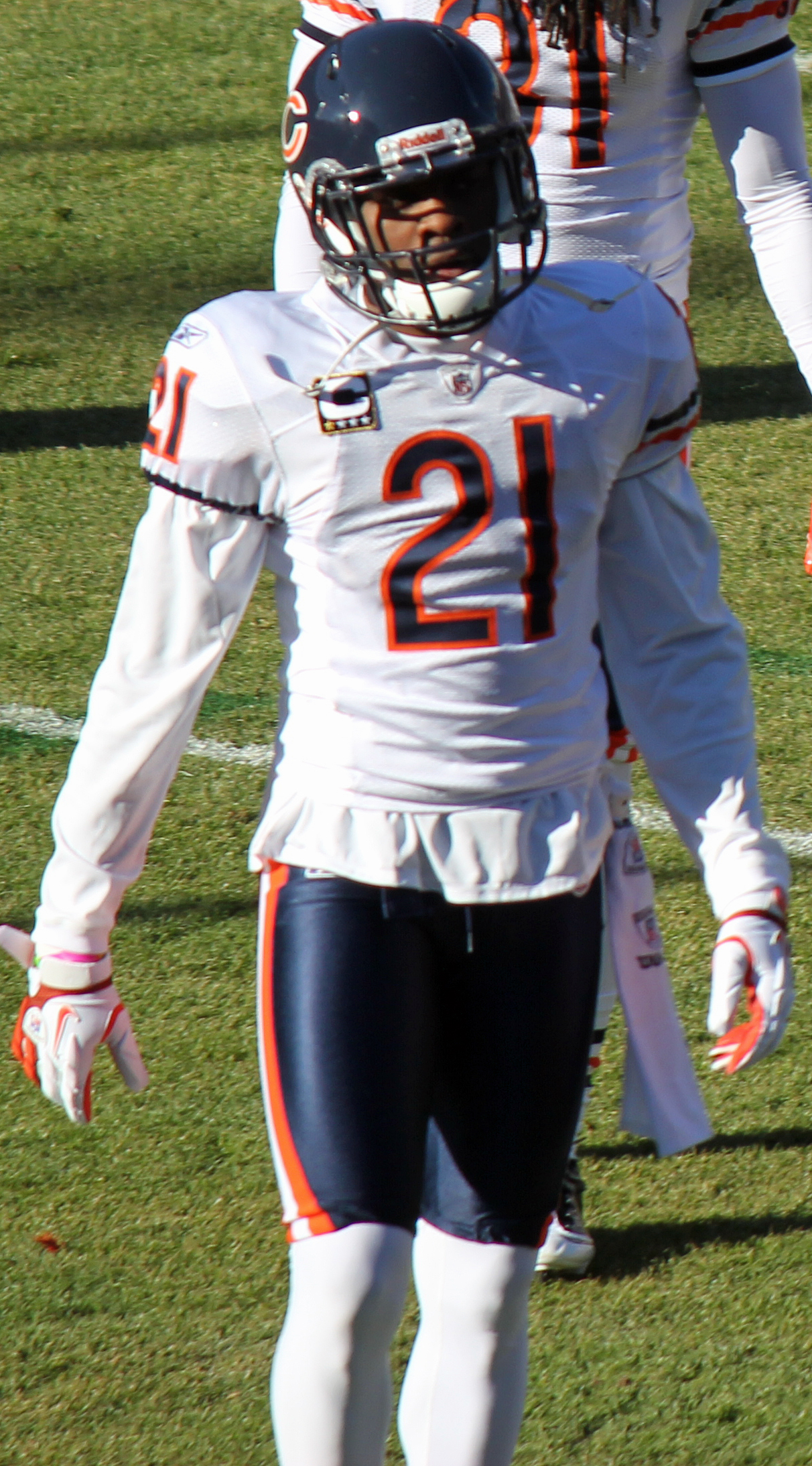
Corey Graham

- Jerry Azumah (b. 1977), former professional football player, Chicago Bears, 1998 Walter Payton Award winner (1999)
- David Ball (b. 1984), former professional Canadian football player for Hamilton Tiger-Cats and Winnipeg Blue Bombers; broke Division I-AA record for touchdown receptions previously held by Jerry Rice (2007)
- Étienne Boulay (b. 1983), Canadian Football League Grey Cup champion (2006)
- Dutch Connor (1895–1978), professional football player in the mid-1920s for the Providence Steamrollers and Brooklyn Lions (1921)
- Ryan Day (b. 1979), head coach of the Ohio State Buckeyes (2001)
- Pat Downey (b. 1974), former professional football player, Washington Redskins (1998)
- Phil Estes (b. 1958), football head coach, Brown University (1979)
- Corey Graham (b. 1985), professional football player, Philadelphia Eagles, formerly Buffalo Bills, Baltimore Ravens, Chicago Bears (2007)
- Bruce Huther (b. 1954), professional football player, Dallas Cowboys, 1978 Super Bowl champion (1976)
- Chad Kackert (b. 1986), professional Canadian Football League player, Toronto Argonauts, most valuable player in 100th Grey Cup game (2010)
- Chip Kelly (b. 1963), head coach, UCLA; former head football coach for NFL's San Francisco 49ers, Philadelphia Eagles and Oregon (1990)
- Dan Kreider (b. 1977), professional football player, Pittsburgh Steelers, 2006 Super Bowl champion (1999)
- Dylan Laube (b. 1999), professional football player for the Las Vegas Raiders
- George O'Leary (b. 1946), former head football coach for University of Central Florida (1968)
- Kamau Peterson (b. 1978), professional football player, Canadian football, Calgary Stampeders, Winnipeg Blue Bombers, Edmonton Eskimos (2000)
- Jared Smith (b. 1990), professional football player for Seattle Seahawks, Super Bowl winner over Denver Broncos in 2014 (2013)
- Cy Wentworth (1904–1986), professional football player in the late 1920s for the Providence Steamrollers and Boston Bulldogs (1924)
- Randal Williams (b. 1978), former professional football player, Jacksonville Jaguars, Dallas Cowboys and Oakland Raiders (2000)

=== Other sports ===
Basketball

- Dane DiLiegro, professional basketball player and actor (2007–2011)
- Jaleen Smith, basketball guard in the Israeli Basketball Premier League (2013–2017)

Baseball

- Del Bissonette (1899–1972), Major League Baseball player, Brooklyn Dodgers (attended)
- Carlton Fisk (b. 1947), Major League Baseball player, Boston Red Sox, Chicago White Sox; Baseball Hall of Fame inductee (attended)
- Rich Gale (b. 1954), MLB pitcher and coach; New Hampshire Athlete of the Century honorable mention

Cheerleading

- Driss Dallahi, National Football League cheerleader for the New England Patriots

Field hockey

- Barbara Marois (b. 1963), captain, US women's field hockey team

Track & field

- Elle Purrier St. Pierre (b. 1995), middle-distance runner, 11-time All-American

== Diplomacy, government, and politics ==
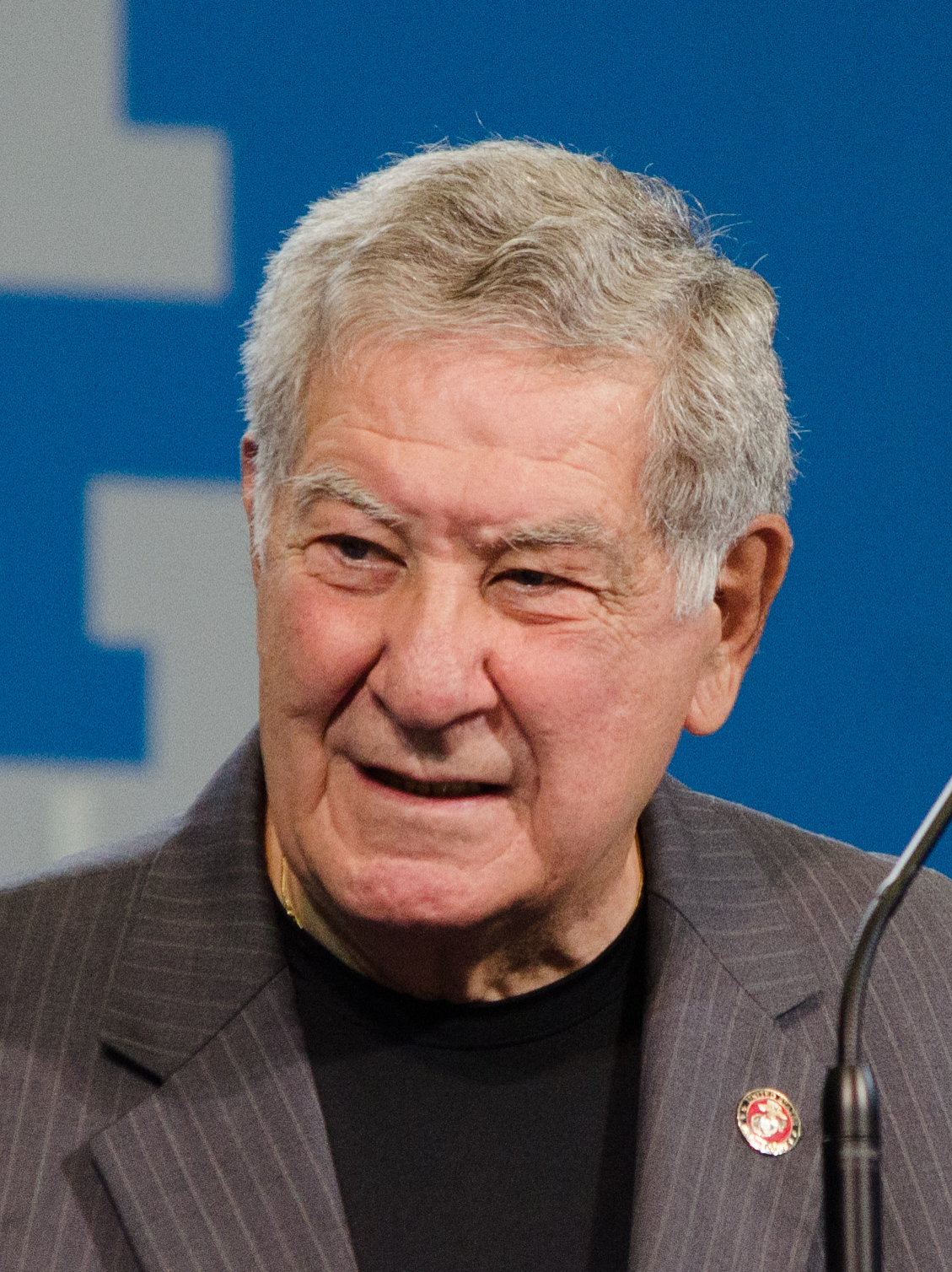
Lou D'Allesandro

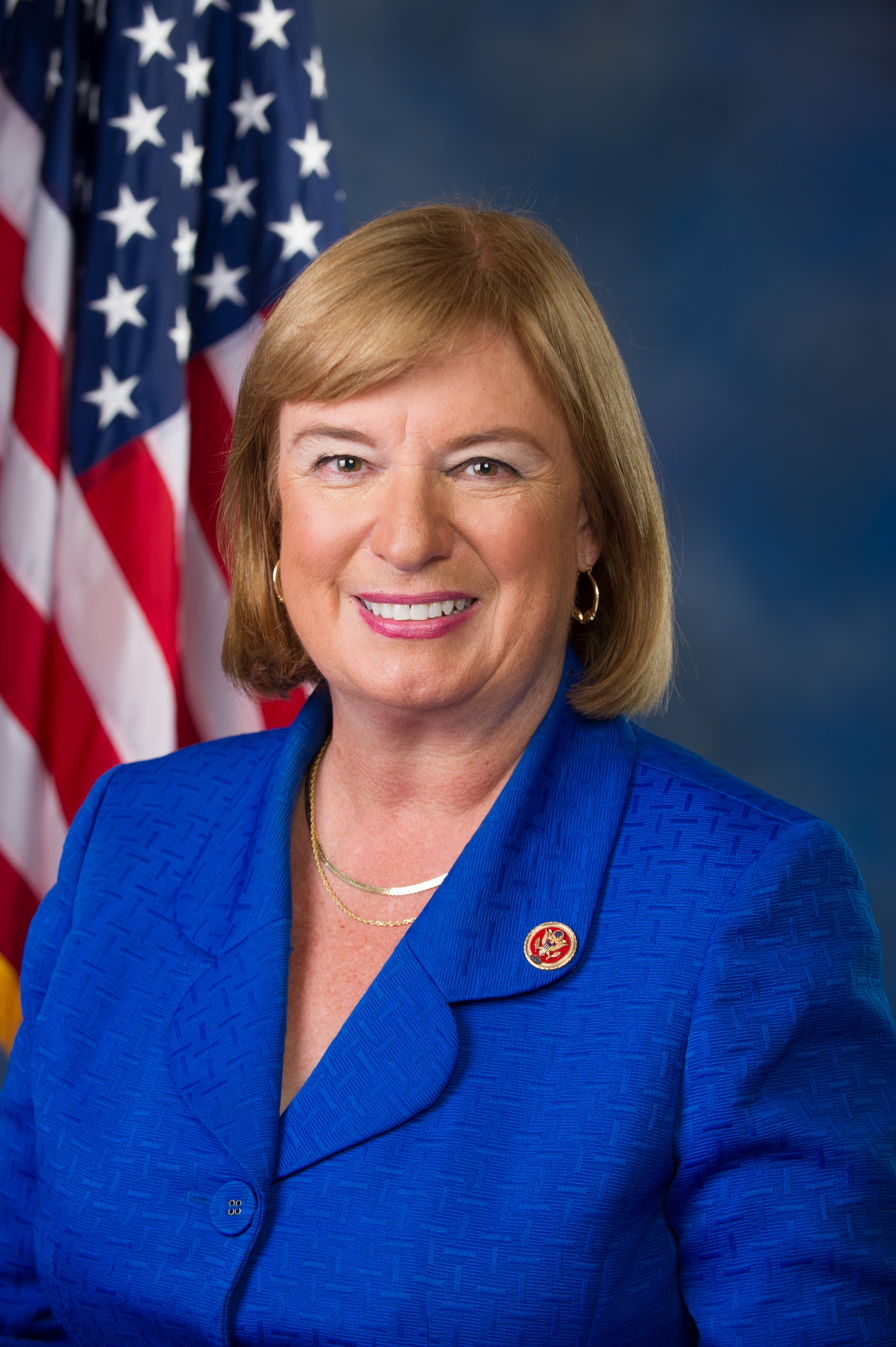
Carol Shea-Porter

- Eben Bartlett (1912–1983), member of the New Hampshire House of Representatives
- Robert Caret (b. 1947), Ph.D., president of Towson University
- Christie Carpino, member of the Connecticut House of Representatives
- Tansu Çiller (b. 1946), Turkish economist and politician, Turkey's first female prime minister (1993–96) and the first woman to head a Muslim country in the Middle East
- Lou D'Allesandro (b. 1938), member of the New Hampshire Senate; former athletic director and men's basketball coach at Southern New Hampshire University
- Jane Eberle, member of the Maine House of Representatives
- Laura Fortman (b. 1954), deputy administrator, Wage and Hour Division, United States Department of Labor, and former commissioner of the Maine Department of Labor
- Bill Gardner (b. 1948), New Hampshire Secretary of State, sets date of New Hampshire presidential primary
- Joann Ginal, member of the Colorado State House of Representatives
- Mary A. Legere, lieutenant general and deputy chief of staff for intelligence of the United States Army
- Steven Maviglio, political consultant
- Eoin McKiernan (1915–2004), early scholar in the field of Irish studies
- Ronald Noble (b. 1956), secretary general of Interpol (1979)
- Hajiji Noor (b. 1956), Malaysian politician, 16th and current Chief Minister of Sabah
- Kathleen Koehler Paige (b. 1948), rear admiral, retired, former senior engineering duty officer, US Navy (1970)
- Harl Pease (1917–1942), USAAF captain in World War II, posthumously awarded the Medal of Honor for his actions over Rabaul in the South Pacific in 1942; namesake of Pease Air Force Base (1939)
- Lori Robinson (c. 1959), U.S. Air Force general, first woman ever to head combatant command and now commander, Northern Command (1981)
- John Root (1937–2025), member of the New Hampshire House of Representatives
- Carol Shea-Porter (b. 1952), congresswoman (1974, '79G)
- Arthur C. Vailas (b. 1951), president of Idaho State University; former vice chancellor of the University of Houston System and vice president of the University of Houston (1973)
- Dawn Zimmer (b. 1968), mayor of Hoboken, New Jersey (1990)

=== Governors of New Hampshire ===
- John Lynch (b. 1952), former governor of New Hampshire (1974)
- Steve Merrill (1946–2020), former governor of New Hampshire (1969)
- Wesley Powell (1915–1981), former governor of New Hampshire

== Educators ==
- David Duquette, philosophy professor
- Elizabeth Virgil, B.S., first African-American to graduate from a four-year program at the University of New Hampshire, in 1926

== Science, business and industry ==
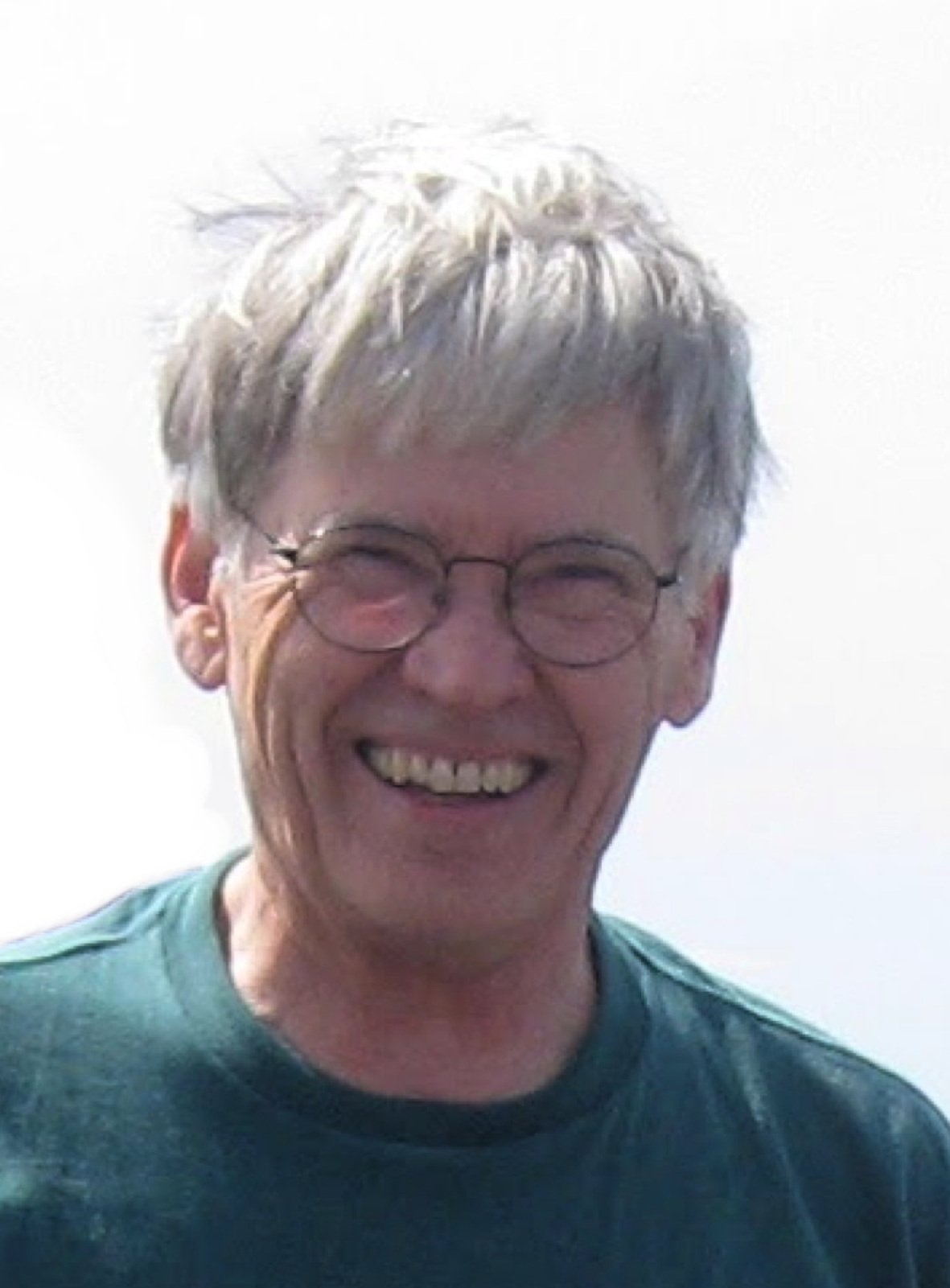
Peter K. Hepler

- Paul S. Anderson (b. 1938), Ph.D., vice president of chemistry (retired), Merck and former American Chemical Society president
- Robert V. Bruce (1923–2008), B.S. in mechanical engineering (1945), winner of the Pulitzer Prize for History
- David M. Cote (b. 1952), chairman and chief executive officer, Honeywell (1976)
- Anne Finucane (b. 1952), vice chair, Bank of America (1974)
- Peter K. Hepler (b. 1936), B.S. in chemistry (1958), plant biologist
- Richard M. Linnehan (b. 1957), astronaut, second veterinarian in space (1980)
- Lee Morin (b. 1952), astronaut (1974)
- Julie Palais (b. 1956), B.A. in geology/earth science (1978), Antarctic researcher, glaciologist
- Caitlin Rivers, B.S. in anthropology (2011), assistant professor at Johns Hopkins Bloomberg School of Public Health and Senior Scholar at the Johns Hopkins Center for Health Security
- Steve Salis, entrepreneur, co-founder of &pizza, and founder of Sizzle Acquisition
- James A. Thomson, B.S. in physics (1967), S.D. (2007), president and chief executive officer, RAND Corporation
- Richard Valle (1931–1995), former chairman and president of the Valle's Steak House chain of restaurants
