= Alexander Bershadsky =

Israeli-Russian scientist

Alexander D. Bershadsky
- Education: Moscow State University; Cancer Research Centre of the Russian Academy of Medical Sciences
- Known for: Cell motility, actin cytoskeleton dynamics, mechanobiology, cell adhesion, and mechanotransduction
- Scientific career
- Workplaces: Mechanobiology Institute, National University of Singapore; Weizmann Institute of Science
- Doctoral advisor: Juri Vasiliev
- Website: Official profile

Alexander D. Bershadsky (Hebrew: אלכסנדר ברשדסקי) is a Russian-Israeli cell biologist who studies the actin cytoskeleton and cell motility. His research has contributed to the understanding of cytoskeletal dynamics and mechanotransduction.

== Early life and education ==
Bershadsky was educated in Russia, graduating from Moscow State University. He earned his Ph.D. from the Cancer Research Centre of the Russian Academy of Medical Sciences under the supervision of Prof. Juri Vasiliev. In 1988, he co-authored Cytoskeleton with Vasiliev, a textbook that systematically addressed the structure and dynamics of the cytoskeleton.

== Career ==
After earning his doctorate, Bershadsky relocated to Israel in 1992 and joined the Weizmann Institute of Science, where he progressed from scientist to full professor. His career includes several visiting professorships at institutions such as the Curie Institute (Paris, France, 2005), the Marine Biological Laboratory (Woods Hole, Massachusetts, USA, 2007), and the National University of Singapore (Queenstown, Singapore, 2008–2010).

As of February 2025, he serves as a Senior Principal Research Scientist at the Mechanobiology Institute at the National University of Singapore is a Professor at the Weizmann Institute. Also as of February 2025, Bershadsky serves on the editorial board of the international journal Cytoskeleton (formerly known as Cell Motility and the Cytoskeleton).

== Research and contributions ==
Cell motility and mechanotransduction: Bershadsky's work explores how cells use mechanical forces to regulate adhesion, migration, and intracellular trafficking. He demonstrated that focal adhesions function as mechanosensors, converting mechanical stimuli into biochemical signals.

Cytoskeletal dynamics: Bershadsky's studies have advanced the understanding of actin filament assembly and organization. In particular, his research on the role of formins in actin polymerization and the interplay between actin and microtubules has provided insights into cell morphology and movement.

Mechanosensitivity and adhesion complexes: Bershadsky's research has shown that the physical forces generated by, or acting upon, a cell can affect the formation and regulation of adhesion complexes. These forces, in turn, affect key cellular processes such as migration, polarization, and tissue organization.

Advanced imaging techniques: Bershadsky's laboratory employs advanced microscopy methods, including structured illumination microscopy (SIM), to capture dynamic processes in cells in real time. These techniques have improved visualization of cytoskeletal organization and focal adhesion dynamics.

In May 2018, a 2003 paper co-authored by Bershadsky in the Journal of Biological Chemistry was officially withdrawn by the authors.

== Personal life ==
Alexander D. Bershadsky is married to Svetlana Greenberg, and they have a daughter named Natasha Bershadsky, along with two grandchildren.

== Selected publications ==
- Aureille J, Prabhu SS, Barnett SF, et al. (2024). "Focal adhesions are controlled by microtubules through local contractility regulation". The EMBO Journal, 43 (13).
- Rafiq NM, Nishimura Y, Plotnikov SV, et al. (2019). "A mechano-signalling network linking microtubules, myosin IIA filaments and integrin-based adhesions". Nature Materials, 18 (6).
- Hu S, Dasbiswas K, Guo Z, et al. (2017). "Long-range self-organization of cytoskeletal myosin II filament stacks". Nature Cell Biology, 19 (2).
- Tee YH, Shemesh T, Thiagarajan V, et al. (2015) "Cellular chirality arising from the self-organization of the actin cytoskeleton". Nature Cell Biology, 17 (4).
- Prager-Khoutorsky M, Lichtenstein A, Krishnan R, et al. (2011). "Fibroblast polarization is a matrix-rigidity-dependent process controlled by focal adhesion mechanosensing". Nature Cell Biology, 13 (12).
- Riveline D, Zamir E, Balaban NQ, et al. (2001). "Focal contacts as mechanosensors: externally applied local mechanical force induces growth of focal contacts by an mDia1-dependent and ROCK-independent mechanism". Journal of Cell Biology, 153 (6).
