= Hepler (surname) =

Hepler is a surname of German origin. Notable people with the surname include:

- Allison Hepler, American politician
- Ann-Marie Hepler (born 1996), Marshallese swimmer
- Bill Hepler (born 1945), American baseball player
- James Hepler (born 1973), American musician
- Jennifer Hepler, video game developer, author and scriptwriter
- Peter K. Hepler (born 1936), American professor and biologist

== See also ==
- Hepler, Kansas
- Jesse Hepler Lilac Arboretum
- Hepler Unit
