= John Root =

John Root may refer to:

- John Root (19th c.), Swedish immigrant to Louisiana who killed Eric Jansson (died 1850)
- John Root (19th–20th c.), American baseball player who played in the Missouri Valley League
- John B. Root (born 1958, as Jean Guilloré), French porn director
- John Henry Haines Root (1908–1991), Canadian politician
- John Wellborn Root (1850–1891), American architect
- John Wellborn Root Jr. (1887–1963), his son, American architect
- Jack Root (John Arthur Root, 1876–1963), Hungarian-born American boxer and first light heavyweight champion
- John Root (politician) (1937–2025), American politician

== See also ==
- William John Root (born 1959), Canadian ice hockey player
