= Dover High School (New Hampshire) =

Coordinates: 43°10′34″N 70°53′07″W

Dover Senior High School

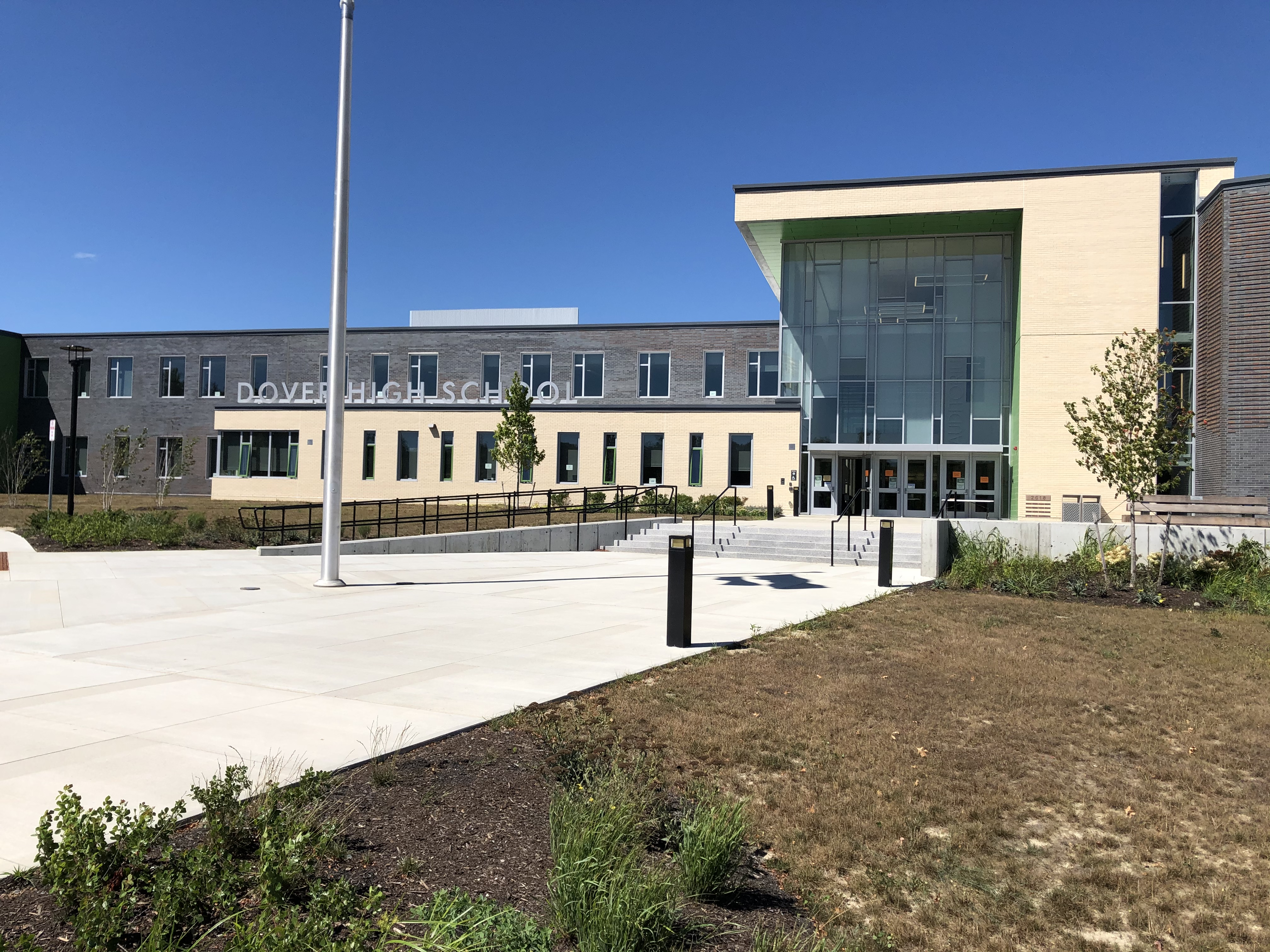
- The current high school building (August 2020)

Location
- 25 Alumni Dr. Dover, NH; United States

Information
- Type: Public
- Motto: "Nothing stops a wave!"
- Founded: 1851; 175 years ago
- CEEB code: 300135
- Principal: Peter Driscoll
- Teaching staff: 108.10 (FTE)
- Grades: High school (9-12)
- Enrollment: 1,371 (2024-2025)
- Student to teacher ratio: 12.68
- Campus: Suburban
- Colors: Green and White
- Mascot: The Green Wave
- Newspaper: The Tide
- Website: dhs.sau11.nh.gov

Dover Senior High School, known colloquially as Dover High School (DHS), or Dover High School and Career Technical Center (DHS and CTC), serves the city of Dover and the towns of Barrington and Nottingham, New Hampshire. It serves roughly 1,300 students with general education and vocational education programs as part of the Dover School District. Linked by a road to Dover Middle School, the campus borders the Bellamy River. An alternative school is located across the road from the school, whose students are typically allowed to attend classes at both schools.

== History ==
The original location of Dover High School in 1851 was on Chestnut Street and served students north of the Cocheco River until 1869, when the Dover school system was consolidated. Dover High School's second iteration was designed by Alvah T. Ramsdell in 1905 and constructed adjacent to the Dover Public Library on Locust Street. In 1928, it was expanded to accommodate more students. This addition was largely to support mechanical and manual arts programs.

Iconic arched entrance to the 1967 school building

From 1967 to 2000, this building served as Dover Junior High School after the completion of Dover High School's third campus. The building still serves the Dover community as the McConnell Center. The next Dover High School building was built in 1967 along with a Regional Career Technical Center on Durham Road. The CTC continued DHS' tradition of creating trade school options for students. In 2005, DHS became a New Hampshire School of Excellence. In July 2016, construction began on a $87 million project to build a new high school and career technical campus adjacent to the existing complex, which was built over 50 years prior.

The 302,000-square-foot (28,100 m^{2}) building features:

- 80 classrooms
- 19 Career Technical Center programs
- 8,500-square-foot (790 m^{2}) auditorium
- 850 seats in the auditorium
- ¼-mile length of one lap around one floor of the school

In March 2019, teachers at DHS but many others in the Dover School District wore red and refused to be in the school until their contracted time. 90% of Dover teachers work beyond their contracted time. Teachers also raised the issue of student spending. In 2017–2018, Dover's spending per-pupil was $12,234, lower than the state average of $15,865, the second lowest in New Hampshire. The walkout was part of the 2018–19 education workers' strikes in the United States, though the teachers' union was able to agree to a contract before a strike could occur.

=== Racism controversy ===
In December 2018, a cell phone video surfaced on social media of two students singing a song to the tune of Jingle Bells with the lyrics changed to refer to the Ku Klux Klan. Among other changes, the refrain "Jingle Bells, Jingle Bells, Jingle all the way" was replaced with "KKK, KKK, Let's kill all the blacks", in a reference to Lynching. The video went viral, and was covered on national news, including The Boston Globe and The New York Times. The students were assigned by their US History teacher to rewrite a Christmas carol to be about Reconstruction. The students did not know they were being recorded. In a letter, Superintendent William Harbron described the event as "an incident of extreme racial insensitivity" and announced that the teacher was put on paid leave. Administrators announced a program called DREAM to advocate for diversity and community. The teacher was allowed to return to the classroom the following year after receiving training, which sparked protests from the NAACP, citing the fact that the teacher had never publicly apologized for the incident.

== Academics ==
Of the 308 graduates in the class of 2014, 50% went on to a four-year college and 24% went on to a two-year college, while 22% proceeded directly to employment and 4% joined the military. The mean SAT scores for this class were 510 in critical reading, 513 in math, and 492 in writing.

The academic day is split into four class blocks, along with a 40-minute "flex block" which students can tailor to their needs. The calendar alternates between "Green" and "White" days (like the school colors), and students follow different schedules based on which color day it is. DHS offers a few AP classes, which meet every day, including AP Calculus, AP Computer Science, AP English Literature and Composition, AP English Language and Composition, AP Latin, AP Art and Design, and AP Biology.

== Extra-curricular activities ==
=== Athletics ===
Dover High fields 29 varsity sports teams in boys and girls competition in the New Hampshire Interscholastic Athletic Association Division I, including Cross country, Cheerleading, Volleyball, Football, Field hockey, Golf, Soccer, Track and field, Ice hockey, Swimming, Alpine skiing, Gymnastics, Bowling, Basketball, Lacrosse, Softball, Baseball, Tennis, and Volleyball. Additionally, the school has a Unified program in Soccer, Basketball, and Volleyball. The hockey team competes in Division II, holding a record number of state championships. The Unified Volleyball team has recently enjoyed great success, winning the 2018 State Championship. In 2018, the Boys Tennis program made the state tournament for the first time in 14 years.

=== Music ===
The music program at Dover High is one of the most well-supported in the state, receiving entirely new facilities with the new building. Students can participate in the jazz, concert, pit, and marching bands. A jazz combo is also available. For vocalists, there is a chamber music group called the Soundwaves, along with a regular choir class. The Soundwaves, Jazz Band, and Jazz Combo perform at the Clark Terry Jazz Festival at the University of New Hampshire.

=== Clubs ===
The official student-run newspaper of the Dover High School community is The Tide, founded in 2006. DHS currently has one notable FIRST Robotics Competition team, called Shockwave. Shockwave has earned the engineering inspiration award at competition, and is noted for its success and community involvement. The Foreign Language program offers Latin, Spanish, and French clubs. The Latin club competes regionally in Certamen and is a member of the National Junior Classical League. The Art Club hosts an annual Film festival. Other offerings include a World Culture (formerly Asian Culture) club, gaming club, and Earth Action club.

== Sister school ==
The school is linked to Sandbach School in the UK.

== Notable alumni ==
- Matt Chandler (writer), children's book author
- Peter K. Hepler, plant biologist
- Joseph C. McConnell, top-scoring American jet fighter ace during the Korean War; awarded the Distinguished Service Cross and the Silver Star
- Cathy Schiro O'Brien, an Olympian and record holder of the US women's high school marathon time at 2:34:24. She also won the women's Los Angeles Marathon in 1991.
- Jenny Thompson, whose twelve Olympic swimming medals makes her one of the most decorated Olympic athletes of all time
- Michael Weeden, second youngest member in New Hampshire history to serve in the New Hampshire House of Representatives
- Jillian York, writer and activist
