= Roger M. Spanswick =

Professor of Biological and Environmental Engineering

Roger Morgan Spanswick
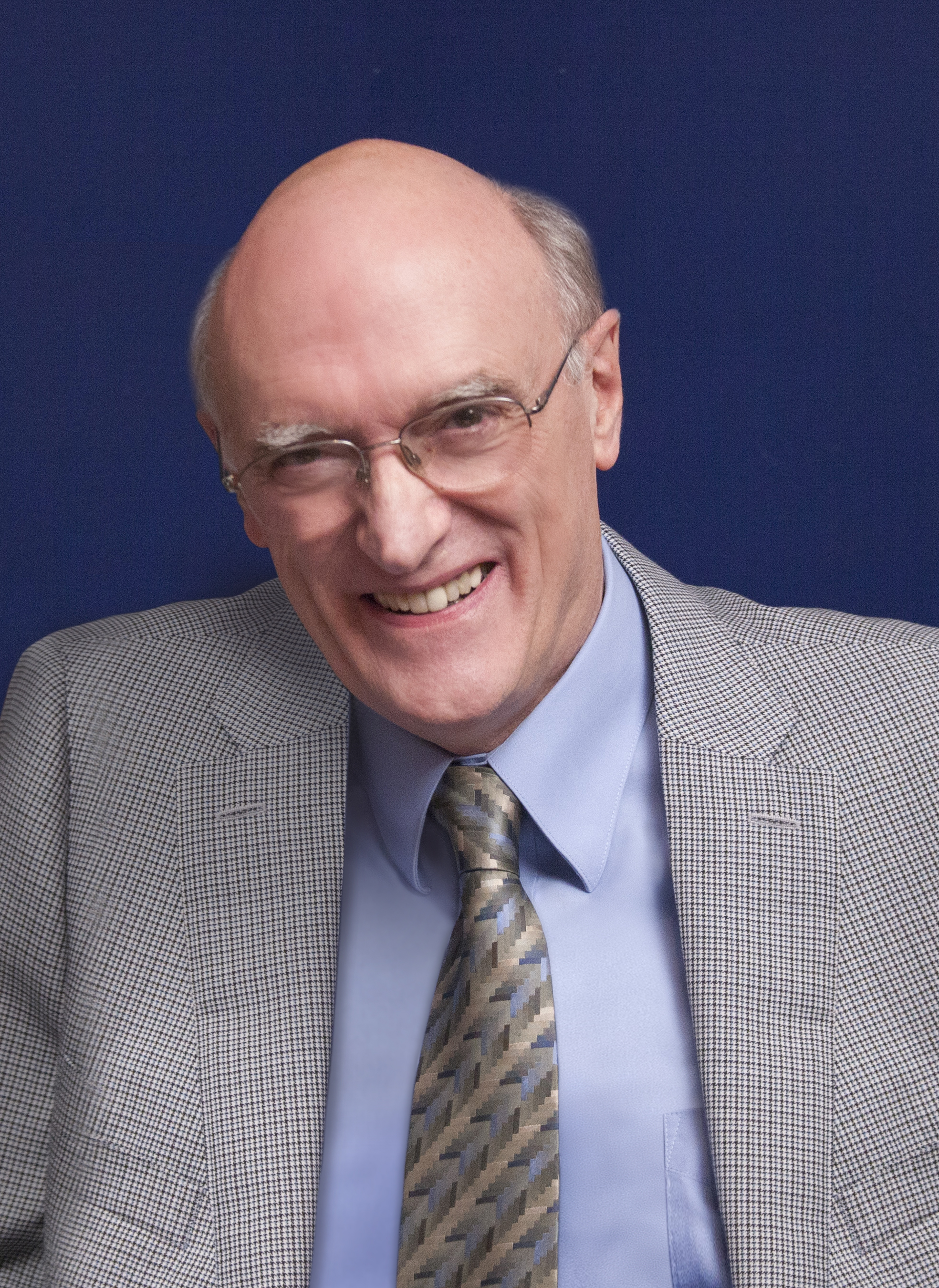
- Born: June 24, 1939; Barford St. John and St. Michael, Oxfordshire, England
- Died: February 12, 2014 (aged 74); New York, U.S.
- Citizenship: United States
- Education: Birmingham University, Physics, 1960; University of Edinburgh, Ph.D. Biophysics, 1964; University of Cambridge, Post Doc.
- Known for: Ion Transport and Plant Membrane Biology
- Scientific career
- Fields: Biophysics, Plant physiology, Metabolic engineering

Roger Morgan Spanswick (June 24, 1939 – February 12, 2014) was a Professor of Biological and Environmental Engineering at Cornell University and an important figure in the history of plant membrane biology.

== Early life and education ==
Spanswick was born on June 24, 1939, in Barford St. John and St. Michael, Oxfordshire, England, the son of Lucy and Arthur Spanswick.

In 1960, he graduated from the University of Birmingham with an honours degree in physics. He received a Diploma in Biophysics and then a Ph.D. in Biophysics with E. J. Williams at the Department of Biophysics in the University of Edinburgh in 1964. Spanswick then moved to the University of Cambridge, where he was Enid MacRobbie’s first post-doctorate student. MacRobbie said that, "Roger played a huge part in the development of the Plant Biophysics group, and his legacy and legend lasted for years. It was one of the best and most stimulating periods in my group, and Roger played a key role in this."

== Career ==
Spanswick joined the plant physiology group at Cornell University that included André Jagendorf, Peter J. Davies, and others. Roger became an assistant professor of plant physiology in 1967, an associate professor in 1973, and a full professor in 1979. Roger Spanswick was a Guggenheim Fellow in 1980-81 and made a Fellow of the American Association for the Advancement of Science (AAAS) and the World Innovation Foundation in 2004. He was an active member of the Friday Lunch Club, which included A. Carl Leopold, Randy Wayne, and others. Spanswick's unfunded grant proposals and his personal collection of materials concerning the history of the Genomics Initiative are available in the Cornell University Archives, as collection number #21-51-4251.

=== Research ===
Spanswick's highly cited research focused on various aspects of ion transport. He proved the presence of an electrogenic ion pump in plant cells. Subsequent biochemical work led to the identification of proton transport ATPases at the plasma membrane and vacuolar membranes. Along with Christopher Faraday, he discovered a membrane skeleton in plants.

Enid MacRobbie characterized Roger Spanswick’s scientific legacy as follows: "Roger made major contributions to our understanding of basic ion transport processes in plants, and was a true pioneer. He was both a very original thinker and a very versatile, thorough and careful experimentalist. He initiated a revolution in our understanding of ion transport in plant cells. His demonstration (in 1972) that the most important transport system in the plasmalemma of Characean cells is a proton-pumping ATPase, generating membrane potentials well negative of the potassium equilibrium potential, was a major advance… Previously plant physiologists had assumed that plant cells were like animal cells, with an ATP-dependent sodium-potassium exchange pump as the major process of active ion transport. There was opposition to this new view, but by the time of his review in the 1981 Annual Review of Plant Physiology further experimental work made it clear that he was right.

In the 970s and 1980s, he showed that two distinct proton pumping ATPases were present in plasmalemma and tonoplast, with different inhibitor characteristics. He also showed that the gradients of pH and membrane potential generated by the primary proton pump in the plasmalemma could be used to drive secondary active transport of other solutes, sugars, amino acids and other ions. Thus his original idea led to a very large volume of experimental work, in which he also had a major input, and the consequence was a revolution in the field. He later went on to work successfully on more applied problems over a wide range of topics, but it is important to recognize the lasting legacy of his work in the field of basic ion transport."

Spanswick pioneered the use of electrophysiological methods to investigate intercellular transport through plasmodesmata.

== Personal life ==
Roger married Helen Walker in 1963. Andrew Spanswick and Robert Spanswick are their sons.

== Death ==
Spanswick died at his hillside home overlooking Cayuga Lake on February 12, 2014. He is interred in Pleasant Grove Cemetery in Ithaca, New York, where his gravestone is inscribed with the phrase "only connect" from the 1910 book Howards End by E. M. Forster.

== Books ==
- Spanswick, R. M., W. J. Lucas, and J. Dainty, eds. Plant Membrane Transport: Current Conceptual Issues: proceedings of the international workshop held in Toronto, Canada, July 22–27, 1979 Elsevier/North-Holland Biomedical Press, Amsterdam
