= Dover School District =

Dover School District may refer to:

- Dover School District (New Hampshire) in Dover, New Hampshire
- Dover School District (New Jersey) in Dover, New Jersey
- Dover Area School District in Dover Township, Pennsylvania

== See also ==
- Kitzmiller v. Dover Area School District, a 2005 court case
