= Randy Wayne (biologist) =

American plant biologist

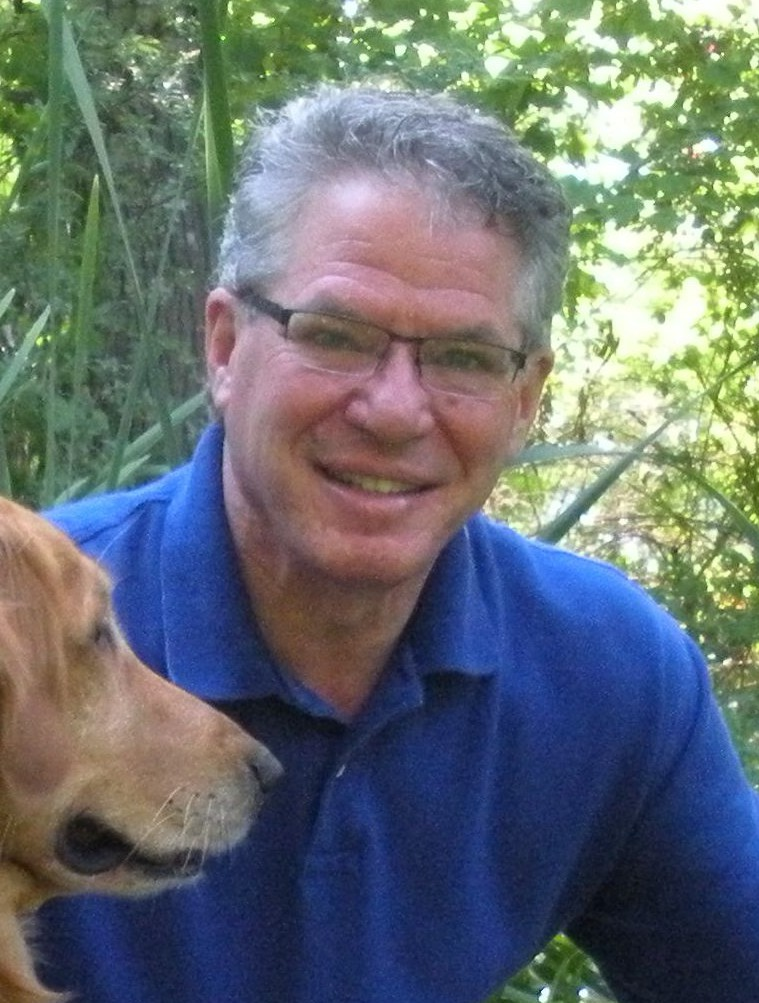
- Born: May 8, 1955 (age 71); Boston, Massachusetts United States
- Education: University of Massachusetts Amherst BS 1977; University of California at Los Angeles Masters 1979; University of Massachusetts Amherst PhD 1985
- Scientific career
- Fields: Biophysical Plant Cell Biology
- Workplaces: Cornell
- Doctoral advisor: Peter K. Hepler
- Website: Randy Wayne at Cornell

Randy O. Wayne is an associate professor of plant biology at Cornell University. Along with his former colleague Peter K. Hepler, Wayne established the role of calcium in regulating plant growth. They researched how plant cells sense gravity through pressure, the water permeability of plant membranes, light microscopy, as well as the effects of calcium on plant development. Wayne authored two textbooks, including Plant Cell Biology: From Astronomy to Zoology and Light and Video Microscopy.

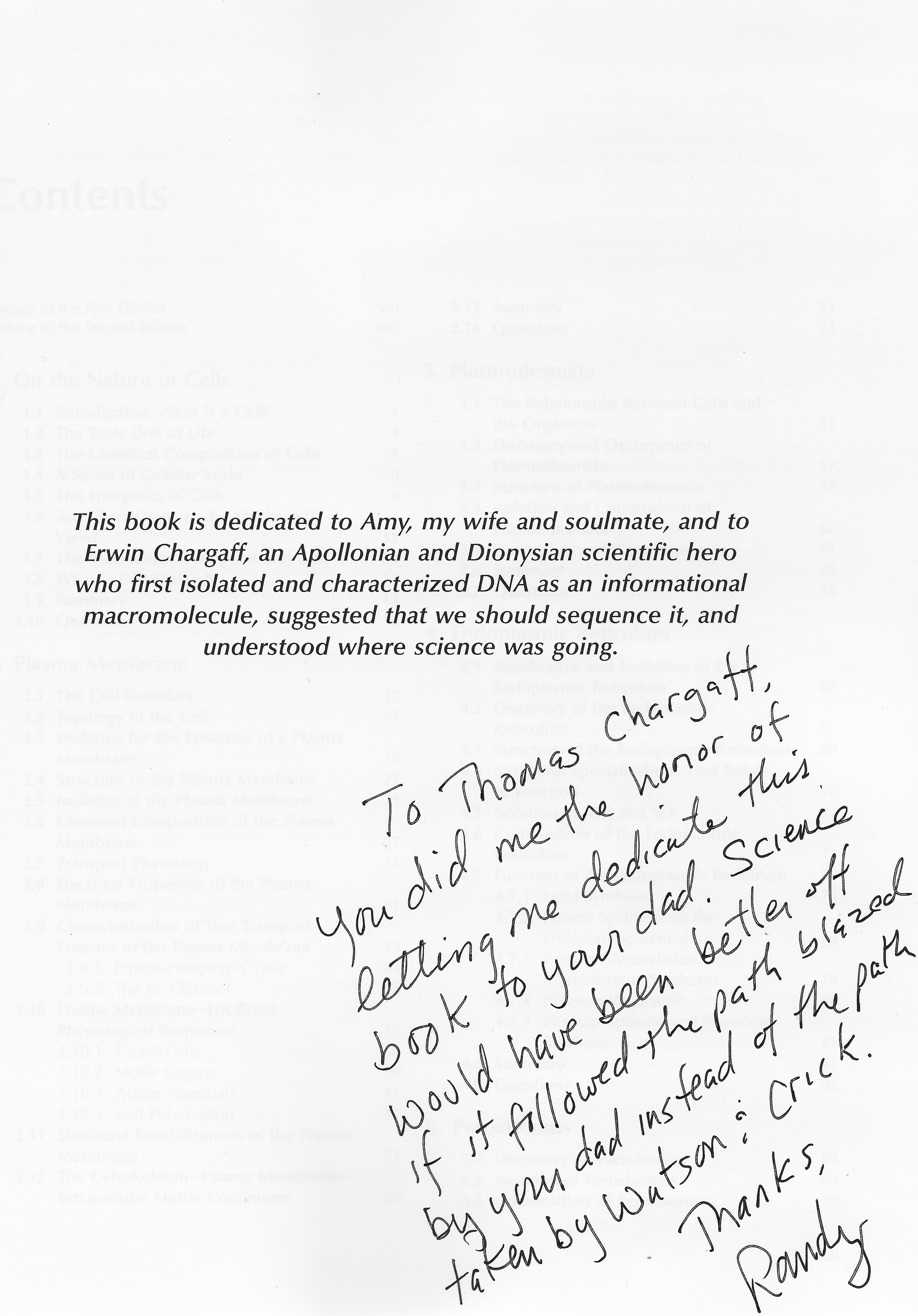
Copy of Dedication page to Plant Cell Biology sent to Thomas Chargaff, son of Erwin Chargaff

Attempting to explain photosynthesis and gravitropism, Wayne has developed and promoted a fringe theory of light and gravity based on a concept of "binary photons". This concept is inconsistent with relativity and modern physics as a whole.

== Education ==
Wayne completed his undergraduate studies in botany at the University of Massachusetts. He earned an M.A. in biology from the University of California at Los Angeles, and a Ph.D. in Plant Cell Biology from the University of Massachusetts in 1985 working under Peter K. Hepler. He was a post-doc at The University of Texas at Austin working with Stanley Roux, Guy Thompson, and H. Y. Lim Tung, and had a Japanese Society for the Promotion of Science Fellowship to work with Masashi Tazawa at the University of Tokyo. While in Japan, Wayne worked at the National Institute of Basic Biology in Okazaki with Akeo Kadota, Masakatsu Watanabe, and Masaki Furuya, Hitotsubashi University in Kunitachi with Eiji Kamitsubo, and the Himeji Institute of Technology with Tetsuro Mimura and Teruo Shimmen.

== Career ==
Wayne joined the faculty at Cornell University in 1987. He is a member of the CALS School of Integrative Plant Science. He has a deep interest in teaching science and teaches Plant Cell Biology and Light and Video Microscopy. He has taught a course for nonmajors entitled, Biological Principles and subsequently taught a course for nonmajors entitled, Light and Life. Wayne also has strong views on the meaning of a college education. Wayne is a member of the Biology and Society major, which is designed for students who wish to combine training in biology with perspectives from the social sciences and humanities to understand the scientific, social, political, and ethical aspects of modern biology.

=== Fern spore germination ===
When it was generally assumed that fern spores contained all the ions necessary for germination, Wayne, working with Peter K. Hepler, showed that external calcium ions were necessary for the red light-stimulated, phytochrome-mediated signal transduction chain that leads to the germination response of the spores of Onoclea sensibilis.

=== Water permeability of plant cell membranes ===
It was generally considered that water moved in and out of the plant cell through the lipid bilayer. Wayne, working with Masashi Tazawa, presented most of the now classical arguments favoring membrane water channels and clearly demonstrated their major contribution to osmotic water transport. Wayne's work preceded the molecular identification of aquaporins in plant cells.

=== Gravity sensing in plant cells ===
It is generally believed that the sedimentation of starch-containing plastids, known as amyloplasts, is responsible for gravity-sensing in plant cells. However, based on the facts that plant cells that do not contain sedimenting amyloplasts still sense gravity and that starchless mutants in higher plants are almost as sensitive to gravity as the wild-type plants, Wayne, working with Mark P. Staves and A. Carl Leopold proposed that the amyloplasts do not act as gravity sensors, but as a ballast to enhance the gravitational pressure sensed by proteins at the plasma membrane–extracellular matrix junction.

== Books ==
- Plant Cell Biology: From Astronomy to Zoology, 2009, Elsevier/Academic Press. (ISBN 9780123742339)
- Plant Cell Biology: From Astronomy to Zoology, Second Edition, 2019, Elsevier/Academic Press. (ISBN 9780128143711)
- Light and Video Microscopy, 2009, Elsevier/Academic Press. (ISBN 9780080921280)
- Light and Video Microscopy, Second Edition, 2014, Elsevier/Academic Press. (ISBN 9780124114845)
- Light and Video Microscopy, Third Edition, 2019, Elsevier/Academic Press. (ISBN 9780128165010)

== Podcasts ==
- Mann Library Book Talk Plant Cell Biology: From Astronomy to Zoology
- Mann Library Book Talk Light and Video Microscopy
