= Mary Ann Esposito =

American chef (born 1943)

- Born: August 3, 1942 (age 84); Buffalo, New York, U.S.
- Education: University of New Hampshire and Daemen College
- Occupations: Chef, television personality and writer
- Known for: Host of Ciao Italia with Mary Ann Esposito television series

Mary Ann Esposito (born August 3, 1942) is an American chef, cookbook writer (having published over a dozen cookbooks), and the television host of Ciao Italia with Mary Ann Esposito, which started in 1989 and is the longest-running television cooking program in America.

== Personal life ==
Born Mary Ann Saporito (“saporito” is coincidentally the Italian word for “tasty”), she was raised in Buffalo, New York. Her mother was a dietitian. Her grandmothers, both professional chefs, moved to the United States from Italy in the 1890s. Her paternal grandmother, from Sicily, owned a butcher shop in Fairport, New York, and her maternal grandmother lived in Buffalo, where she owned a boarding house. The latter grandmother was from Naples, and continued the traditions of her Italian household within the boarding house. The boarding house was the only house in the neighborhood that had a bathtub, and on Friday nights she would offer neighbors a bath and dinner for a quarter. While her grandmothers provided traditional Italian food, Esposito desired to eat standard foods like other children: Wonder Bread and iceberg lettuce.

Esposito, who never intended to pursue a career in cooking, learned to cook from her family. Her grandmothers made bread every day, with Esposito helping to make upwards of 20 loaves of bread a day, canning vegetables and fruits, and helping to prepare ingredients for meals. Eventually, Esposito attended college, where she would graduate with a teaching degree and become an elementary school teacher.

In 1979, her mother sent her a pasta maker, and despite a lack of interest in cooking as an adult, Esposito taught herself how to make pasta dough. The following year, she and her husband Guy visited Italy for the first time, visiting his cousins. While in Italy, Esposito started attending a cooking class. She began learning the history of Italian cooking, region by region, and traveling to the country twice a year for cooking lessons. At the University of New Hampshire she took classes to learn how to speak Italian. By 1985, she had joined the history master's program at the university, writing her thesis about Italian Renaissance cooking.

== Career ==
Esposito started teaching cooking through the University of New Hampshire's Division of Continuing Education. In the mid-1980s, she submitted a proposal for a cooking show to New Hampshire Public Television. The show was delayed production because of the small size of the television station; however, upon moving to a larger station, a pilot was taped. The pilot was a test to not only gauge viewer reception, but, to also see how Esposito would be on camera. On the hottest day of the year in the region, the television crew came to Esposito's home in Durham, New Hampshire, and the pilot was taped. Upon airing, the pilot received great reception and the longest-running television cooking show was born.

Esposito has published over a dozen cooking books about Italian cooking and entertaining. Her 1997 book, What You Knead, about breadmaking, was awarded best in category by the International Cookbook Revue and was named one of Food & Wine magazine's top cookbooks of 1997. She makes over forty public appearances a year nationally and has appeared on the Today Show, Regis and Kathie Lee, QVC, the Food Network, Martha Stewart Living Radio, and other programs. She contributed to The Huffington Post and New Hampshire Home.

=== Ciao Italia with Mary Ann Esposito ===
Ciao Italia with Mary Ann Esposito, is a thirty-minute cooking show produced for PBS by Esposito's own Mary Esposito Productions, and taped at New Hampshire Public Television. The show features Esposito's recipes and cooking tips, and visits from guest chefs. She also explores the history of Italian cooking and food. Through the show, Esposito seeks to help her viewers learn about new recipes that are "doable, authentic, and good."

When deciding what to feature on the show, Esposito has four standards: she must like to eat the food, the ingredients should be easy to find, the recipe should be something unique and new to the viewer, and should be manageable by the kitchen staff. Every episode has twenty volunteers who work on the show. An entire season of shows, generally about thirty-two episodes, can be taped within two weeks during the summer, with two to three shows being taped a day.

All of the food is made from scratch in the studio, with each dish being prepared in numerous batches and at different recipe stages. This allows Esposito to execute an entire recipe in a matter of minutes that might take hours to complete. All of the recipes are planned by Esposito and the kitchen staff. Volunteers gather all the pertinent ingredients from local markets and go to Boston for specialty foods if unavailable locally.

Recipes are prepared the day of the show. Ciao Italia is not scripted. The studio set is loosely based on Esposito's home kitchen. The view out the window of the set is painted to appear as the view of the Oyster River, which is seen from her home kitchen. To prepare for shows, Esposito researches and tests recipes outside the studio.

=== Restaurant ===
In 2020, Esposito opened a restaurant, also named "Ciao Italia". She stated, "I've been asked to do a Ciao Italia restaurant many times over the years, and I've always said no," but agreed to open one in her longtime hometown of Durham. Ownership and business model quickly pivoted, the very next year, 2021, to a wine bar owned by the Clark Family. Esposito is no longer mentioned on the website.

== Recognitions ==
A scholarship foundation named after and maintained by Esposito awards scholarships for students seeking financial aid to study culinary arts. Esposito was awarded an honorary degree from St. Anselm College. She has received the Lifetime Achievement Award in the Culinary and Cultural Arts of Italy by the Order Sons of Italy in America. She is in the Hall of Fame for the Italian Trade Commission.

On June 2, 2013, a knighthood was bestowed upon her by the President of the Italian Republic under the title Cavaliere dell'Ordine della Stella d'Italia (Knight of the Order of the Star of Italy). She was one of 160 people worldwide to receive this honor in 2013, and the only American.

Esposito was honored in 2004 with the Advancement in Career award by her alma mater Daemen College.

== Publications ==
- Plant, Harvest, Cook!: Ciao Italia. Peter E. Randall Publisher: New Hampshire (2022). ISBN 978-1-942155-48-5
- My Lifelong Food Adventures in Italy: Ciao Italia Peter E. Randall Publisher: New Hampshire (2018). ISBN 978-1-942155-17-1
- Celebrations Italian Style: Recipes and Menus for Special Occasions and Seasons of the Year. Hearst Books: New York (1995). ISBN 0-688-13038-0. Morrow Cookbooks: New York (1991). ISBN 0-688-10317-0.
- Bringing Italy Home. ISBN 0-312-28058-0.
- Family Classics: More than 200 Treasured Recipes from 3 Generations of Italian Cooks. St. Martin's Press: New York (2011). ISBN 0-312-57121-6.
- Five-Ingredient Favorites: Quick and Delicious Recipes from an Italian Kitchen. St. Martin's Press: New York (2009). ISBN 0-312-37769-X.
- Tuscany: Traditional Recipes from One of Italy's Most Famous Regions. St. Martin's Press: New York (2003). ISBN 0-312-32174-0.
- Umbria: Recipes and Reflections from the Heart of Italy. St. Martin's Press: New York (2002). ISBN 0-312-30329-7.
- CPronto!: 30-Minute Recipes from an Italian Kitchen. St. Martin's Press: New York (2005). ISBN 0-312-33908-9.
- Slow and Easy: Casseroles, Braises, Lasagne, and Stews from an Italian Kitchen. St. Martin's Press: New York (2007). ISBN 0-312-36292-7.
- Mangia Pasta!: Easy-To-Make Recipes for Company and Every Day. Morrow Cookbooks: New York (1998). ISBN 0-688-16189-8.
- Nella Cucina: More Italian Cooking from the Host of Cucina Italiana. Morrow Cookbooks: New York (1993). ISBN 0-688-12151-9.
- What You Knead. Morrow Cookbooks: New York (1997). ISBN 0-688-15010-1.

== See also ==
- List of chefs
- List of Italian Americans
- List of people from Buffalo, New York
- List of people from New Hampshire
- List of University of New Hampshire alumni
- Lists of writers
