= Thor Griffith =

American football player (born 2002)

Profile
- Position: Defensive tackle

Personal information
- Born: Portsmouth, New Hampshire, U.S.
- Listed height: 6 ft 2 in (1.88 m)
- Listed weight: 305 lb (138 kg)

Career information
- High school: Portsmouth
- College: Harvard (2021–2023); Louisville (2024)
- NFL draft: 2025: undrafted

Career history
- Seattle Seahawks (2025)*; Saskatchewan Roughriders (2026)*
- * Offseason or practice squad member only

Awards and highlights
- First-team FCS All-American (2023); 2× First-team All-Ivy League (2022, 2023)

Thor Griffith is an American professional football defensive tackle. He played college football at Harvard University from 2021 to 2023 and University of Louisville in 2024. He was signed as by the Seattle Seahawks an undrafted free agent in 2025.

== Early life ==
Griffith attended Portsmouth High School in New Hampshire and committed to play college football for the Harvard Crimson. His mother is South Korean.

Griffith wrestled alongside football. He was an All-American and team captain in 2018. That year, he also was named Portsmouth High School’s Most Valuable Player and Seacoast Wrestler of the Year, won the Division II state championship, and placed second at the New Hampshire Meet of Champions, fourth at the New England Wrestling Championship, and seventh at the NHSCA Virginia Beach Nationals.

== College career ==
=== Harvard ===
As a freshman in 2021, Griffith notched 31 tackles with 10.5 being for a loss, five sacks, and a forced fumble. In 2022, he made ten starts for Harvard, totaling 46 tackles with 12 being for a loss, and five sacks, earning first-team all-Ivy League honors. In 2023, Griffith tallied 55 tackles with 11 going for a loss along with three and a half sacks and again earned first-team all-Ivy League recognition. After the season, he entered his name into the NCAA transfer portal.

Griffith finished his career at Harvard playing in 30 games where he finished with 132 tackles with 33.5 being for a loss, and 13.5 sacks.

Griffith's personal records include a 40-yard dash time of 4.95 seconds and bench-pressing 225 pounds 45 times.

=== Louisville ===
Griffith transferred to play for the Louisville Cardinals.

Griffith was named to Bruce Feldman's of The Athletic top 100 "freaks" list in college football in 2023. He was named to the list for a second straight time in 2024.

== Professional career ==
Pre-draft measurables
Height	Weight	20-yard shuttle	Bench press
6 ft 1 3/4 in (1.87 m)	305 lb (138 kg)	4.84 s	42 reps
All values from Pro Day

=== Seattle Seahawks ===
On July 29, 2025, Griffith signed with the Seattle Seahawks after not being selected in the 2025 NFL draft. On July 31, he was waived by the Seahawks.

=== Saskatchewan Roughriders ===
On April 27, 2026, Griffith signed with the Saskatchewan Roughriders of the Canadian Football League (CFL). He was released on May 13.
