= Michael Weeden =

American politician

Member of the New Hampshire House of Representatives from the Strafford 6 district
- In office 2010–2012

Councilor of Dover, New Hampshire
- In office 2011–2013
- Preceded by: Gina Cruikshank

Personal details
- Born: March 11, 1991 (age 35) Dover, New Hampshire
- Party: Republican
- Profession: Politician

Michael Weeden is a Republican former member of the New Hampshire House of Representatives, serving the Strafford 6th District from 2010 to 2012. He was at the time the second youngest member of the New Hampshire House of Representatives. In 2010 he was the highest vote-getter in the Strafford County District 6 race. In 2011 he beat out incumbent Gina Cruikshank to become Dover's Ward 6 city councilor. In November 2013, he was defeated in his reelection bid by Jason Gagnon. On December 2, 2013, Weeden admittedly caused a motor vehicle accident that killed an 87-year-old man. According to police reports, Weeden's vehicle crossed the center lane while he was purportedly putting on his seatbelt. Former City Councilor Michael Weeden has been indicted on 3 felony charges of aggravated felonious sexual assault (anal rape or sodomy), allegedly involving a firearm, stemming from an incident in Dover involving his former girlfriend, according to law enforcement authorities, on May 18, 2014. On December 3, 2014 Weeden was found Not Guilty of Aggravated Felonious Sexual Assault. On Feb. 18th, 2015, Weeden was found guilty of Criminal Threatening, a Class A Felony. He faced up to 20 years in prison and a $4,000 fine. On July 8, Weeden was sentenced to 1 year in jail, with 3 years probation following, for the Criminal Threatening Felony conviction. Weeden was formerly a student at the University of New Hampshire.

== Personal life, education and career ==
Weeden was born in Dover, New Hampshire, on March 11, 1991. He entered Dover High School as a published poet. Weeden received the All-American Scholar Award at Large and the National History and Government Award. Weeden was also named a recipient of the National Leadership and Service Award. While attending Dover High School, Weeden was an active member in student council. In 2006, he was inducted as a member of the National Honor Society. He graduated from Dover High School in June 2009. In the fall of 2009 Weeden entered the University of New Hampshire with a declared major in Political Science.

Weeden suffered injuries in Boston on Oct. 7, 2012 after taking a bus to go see a New England Patriots game. There were differing reports as to what happened after the friends returned to Boston to catch a bus home after the game. Weeden claimed he was mugged as he walked back to South Station while his friend went to a club. According to a Dover police report filed by Weeden's mother, when Weeden did not return home that Sunday evening, Weeden attempted to get into the club but was denied entry because he was too intoxicated.

On Dec. 2, 2013, Weeden admittedly caused a motor vehicle accident on Sixth Street that killed an 87-year-old man. Weeden's vehicle crossed the center lane while he was purportedly putting on his seat belt. Criminal charges were not filed against him. Police concluded Weeden did not purposely, knowingly or recklessly cause the collision that took the life of Martin J. Carignan of Somersworth. On May 15, 2014 Weeden was indicted by a Strafford County Superior Court Grand Jury for Aggravated Felonious Sexual Assault (sodomy/anal rape). According to a report in the newspaper of record, Foster's Daily Democrat, a firearm may have been used during the assault. His trial on the aggravated rape charge began Dec. 1, 2014. On Feb. 18th, 2015, Weeden was found guilty of Criminal Threatening, a Class A Felony. He faces up to 20 years in prison and a $4,000 fine. On July 8, Weeden was sentenced to 1 year in jail, with 3 years probation following, for the Criminal Threatening Felony conviction.

== Political career ==
On June 7, 2010, Weeden filed for candidacy in the 2010 election. A Republican had not won a seat in the Strafford 6th District since 2004. On November 2, 2010 Weeden received the most votes in the Strafford County district 6 race, beating out 4 term Democratic incumbent Roland P. Hofemann by 70 votes.

On December 1, 2010 Weeden was sworn in as a member of the New Hampshire House of Representatives by Governor John H. Lynch. In January he was placed on the Constitutional Review and Statutory Recodification committee.

On January 28, 2011 Weeden became the Vice Chairman of the Dover GOP.

On April 17, 2011 Weeden announced on his website that he would be seeking a position on the Dover City Council. On July 2, 2011 Weeden formally announced that he would run for the Ward 6 City Council seat.

On November 8, 2011 Weeden won his bid for city council 522-455 against incumbent Gina Cruikshank. On January 2, 2012 Weeden was sworn into office as Dover Ward 6 City Councilor.

On June 1, 2012 Weeden became the chairman of the Dover GOP.

On June 8, 2012 Weeden announced on his website that he would be seeking re-election for State Representative Strafford 17th District.

On September 11, 2012 Weeden came in first in the GOP primary with 433 votes. He also received 4 Democratic write-in votes. He advanced to the general election on November 6, 2012, where he came in fourth in a race for three seats.

On June 26, 2013 Weeden announced that he would be seeking re-election for City Council.

On November 3, 2013 Weeden soundly lost his reelection bid to Jason Gagnon 414-339.

On May 15, 2014 Weeden was indicted by a Strafford County Superior Court Grand Jury for Aggravated Felonious Sexual Assault. According to a report in the newspaper of record, Foster's Daily Democrat, a firearm may have been used during the alleged assault.

On December 2, 2014, Weeden was found not guilty of aggravated sexual assault.

On Feb. 18th, 2015, Weeden was found guilty of Criminal Threatening.

On July 8, 2015, Weeden was sentenced to 2 months in jail, with 3 years probation following, for the Criminal Threatening Felony conviction.
