= Portsmouth High School (New Hampshire) =

High school in New Hampshire, United States

Coordinates: 43°03′33″N 70°45′57″W

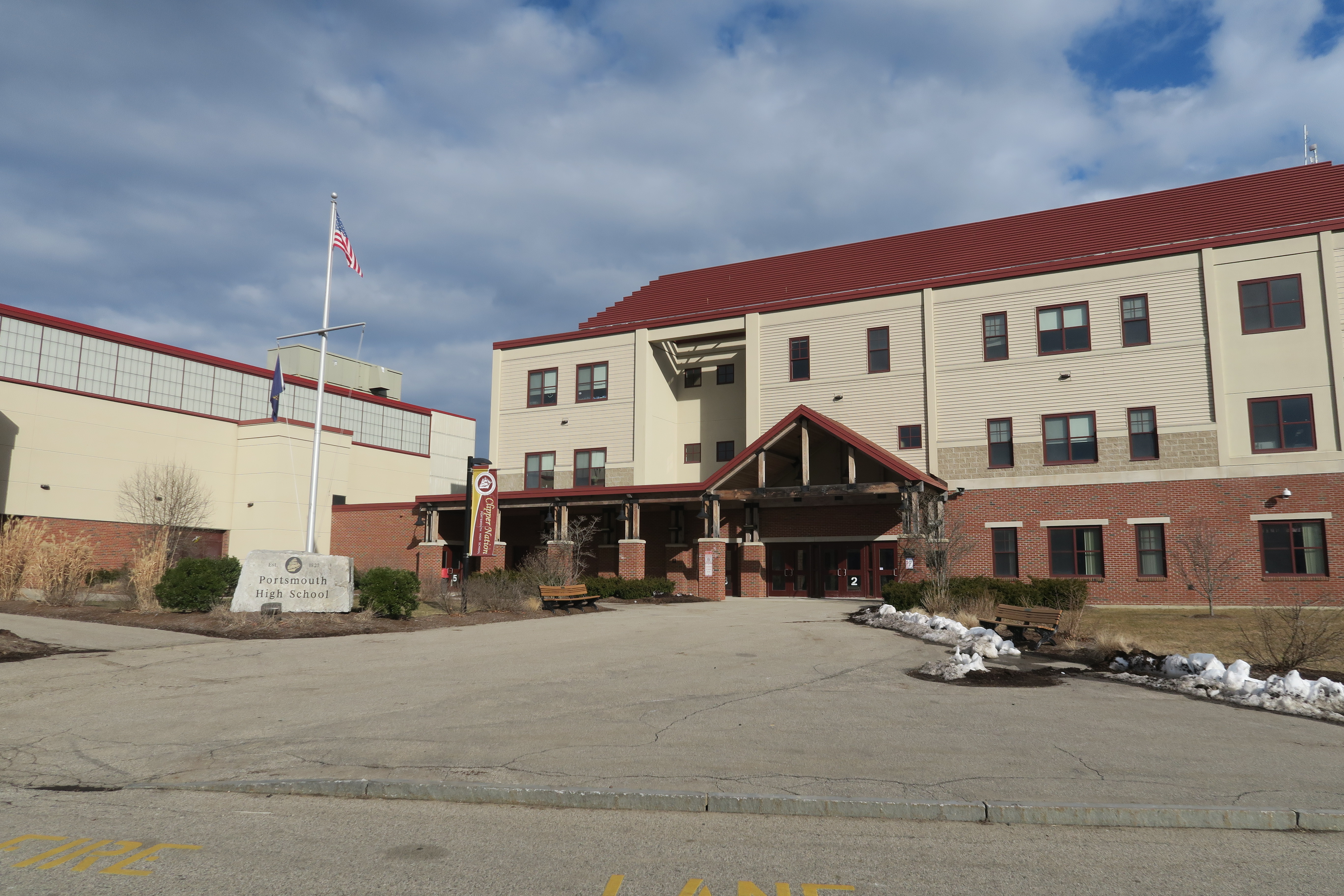

Location
- 50 Andrew Jarvis Drive; Portsmouth, (Rockingham County), New Hampshire 03801; United States

Information
- Type: Public high school
- Principal: Christopher Tebo
- Teaching staff: 87.00 (FTE)
- Enrollment: 1,025 (2023-2024)
- Student to teacher ratio: 11.78
- Colors: Maroon, Vegas gold and white
- Nickname: Clippers
- Website: https://www.portsmouthnh.gov/school/phs

Portsmouth High School is a public high school located in Portsmouth, New Hampshire with a current enrollment of approximately 1,100. Accredited by the New England Association of Colleges and Secondary Schools and the State of New Hampshire, the school serves the communities of Portsmouth, Rye, Greenland, New Castle and Newington, New Hampshire.

== Faculty ==
Portsmouth High School's faculty consists of 42 men and 70 women, 73% of whom hold a Master's degree or higher. Key faculty includes Principal Stephen Chinosi, Assistant Principal Shawn C. Donovan, Assistant Principal Charles Grossman. In addition, several other notable faculty members work in and around the school. Many have become involved in the community. Due to this involvement, Portsmouth High has a very positive relationship with the city and greater seacoast region.

== Curriculum and grading system ==
Classes at Portsmouth High School run for 80 minutes, with a new 43 minute FLEX block at the end of the day. There are four blocks (classes) in a day. Each 1-credit course meets for 90 days. The average class has 20 students. Students must complete 4 credits of English, 3 credits each of Math and Science, 2 1/2 credits of Social Studies, 1/2 credit of Fine Arts, Health, Economics, and a Computer course, and 1 credit of Physical Education. Portsmouth High School offers 192 courses within 18 departments with a variety of academic levels of difficulty.

26 Credits are required to graduate from Portsmouth High School. Credits are earned by the quarter. A semester is two consecutive quarters. Therefore, for a semester long course, the student will receive one full credit for passing both quarters or half credit for passing one quarter. Credits are posted at the end of each quarter. Report cards are issued after each term (four times during the year).

== Honors and A.P. programs ==
Admission to Honors and A.P. classes is based on student application and recommendation.

Portsmouth High School offers Honors classes in English 9, 10 and 11, American Studies 1, Algebra 2 and 3, Pre-calculus, Biology, Chemistry, Ecology, Earth Science and Physical Science. Advanced Placement courses are offered in English Literature and Composition, European History, United States History, Calculus AB/BC, Biology, Physics B, Statistics, Spanish Language, and French Language.

== Renovation ==
In 2000 the Portsmouth City Council voted and approved $36 million in city and state funds to renovate the aging school. In 2004 it was completed. The renovation offers students a new library, renovated auditorium, all new classrooms and science labs, a 100-seat lecture hall (called the Little Theatre), a renovated band and chorus area and many other notable features.

== Athletics ==
The Portsmouth High School Athletics Department holds many state championship titles.

- Girls Varsity Field Hockey Division-II State Champions (1982, 2021)
- Boys Varsity Lacrosse Division-II State Champions (2021)
- Girls Varsity Lacrosse Division-II State Champions (2021)
- Boys Varsity Basketball Division-I State Champions (2020)

== Notable alumni ==
- Thor Griffith, Class of 2020, college football defensive tackle for the Harvard Crimson and the Louisville Cardinals
- Elizabeth Virgil, Class of 1922, first African American to graduate from the University of New Hampshire
