= Enid MacRobbie =

British biologist and biophysicist (1931–2024)

Enid Anne Campbell MacRobbie, FRS, FRSE
- Born: 5 December 1931; Edinburgh, Scotland
- Died: 22 September 2024 (aged 92); Derbyshire, England
- Education: Life Fellow of Girton College
- Occupations: Professor, plant scientist
- Known for: Ion fluxes and stomata

Enid Anne Campbell MacRobbie (5 December 1931 – 22 September 2024) was a Scottish plant scientist who was emeritus Professor of Plant Biophysics at the University of Cambridge and a Life Fellow of Girton College. Her specialty was biophysics, with particular interests in ion fluxes and stomata.

Born on 5 December 1931, in Edinburgh, MacRobbie was appointed "to a Personal Professorship in 1987, the first woman scientist in Cambridge to be awarded a Personal Chair." She was elected a Fellow of the Royal Society of London in 1991 and of the Royal Society of Edinburgh in 1998. She was also a Foreign Member of the National Academy of Sciences and a Corresponding Member of the American Society of Plant Biologists. Roger Spanswick was a member of her laboratory.

MacRobbie died on 22 September 2024, at the age of 92.

== Selected works ==
- MacRobbie, E.A.C. (2000) "ABA activates multiple Ca^{2+} fluxes in stomatal guard cells, triggering vacuolar K^{+} (Rb^{+}) release." Proc. Natl. Acad. Sci. USA, 97: 12361–12368.
- MacRobbie, E.A.C. (2002) "Evidence for a role for protein tyrosine phosphatase in the control of ion release from the guard cell vacuole in stomatal closure." Proc. Natl. Acad. Sci. USA, 99: 11563–11568.
