= Juri M. Vasiliev =

Russian cell biologist

Juri Markovich Vasiliev (1928 – 2018) was a Russian cell biologist, working at the Academy of Medical Sciences of the USSR, and Moscow State University. He was best known for his work on the movement of cancer cells.

== Early life ==
Vasiliev was born November 26, 1928, in Moscow. His mother, Nadezhda Sergeevna Vasilieva, was a psychiatrist. In October 1941, Vasiliev's family fled Moscow ahead of the German army's advance; his father died soon thereafter from a foot injury he had suffered on the journey. After the war, Vasiliev and his mother returned to Moscow, where his excellent academic performance in high school earned him entrance to the Medical Institute. There, he joined the laboratory of Leon Manusovich Shabad. Vasiliev later recounted his time in Shabad's laboratory as "one of the happiest periods of his life". During this time he married Lina Naumovna and they had their first children together.

In 1953, political purges resulted in the closure of Shabad's laboratory. However, Vasiliev was permitted to complete his thesis, and he received his medical degree. As relations with the West began to improve, the new President of the Academy of Medical Sciences, N. N. Blokhin, chose Vasiliev among a small group of young scientists to leave the Soviet Union for training. Vasiliev trained in laboratories in England and then in the United States.

== Scientific career ==
Upon his return to Moscow, Vasiliev began what would be a longstanding collaboration with the mathematician Israel Gelfand, and took up a position at Moscow State University. There his work focused on the movement of tumor cells in cell culture, the output of which included "his most famous paper", a 1970 description of the effect of colcemid on cell movement. This was the first demonstration that microtubules are required to stabilize the leading edge of moving cells. Vasiliev long held the position of Professor in Moscow State University's Department of Virology. In 1990, he was elected a corresponding member of the Russian Academy of Sciences.

Over his career in academia, Vasiliev published over 200 works of science, authored several books, and advised 31 PhD theses and 12 medical doctoral dissertations.
