= Matt Chandler (writer) =

American author (born 1972)

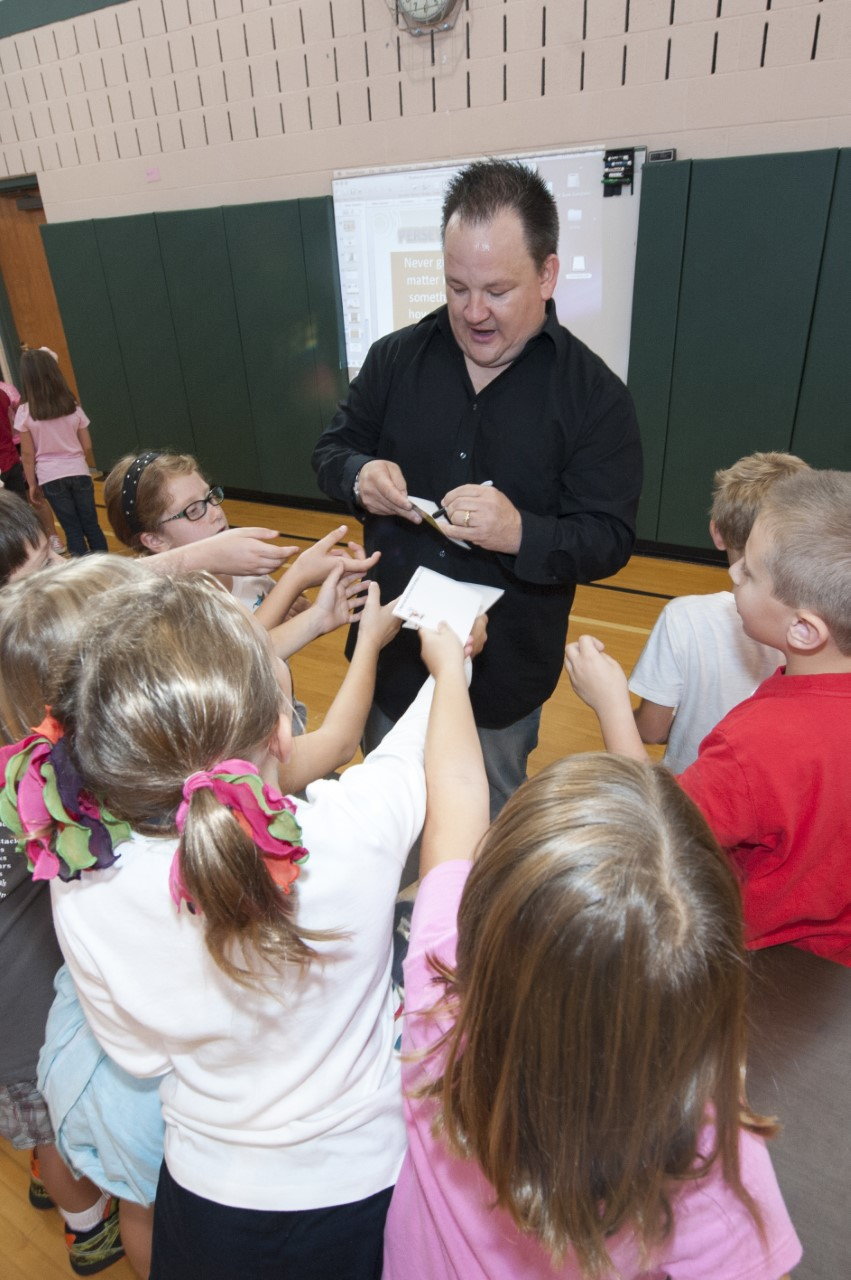
- Matt Chandler in 2013
- Born: October 24, 1972 (age 53); Ithaca, New York, United States
- Education: SUNY Buffalo State (B.A.)
- Occupation: Children's book author
- Spouse: Amber Chandler
- Children: 2
- Writing career
- Period: 2010-present
- Genre: Children's
- Subjects: Primarily non-fiction with a focus on sports as well as ghosts and hauntings
- Notable awards: 2015 Outstanding Book Award, American Society of Journalists and Authors
- Website: www.mattchandlerwriting.com

Matt Chandler (born 1972) is an American author of more than 85 books for young children, including Side-by-Side Baseball Stars: Comparing the Game's Greatest Players, which was selected by the American Society of Journalists and Authors as its 2015 Children's/Young Adult Book of the Year.

== Books ==
Chandler has published 85+ children's books, working primarily with Capstone Publishers, as well as with Cherry Lake Publishing, Callisto Media and Sports Illustrated Kids.

Ghosts and Haunted Titles

- Alcatraz (a "You Choose" Adventure)
- The World's Most Haunted Places
- Daring Escape from Alcatraz
- Ghosts of the Alamo and Other Hauntings of the South
- Bachelor's Grove Cemetery and Other Haunted Places of the Midwest
- Famous Ghost Stories of North America
- Famous Ghost Stories of Europe
- Ghosts of the OK Corral and Other Hauntings of Tombstone Arizona
- The Alamo's Ghosts and Other Hauntings of San Antonio Texas

Sports Titles

- Basketball's Best Coaches
- Patrick Mahomes: Football MVP
- Kevin Durant: Basketball Champion
- Alex Morgan: Soccer Champion
- Chloe Kim: Gold Medal Snowboarder
- Giannis Antetokounmpo: Basketball Powerhouse
- Khalil Mack: Football Dominator
- Adam Thielen: Football's Underdog Star
- Klay Thompson: Basketball Sharpshooter
- Megan Rapinoe: World Cup Champion
- Aly Raisman: Gold Medal Gymnast
- Mike Trout: Baseball MVP
- Coco Gauff: Tennis Champion
- Nyjah Huston: Skateboard Superstar
- Fernando Tatis Jr.: Big-Time Hitter
- Sabrina Ionescu: Rising Basketball Star
- Declan Farmer: Paralympic Hockey Star
- Chad Kerley: BMX's Breakout Star
- Zion Williamson: Basketball's Rising Star
- Christian Yelich: Baseball MVP
- James Harden: Basketball Sharpshooter
- Luka Doncic: Basketball's Breakout Star
- Breanna Stewart: Pro Basketball MVP
- Lamar Jackson: Superstar Quarterback
- Wacky Baseball Trivia
- Wacky Basketball Trivia
- Pro Baseball Records: A Guide for Every Fan
- Pro Basketball Records: A Guide for Every Fan
- The Science of Basketball
- The Science of Baseball
- The Science of Hockey
- Side by Side Baseball Stars: Comparing the Game's Greatest Players
- Who's Who of Pro Baseball: A Guide to the Game's Greatest Players
- Outrageous Pro Wrestling Rivalries
- Deer Hunting for Kids
- Bear Hunting for Kids
- Tae Kwon Do: A Guide for Athletes and Fans
- Gymnastics: A Guide for Athletes and Fans
- Football: A Guide for Players and Fans
- Boys' Lacrosse: A Guide for Players and Fans
- On the Court: Biographies of Today's Best Basketball Players
- Baseball's Greatest Walk-Offs and Other Crunch Time Heroics
- Soccer's Greatest Last Second Shots and Other Crunch Time Heroics
- Football's Greatest Hail Mary Passes and Other Crunch Time Heroics

Graphic Novel Titles

- Behind Enemy Lines: The Escape of Robert Grimes with the Comet Line
- Outrunning the Nazis: The Brave Escape of Resistance Fighter Sven Somme
- The Trojan War
- Ninjas: Japan's Stealthy Secret Agents

Health Titles (Cherry Lake Publishing)

- Understanding Mental Health
- Understanding Suicide
- Understanding Obesity
- Understanding Tobacco

Other Titles

- Military Drones
- Recreational Drones
- Dangerous Times: History's Most Troubled Eras
- Balloons for Heaven
- The Adventures of Larry the Lunchbox Lizard: First Time With a Babysitter
- The Tech Behind Off-Road Vehicles
- The Tech Behind Electric Cars
- The Tech Behind Concept Cars
- The Tech Behind Self-Driving Cars
- Daring Escape from Alcatraz
- First Bear Hunt
- Catfish Noodling
- The Apollo 11 Moon Landing: Spot the Myths

== Magazine writing ==
Chandler has written for a number of regional and national magazines including SuperLawyers, American Legion Magazine, Gentry, Buffalo Magazine, and Buffalo Spree.

- Cover story on attorney James Harrington, Super Lawyers Magazine, August 2016
- Cover story on attorney Ginger Schroder, Super Lawyers Magazine, August 2015
- "Tin Can Soldiers", American Legion Magazine

== Essays ==
His essays have appeared in four books within the internationally best-selling series Chicken Soup for the Soul, including:

- "Chicken Soup for the Soul: Think Positive"
- "Chicken Soup for the Soul: Hooked on Hockey"
- "Chicken Soup for the Soul: Time to Thrive"
- "Chicken Soup for the Soul: Think Positive, Live Happy"

== Author visits to elementary schools ==
In addition to his writing, Chandler visits elementary schools to present "author visits". His presentations are designed to inspire children and encourage reading, while being fun and entertaining. In a 2016 interview with the West Seneca Bee, Chandler had this to say about his school visits: "I took a very unconventional path to becoming a writer and overcame long odds, so I really try to reach them (the students) and show them they can follow their dreams and achieve anything if they are willing to work hard and never give up."

== Awards ==
Chandler is a six-time New York Press Association Award winner, having earned recognition for his columns and feature writing while a newspaper reporter for Buffalo Business First, the Buffalo Law Journal, and The Hamburg Sun.

He was also recognized by the American Society of Journalists and Authors with its 2015 award for Best Children's/Young Adult book for his Capstone Press/Sports Illustrated Kids book, Side by Side Baseball Stars: Comparing the Game's Greatest Players.
