= Dover School District (New Hampshire) =

School district in Dover, New Hampshire

Location
- Dover, NH (district office) North America United States

District information
- Type: Public
- Motto: Empowering all learners
- Grades: K – 12th
- Superintendent: William Harbron, Ed.D.
- Schools: Elementary (3); Middle (1); High (1)
- NCES District ID: 3302640

Students and staff
- Students: 4,101
- Teachers: 272.90
- Student–teacher ratio: 15.03
- District mascot: Green Wave
- Colors: Green and White

Other information
- District ID: ISD #141
- SAU ID: SAU #11
- Website: http://www.dover.k12.nh.us/

Dover School District is an independent public school district whose district office is located in Dover, New Hampshire.

== District Office ==
The district office address is:

McConnell Center
61 Locust Street
Dover, NH 03820

The district office phone numbers are:

(603) 516-6800

== Schools ==
The district consists of the following schools:

Schools
School	Grades	Address	Phone Numbers	Principal
Garrison Elementary School	K-4	50 Garrison Road; Dover, NH 03820	(603) 516-6752	Beth Dunton
Horne Street Elementary School	K-4	78 Horne Street; Dover, NH 03820	(603) 516-6756	Michael McKenney
Woodman Park Elementary School	K-4	11 Towle Avenue; Dover, NH 03820	(603) 516-6700	Patrick Boodey
Dover Middle School	5-8	16 Daley Drive; Dover, NH 03820	(603) 516-7200	Kim Lyndes
Dover High School	9-12	25 Alumni Drive; Dover, NH 03820	(603) 516-6900	Peter Driscoll

Dover High School is also home to the regional Career Technical Center (CTC).

== School Board ==
The Dover school board consists of 9 members:

- 7 Community members.
- 1 Superintendent.
- 1 Student representative.
