= Elizabeth Virgil =

American educator (1903–1991)

Elizabeth Ann Virgil
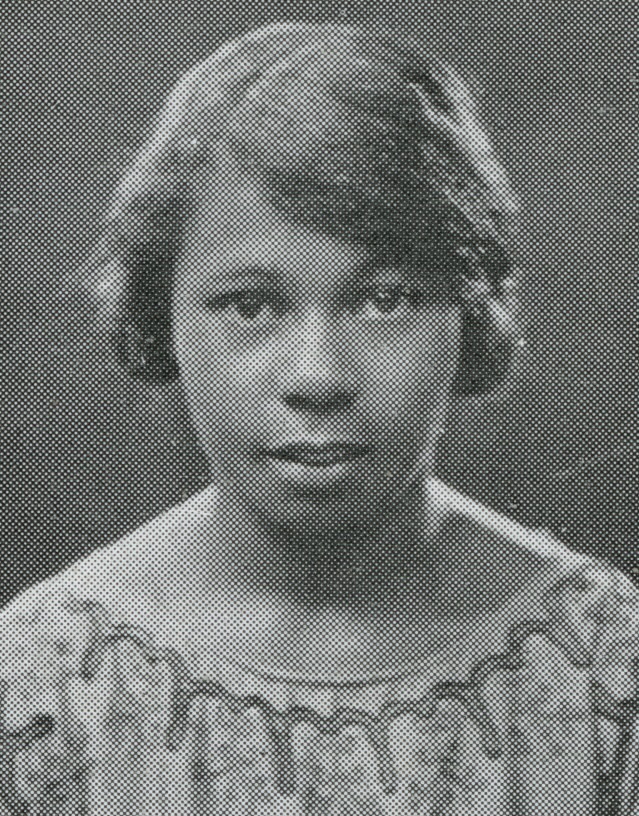
- Virgil in 1926
- Born: April 24, 1903; Plymouth, Massachusetts, US
- Died: June 20, 1991 (aged 88)
- Education: University of New Hampshire
- Occupations: Educator, clerk

Elizabeth Ann Virgil (April 24, 1903 – June 20, 1991) was an American educator and the first African American to graduate from the University of New Hampshire, receiving her Bachelor of Science degree in home economics in 1926. She taught at Black schools and colleges in the southern United States for over a decade before returning to New Hampshire, where she worked for her alma mater from 1951 to 1973.

== Life and career ==
Virgil was born on April 24, 1903, in Plymouth, Massachusetts, to Alberta Curry Virgil and Wilcox Virgil. Her mother was the daughter of an emancipated slave from Virginia, and her father had immigrated to Virginia from the West Indies. As a seven-year old, Virgil moved to Portsmouth, New Hampshire, with her family. She graduated from Portsmouth High School in 1922.

Virgil enrolled at the University of New Hampshire, where she was active in the glee and other student clubs, played piano and organ, and co-founded the Treble Clefs, a group of singers. Her collegiate experiences seem to have been positive, and on May 26, 1926, she graduated from the University of New Hampshire with a Bachelor of Science degree in home economics, becoming the first African American to graduate from the university.

Barred from teaching in New Hampshire public schools on account of her race, Virgil accepted jobs as an instructor at racially segregated Black schools and historically Black colleges in the southern United States, including the Virginia Normal and Industrial Institute in Petersburg, Bowie Normal School in Maryland, and the Johnston County Training School in Smithfield, North Carolina, where she taught the seventh grade to students ranging in age from 11 to 22. Her school district sent her to take advanced courses at Teachers College, Columbia University, in New York.

In the late 1930s, Virgil returned to New Hampshire to care for her mother, whose health was failing. Still unable to find a teaching position on account of her race, she worked a variety of jobs, serving as a secretary at a doctor's office, a clerk-typist at Portsmouth Naval Shipyard, and a demonstrator of gas appliances. In 1951, she became a clerk in the soil conservation department at the University of New Hampshire, where she entered data and typed scientific reports, among other responsibilities. She held this position at her alma mater for twenty-two years, until her retirement in 1973.

Committed to community service and to the welfare of her alma mater and its students, she sang in community and Congregational Church choirs and served on the UNH president's council. She also established the Alberta Curry Virgil Scholarship at UNH in memory of her mother. In 1991, a few months before Virgil's death, UNH commissioned Grant Drumheller to paint her portrait. It hangs in the lobby of Dimond Library. In 2018, Portsmouth High School honored Virgil with a faculty appointment in perpetuity and unveiled a school mural featuring her.
