= Peter K. Hepler =

American academic

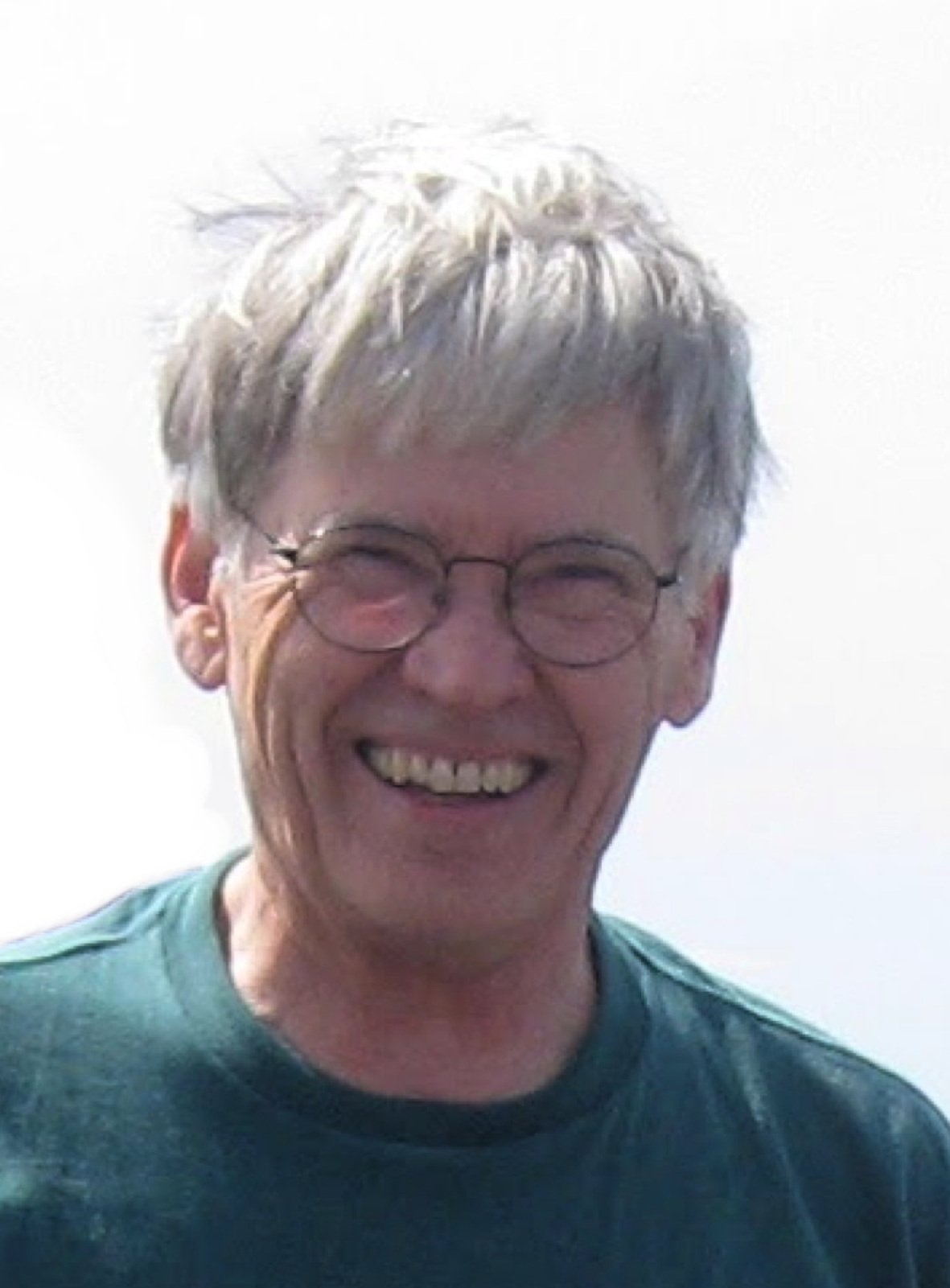
- Born: October 29, 1936 (age 90); Dover, New Hampshire, US
- Education: University of New Hampshire, B.S. Chemistry 1958; University of Wisconsin, Ph.D. Plant Cell Biology 1964
- Known for: Cell biology, plant physiology, microscopy
- Scientific career
- Fields: Cell biology, plant physiology, microscopy
- Workplaces: Stanford University; University of Massachusetts at Amherst
- Website: Peter K. Hepler; Molecular & Cellular Biology

Peter Klock Hepler HonFRMS (born 1936) is the Constantine J. Gilgut and Ray Ethan Torrey Professor Emeritus in the Biology Department of the University of Massachusetts at Amherst who is notable for his work on elucidating the roles of calcium, membranes and the cytoskeleton in plant cell development and cell motility.

== Personal life ==
Peter Klock Hepler was born on October 29, 1936, in Dover, New Hampshire, to Jesse Raymond Hepler and Rebecca Orpha Peterson Hepler. He married Margaret (Peggy) Dennison Hunt on March 7, 1964. They have three children: Sarah, Anna and Lukas. Peter and Peggy have six grandchildren: Finn, Leif, Louisa (Lulu), Jesse, Marit, and Haakon. In an interview published in the Newsletter of the American Society of Plant Biologists, Hepler was asked, "What is your most treasured possession?" He answered, "My family; but I don't possess them." Peter and Peggy Hepler live on a farm in Pelham, Massachusetts that was established in 1740 and is now a part of the Kestrel Land Trust.

== University life ==
Peter Hepler graduated from Dover High School in 1954. He received his B.S. in chemistry from the University of New Hampshire in 1958 and earned his Ph.D. in plant cell biology from University of Wisconsin in 1964, studying the role of cortical microtubules in plant cell development with Eldon H. Newcomb. After receiving his Ph.D., Hepler served at the Walter Reed Army Institute of Research until 1966, studying malarial parasites. Hepler then returned to the University of Wisconsin for a postdoctoral fellowship and then became a postdoctoral fellow with Keith Porter at Harvard University from 1966 to 1967, where he continued his investigation of microtubules, focusing on their role in the mitotic apparatus and the phragmoplast of the endosperm cells of Haemanthus Katharinae. After being an assistant professor at Stanford University, Hepler joined the faculty in the Botany Department at the University of Massachusetts at Amherst. He was an associate professor from 1977 to 1980, a professor from 1980 to 1989, and became the Ray Ethan Torrey Professor in 1989 and the Constantine J. Gilgut Professor in 1998. Hepler retired from the Biology Department as the Constantine J. Gilgut and Ray Ethan Torrey Professor Emeritus, although he continues to do research. Hepler spent many summers teaching and doing research at the Marine Biological Laboratory at Woods Hole, Massachusetts. Hepler also participated in a multiyear international collaboration with Brian E. S. Gunning.

Hepler was an associate editor of Protoplasma from 1994 to 2001 and associate editor of Plant Physiology from 1998 to 2000. He has been on the editorial boards of the Annual Review Plant Physiology, Plant and Cell Physiology, the Journal of Submicroscopic Cytology, Cell Motility and the Cytoskeleton, and BioEssays.

== Research ==
Hepler's scientific method is to know thoroughly the classical botanical literature and then develop or apply modern physico-chemical techniques to answer salient and extensive biological questions using plants that are well-suited to answer those questions. In so doing, Hepler opened whole areas of research. Hepler did pioneering work in showing the relationship of the microscopic elements of the cytoskeleton to the macroscopic properties of plant growth, development and function. He also did pioneering work on plasmodesmata, stomatal function, the role of calcium in plant development and in the development of techniques useful for answering questions using light and electron microscopy. Hepler's scientific publications with Barry A. Palevitz are notable for quoting Woody Allen and Yogi Berra.

Hepler described his realization of the influence a review he and Palevitz wrote on microtubules and microfilaments "to introduce new thoughts and promising avenues for future research" had with his characteristic self-deprecating sense of humor: "I became aware that the review was being read widely one summer (1979) while working in the library at the Marine Biological Laboratory. I turned to the library's volume of the Annual Review of Plant Physiology that contained our paper and when I put the volume down, it literally fell open at our article; worn edges on the pages and the penciled corrections of all the misspellings and punctuation errors indicated that the chapter had been thoroughly perused."

Hepler, along with Ledbetter and Porter, is considered to be a co-discoverer of microtubules.

=== Microtubules and cell shape ===
In late 1962 and early 1963, Hepler tested the newly developed procedure using a glutaraldehyde pre-fix followed by an osmium post-fix to study plant cell structure using an electron microscope. Building on the earlier work by Sinnott and Bloch, who had shown that wounding the existing tracheary elements in a Coleus stem induced neighboring parenchyma cells to differentiate into new tracheary elements, Hepler showed that cytoplasmic microtubules were localized specifically in the cortical cytoplasm immediately over the bands of new secondary wall thickenings. Moreover, Hepler discovered that the microtubules were oriented parallel to the cellulose microfibrils of the newly formed secondary wall thickenings. This work, along with the studies of Ledbetter and Porter and Green established the importance of cortical microtubules in controlling the alignment of cellulose microfibrils in the cell wall. Further work with Barry Palevitz showed that microtubules were involved in orienting the cellulose microfibrils in the walls of guard cells in a pattern of radial micellation that is necessary for stomatal function. Hepler, along with the husband and wife team of Dale Callaham and Sue Lancelle, developed a method to achieve rapid freeze fixation of particularly small plant cells that showed that cortical microtubules are closely associated with one another, actin microfilaments, the endoplasmic reticulum and the plasma membrane.

=== Microtubules and cell motility ===
Building on the work of Shinya Inoué and Andrew Bajer using polarized light microscopy, Hepler used electron microscopy to elucidate the nature of the microtubule/chromosome attachments at the kinetochore as well as the arrangement of the microtubules in the phragmoplast during the development of the new cell wall, where microtubules from both sides of the phragmoplast were seen to overlap with one another in the plane of the cell plate.

Hepler realized that microtubules were dynamic structures that were deployed in various locations throughout the cell, and became interested in the mechanisms involved in microtubule organization in cells that lacked a microtubule-organizing center known as the centrosome. In order to understand how microtubule-organizing centers were generated, Hepler examined the de novo formation of the blepharoplast in the spermatogenous cells of Marsilea vestita. The blepharoplast in each spermatid generates 100–150 basal bodies, each of which gives rise to the 9+2 arrangement of microtubules in a cilium. During telophase of the penultimate division, flocculent material appears near clefts on the distal surfaces of the daughter nuclei. During prophase of the final division which gives rise to the spermatids, the flocculent material near each nucleus condenses to give rise to two blepharoplasts, which then separate, one going to each spermatid.

While Hepler was successful in identifying an aggregation of material that possessed microtubule-organizing capacity, he was not able to specify the biophysical mechanisms involved in organization. After Richard Weisenberg discovered that microtubule polymerization was sensitive to calcium concentration, Hepler realized that he had already seen a close association between elements of the endoplasmic reticulum and microtubules in the mitotic apparatus and in the phragmoplast and suggested that these membranes may function in controlling the concentration of free calcium in the mitotic apparatus. Along with Susan Wick and Steve Wolniak, Hepler showed that the endoplasmic reticulum contained stores of calcium and suggested that the endoplasmic reticulum may locally control the calcium concentration and thus the polymerization/depolymerization of microtubules. Subsequently, Hepler, along with Dale Callaham, Dahong Zhang, and Patricia Wadsworth, observed calcium ion transients during mitosis and showed that the microinjection of calcium ions into the mitotic spindle does regulate the depolymerization of microtubules and the movement of chromosomes to the poles during mitosis.

=== Microfilaments and cytoplasmic streaming ===
Hepler identified actin microfilaments in bundles at the ectoplasm-endoplasm interface of Nitella internodal cells by showing that the bundles bound heavy meromyosin, giving the characteristic arrowhead arrangement. The actin microfilaments had the correct polarity to be part of the actomyosin motor that provides the motive force for cytoplasmic streaming in these giant algal cells.

=== Calcium and plant development ===
Hepler has shown that calcium ions are a central regulator of plant growth and development specifically demonstrating that calcium is important for tip growth and in phytochrome. and cytokinin action.

=== Pollen tube growth ===
Hepler's research is currently aimed at finding the ionic and molecular components that make up the pacemaker that regulates the oscillatory growth of pollen tubes. He has shown that calcium ions and protons are essential for growth. The intracellular free calcium ions exist in a gradient dropping from 3000 nM at the tip to 200 nM 20 μm from the tip and the intracellular H^{+} gradient falls from pH 6.8 at the tip to pH 7.5 10–30 μm from the tip. The higher concentrations of intracellular Ca^{2+} and H^{+} at the tip result from the localization of the influx of these ions at the tip. The protons are effluxed at a region on the sides of the tube that corresponds to the location of the intracellular alkaline band. Energy is required for pollen tube growth and an H^{+}-ATPase may mediate the efflux. Hepler has shown that the magnitude of the intracellular calcium and proton gradients and the extracellular fluxes of these ions oscillate with a period of 15-50 s. This period is identical to the period of oscillation in the rate of pollen tube growth, however, the intracellular calcium peak follows the growth rate peak by 1–4 seconds, and the extracellular calcium peak follows the growth rate peak by 11–15 seconds. The delay between the extracellular and intracellular calcium peaks indicates that calcium ions do not immediately enter the cytoplasmic pool. Hepler postulates that the extracellular influx of calcium is not governed by the plasma membrane but by changes in the ion-binding properties of the pectin within the cell wall. The pectin is secreted in its uncharged methylester form. Subsequently, a pectin methylesterase in the wall results in the de-esterification of the methyl groups that yields carboxyl residues that bind calcium and form calcium-pectate cross-bridges. This calcium binding may account for the bulk of the observed extracellular current. The intracellular calcium gradient may direct the location of secretion of cell wall components that define the direction of pollen tube growth.

The intracellular components that contribute to pollen tube growth include the actin-mediated transfer of Golgi-derived secretory vesicles filled with methylesterified homogalacturonans and pectin methylesterase synthesized on the ER to the growing tip. The secretion of the vesicles at the growing tip anticipates the increase in growth rate, indicating that the turgor pressure driven intussusception of the methylesterified pectin into the cell wall at the growing tip and its subsequent demethylesterification by pectin methylesterase may relax the cell wall by robbing the load-bearing calcium pectate bonds of its Ca^{2+}. This would result in a slightly delayed yet increased growth rate. The removal of the methoxy groups in the pectins at the flanks of the apical dome unmasks their negatively charged carboxylate groups. The anionic homogalacturonans then bind Ca^{2+} and become stiffer as the new apical dome, which will incorporate more methylesterified pectins and pectin methylesterase, grows away from the stiffened flanks composed of calcium pectate. The external Ca^{2+} concentration is critical. When the external Ca^{2+} concentration is below 10 μM, the amount of calcium pectate is so low that the cell wall is too weak and the pollen tube bursts. When the external Ca^{2+} concentration is above 10 mM, the amount of calcium pectate is so high that the cell wall is too stiff and the pollen tube will not grow.

== Honors and awards ==
- In 1975, Hepler was the fourth recipient of the Jeanette Siron Pelton Award given by the Botanical Society of America, because his "penetrating analytical and experimental studies of the ultrastructure of differentiating cells have made a significant and lasting contribution to our perception of morphogenesis at the cellular level. In particular his work on the ultrastructure of differentiating xylem elements, on the roles of microtubules and microfibrils, and on the control of the orientation of mitotic spindles in differentiating cells have provided new insights which hold great promise for the future."
- In 2007, Hepler was named an inaugural Fellow of the American Society of Plant Biologists.
- In 2010, Hepler was elected as a Fellow of the American Association for the Advancement of Science for his contributions as "one of the most influential plant cell biologists, who has continuously and continues to achieve breakthroughs that have guided research directions of numerous plant scientists."
- In 2011, Hepler was honored with the Charles Reid Barnes Life Membership Award from the American Society of Plant Biologists.
- In 2015, Hepler was named an Honorary Fellow of the Royal Microscopical Society for his contributions to plant science, including publishing the first report suggesting a co-alignment of microtubules with cell wall cellulose microtubules.
- A scholarship was named in honor of Hepler. The Peter K. Hepler Research Scholarship supports undergraduate research on a biological question in a laboratory or field setting outside of the United States.
- The Plant Biology Graduate Program at the University of Massachusetts Amherst held a symposium on October 14, 2017, entitled: Capturing the dynamic architecture of cells: Honoring the high-resolution career of Peter Hepler. Friends, family, students, and colleagues celebrated his life and contributions to plant cell biology.
