= Joseph Moreau =

American historian

Dr. Joseph Moreau is the American author of Schoolbook Nation, a 2003 nonfiction book detailing the conflict over the teaching of American history from the Civil War onward. He is currently a history teacher at Abraham Joshua Heschel High School in New York City.

Moreau was born and raised in Dover, New Hampshire. He attended the University of New Hampshire for his undergraduate degree, and later received his Ph.D. in American Culture from the University of Michigan. Moreau formerly taught history at Trinity High School in New York.
