= John Root (politician) =

English-American politician (1937–2025)

Member of the New Hampshire House of Representatives from the Grafton 8th district
- In office 1996–1998

Personal details
- Born: John Michael Root; June 24, 1937 London, England
- Died: May 10, 2025 (aged 87) San Antonio, Texas, U.S.
- Party: Republican; Democratic
- Education: University of New Hampshire

John Michael Root (June 24, 1937 – May 10, 2025) was an English-American politician. A member of the Republican Party and the Democratic Party, he served in the New Hampshire House of Representatives from 1996 to 1998.

== Life and career ==
Root was born in London, the son of Jonathan and Margaret Root. At an early age, he emigrated to the United States with his mother, settling in Danbury, New Hampshire. He attended and graduated from Bristol High School. After graduating, he attended the University of New Hampshire, earning his degree in political science. He was a second lieutenant in the United States Air Force.

In 1994, Root ran as a Republican candidate for New Hampshire state senator from the 2nd district. He received 1,825 votes, but lost in the Republican primary election to candidate Ned Gordon, who won with 1,929 votes.

Root served in the New Hampshire House of Representatives from 1996 to 1998.

== Death ==
Root died at his home in San Antonio, Texas on May 10, 2025, at the age of 87.
