= Jesse Hepler Lilac Arboretum =

The Jesse Hepler Lilac Arboretum was located on the University of New Hampshire campus in Durham, New Hampshire, USA, at 4 Library Way, from 1940 to 1980.

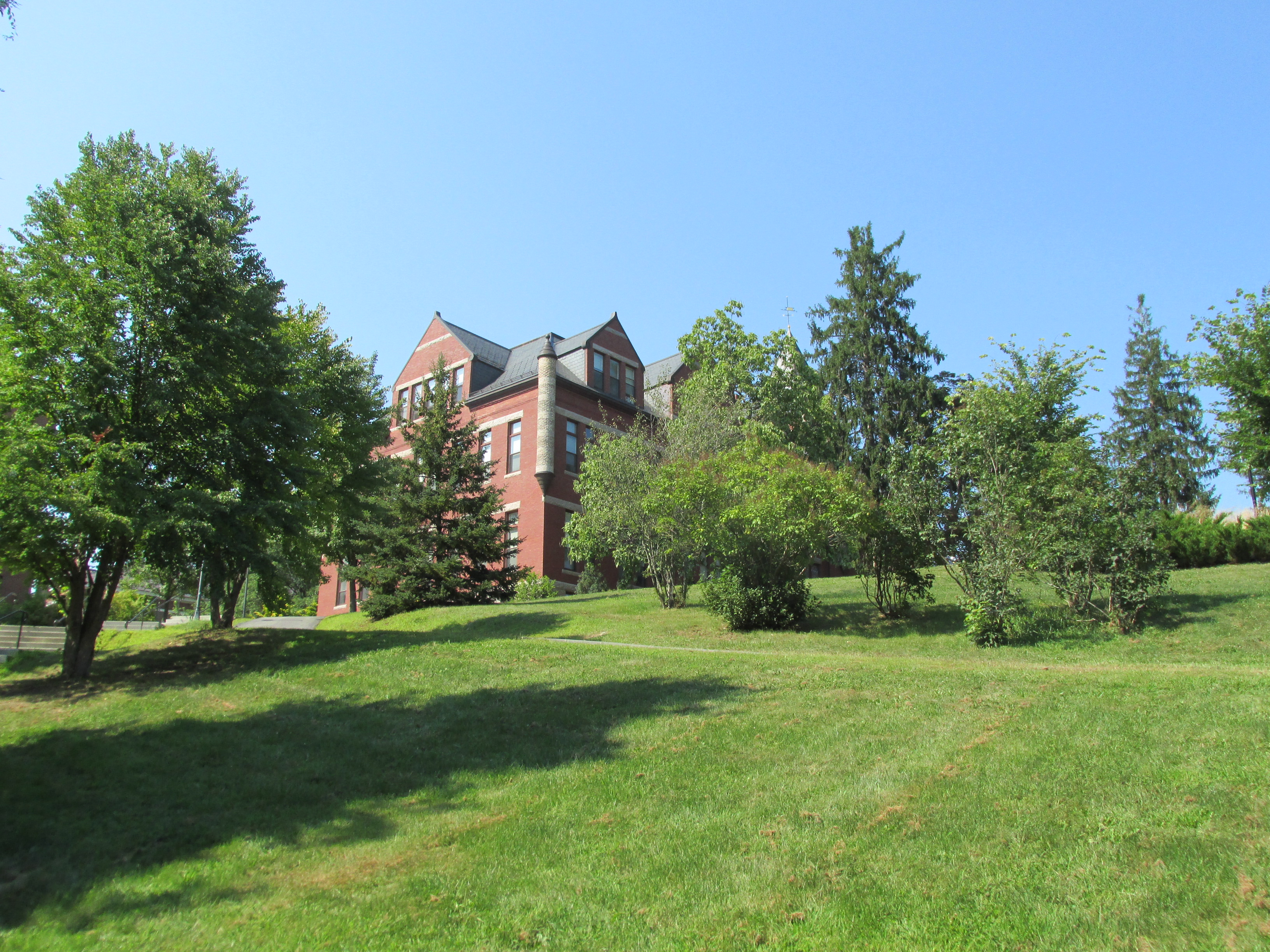
The slope behind Thompson Hall

Jesse R. Hepler was acting chairman of the horticulture department in 1938, and suggested establishing a lilac arboretum on the slope behind Thompson Hall, a site that became known as Lilac Hill. It was dedicated in 1940, and in 1948 many of the research species were relocated there. It had 100 varieties of lilac (Syringa species) in seven color classes. By 1980, the genetic range had diminished due to cross breeding, and the decision was taken to uproot the arboretum. The lilac is the state flower of New Hampshire, and the plants were offered to the campus community. Lilac lovers wanting plants for their gardens cleared the site within 90 minutes. The continuing research into lilacs was moved to the UNH Horticultural Research facility at Woodman Farm, Spinney Lane, in Durham (at 43.1513°N 70.9440°W).

== See also ==
- List of botanical gardens in the United States
