= Cytoskeleton (journal) =

- Discipline: Cell biology
- Language: English
- Edited by: Julian Guttman

Publication details
- Former name(s): Cell Motility, Cell Motility and the Cytoskeleton
- History: 1980–present
- Publisher: Wiley
- Frequency: Monthly
- Open access: Hybrid
- Impact factor: 2.4 (2023)

Standard abbreviations
- ISO 4: Cytoskeleton

Indexing
- Cell Motility and the Cytoskeleton
- CODEN: CMCYEO
- ISSN: 0886-1544 (print); 1097-0169 (web)
- LCCN: 86642506
- OCLC no.: 12848217
- Cytoskeleton
- CODEN: CYTOBO
- ISSN: 1949-3584

Links
- Journal homepage; Online access; Online archive

Cytoskeleton is a peer-reviewed scientific journal covering cytoskeletal research. The journal publishes original research pertaining to cell motility and cytoskeletons, spanning genetic and cell biological observations, biochemical, biophysical and structural studies, mathematical modeling, and theory. It was established in 1980 as Cell Motility. From 1989 to 2009 it was named Cell Motility and the Cytoskeleton, before obtaining its current name in 2010. The editor-in-chief is Julian Guttman (Simon Fraser University). According to the Journal Citation Reports, the journal has a 2020 impact factor of 2.141, ranking it 169th out of 195 journals in the category "Cell Biology".
