= Ken Sanders =

Ken Sanders may refer to:

- Ken Sanders (American football) (born 1950), American football player
- Ken Sanders (baseball) (1941–2026), American baseball pitcher
- Ken Sanders (book dealer) (born 1951), American book dealer

== See also ==
- Kenny Sanders (born c. 1967), former college basketball player
