= Library-book vandalism =

Intentional damage or defacement of library materials

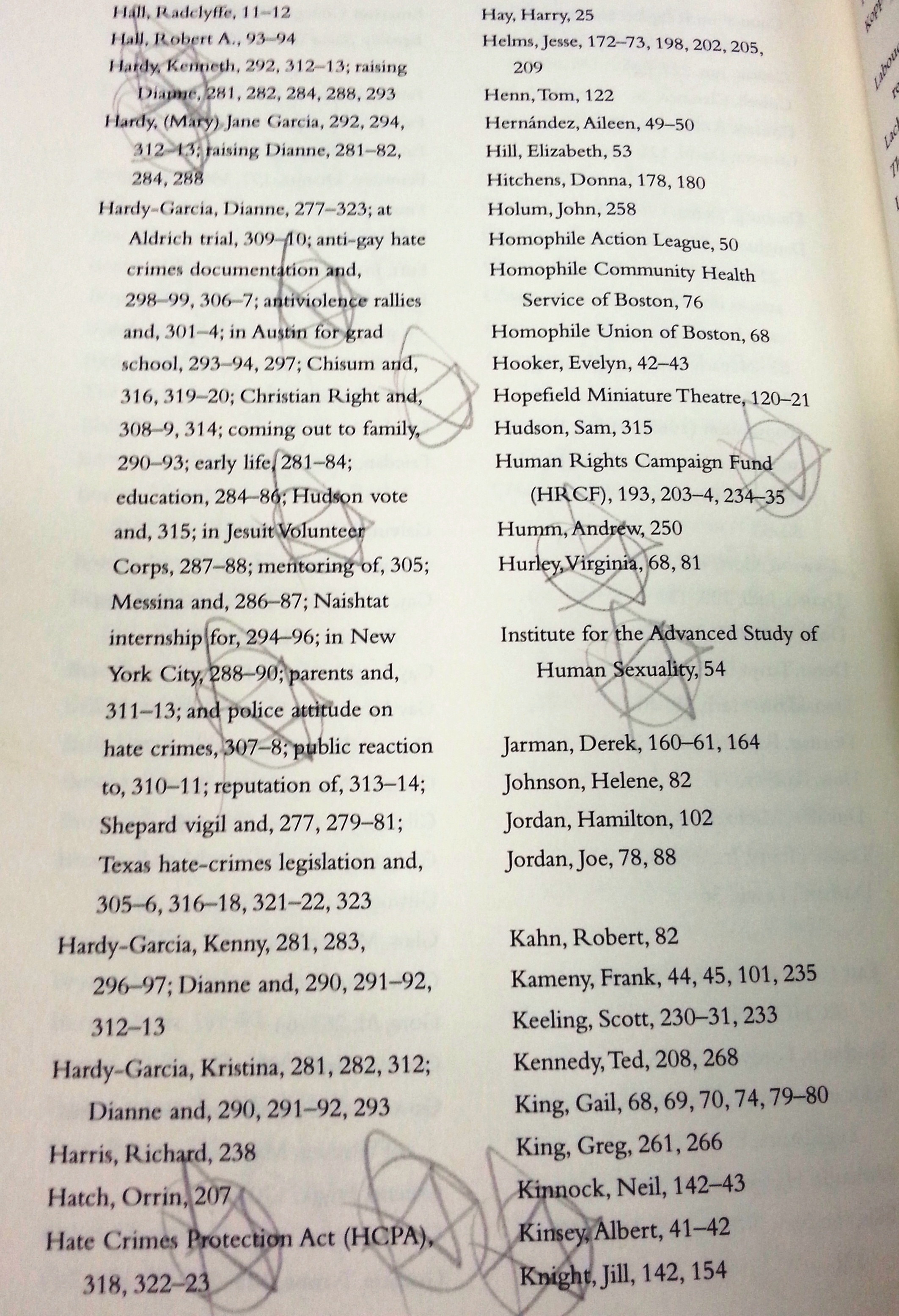
Handwritten vandalism found in a library book's index.

Library-book or -materials vandalism, sometimes termed intentional destruction of books or materials or book or material mutilation is the act of damaging or defacing library books or other library holdings. It is a considerable loss of resources for libraries with high rates of vandalism. As with book theft at libraries, vandalism of books has been studied by a number of library professionals. Librarians consider book vandalism and mutilation a "threat to intellectual property" and have seen it as a "tremendous challenge to the library profession worldwide." Handwriting or marks in and tearing or removal of pages from books can all be forms of vandalism or mutilation. Arson is another form of library book vandalism. The hiding of books within libraries is sometimes considered to be a form of materials vandalism.

== Incidents ==
Book or material vandalism occurs at many different scales and with many different degrees of damage. A three-year study conducting in the early part of the 1980s showed that 64% of American public libraries reported having at least one incident of book vandalism. A later study in Great Britain found that, on average, libraries experienced 9.8 book vandalism events a year.

Sometimes these book-vandalism events reach epidemic levels. The Metro Toronto Library reported in 1975 that within one month over 200 reference books were "torn beyond repair." In 1995, twenty California libraries were plagued by a serial "book slicer", removing pages from modern poetry collections causing over $10,000 in damage to over 200 books. In Decatur, Alabama, 500 children's books were damaged by book slicing, with an estimated cost of $15,000. Other books vandalized by razoring pages in Decatur, included books for adults on coaching children and also on books about sex.

Sometimes a specific book or topic is targeted, in the case of a Tokyo man who tore pages only out of books about Anne Frank in several area libraries.

The issue is by no means just a contemporary one: Book mutilation consisting of removal of maps and pages from encyclopedias was reported by Green County Library in 1918.

Even small, volunteer libraries, like Little Free Library posts have been subject to book mutilation, with one small library in Texas having one book partially burned and the cover torn off another book.

== Efforts to curb library book vandalism ==
=== Electronic systems ===
As electronic book-detection systems became available beginning in the 1970s, libraries began to examine the potential for such systems to prevent library book vandalism and theft. A survey conducted in 1973 of 255 public libraries in the United States found that most libraries had "neither guards nor alarm systems." Public and academic libraries both regularly spend "tens of thousands of dollars" on electronic systems designed to prevent vandalism and theft.

=== Education ===
The State University College at Buffalo launched an effort to stem book vandalism in 1983. The campaign was called a "cold war on vandalism" and involved displays of vandalized books and encouragement of early reporting of all types of book destruction. Students and faculty at the University of Cape Coast advocated for a similar form of education. They suggested displaying mutilated books and for the library to run "educational programmes on the use of the library."

=== Observation ===
The American Library Association (ALA) reports that recent acts of vandalism can help libraries identify the targets of future vandalism. The ALA has recommended additional security measures or relocation of library materials relating to past vandalism. The University of Memphis Library had problems with common reference books missing pages or indexes and therefore chose to move these items behind information desks and implementing a gatekeeper system for use. However, restricting access to books is considered by the library profession as a "limitation of access to information which poses a threat to knowledge pursuit and exchange."

Examining books immediately after use inside the library can help reduce acts of book vandalism.

=== Providing copies ===
Providing access to inexpensive or free copies of materials that are often vandalized has been suggested in order to minimize book mutilations. Some libraries have reduced the amount it costs to make a copy in order to help prevent people from taking the information by removing pages or images from books.

=== Legislation and enforcement of policies ===
ALA has recommended drafting potential legislation relating to vandalism. Staff members in libraries should be trained to enforce laws against vandalism, calling the police if an act of library book vandalism is taking place. Outside of law enforcement, libraries should charge patrons the replacement cost of a damaged (or lost) item, if the identity of the perpetrator is known. Restricting what patrons are allowed to bring into the library can help curb vandalism or theft.

== Explanations for vandalism ==
The population responsible for vandalism varies considerably by library and type of vandalism. A study conducted in Memphis University Libraries revealed that perpetrators of library book vandalism were a diverse group including the general public, students, researchers, academics and library staff themselves. Mutilation of books at university libraries in Ghana were reported to have been significantly carried out (90%) by students. Sometimes children are responsible for vandalism, whether it is intentional or not.

Lack of staff training and support for maintaining books is often tied to high rates of book vandalism. Metro Toronto Library staff felt that their experience in losing over 200 reference books in 1975 to book vandalism was due to the library being understaffed. The Memphis study mentioned above also found that staff could be part of the problem by being "innocent, ignorant or complacent." In addition, the same study found that students using the library felt that security in the library was seen as poor and that students did not know the cost of materials damaged and felt that punishment for being caught would be lenient.

=== Access to information ===
Some libraries describe book vandalism as genuine information seeking behavior. Stanford University's medical library blamed book vandalism on student's need for information. The director of the library, Peter Stangl, said that the most students often wanted the same books, so were stealing the information they needed for classes. In the Memphis study, one of the most relevant reasons for library vandalism was that the books mutilated could not be checked out of the library. A study done at the University of Cape Coast showed that reference books which could not be checked out were the most vandalized books.

Economic reasons can drive library users to mutilation of books. In some African countries, library researchers found that economic depression which may cause libraries to lack multiple copies of popular materials and lack photocopying facilities contributed to mutilation.

On the other side of the issue are those who wish to restrict access to information. In these situations, books have been damaged or destroyed in order to silence an idea or viewpoint an individual or group does not want to see expressed. During times of social crisis, books can become a casualty of those who do not value what is expressed within or by those who are illiterate.

=== Social issues and commentary ===
Other types of vandalism are more closely linked to social or political issues and commentary. Librarian Dennis Hinrichs of Mount Pleasant High School library in Iowa believed that students vandalized books due to a form of self-expression. Portions of magazines and books in the library were marked out so as to be unreadable. The practice was increasing and Hinrichs believed that students were using the "library as a focal point for their frustrations."

Joe Moran, wrote an article for The Guardian about his own "impulse" for writing in the margins of library books. His argument for the practice is historical since he writes that "until the 19th century books were often used as scrap paper, and few people had qualms about scrawling on a pristine copy." Moran traces his book writing (usually in pencil) as part of the tradition of marginalia.

Vandalism can frequently mirror larger social issues: a survey of libraries which subscribed to Playboy magazine found that more than two thirds of the libraries had vandalism issues with that set of materials alone. Some library patrons have a political or religious motivation for book vandalism. In 2002, a San Francisco man was banned from all of the city's public libraries, ordered to undergo counseling and to pay $9,600 to the library due to his vandalism. The man had destroyed hundreds of books relating to LGBT topics by slashing the covers and insides of the books and then reshelving the books "stuffed with Christian pamphlets." In other cases, library materials are destroyed when they represent aspects of a "particular despised group."

=== State-sponsored destruction ===
One of the most destructive groups of people have been communist regimes, which have destroyed library books that do not serve the current power structure. In Soviet Russia, as Joseph Stalin "purged" individuals, all of their writing and research was also destroyed. During the Invasion of Tibet, Chinese communists forced Tibetans to destroy their own books or manuscripts by burning, shredding, mixing with manure or by walking on them. One of the most well-known instances of book burning occurred in Nazi Germany, where Nazis burned books and other writings by those they deemed to be degenerates, including Jews, communists, anarchists, and sexologists. Other totalitarian governments have destroyed various library books because these governments see "reading and research as political acts" which can lead individuals to thoughts that run counter to the government.

== Effects of library-materials vandalism ==
Materials vandalism requires considerable staff time and resources to overcome. Library staff at the University of Cape Coast reported that library material vandalism made it difficult for them to effectively do their job and assist library patrons with information requests. Costs of book vandalism can include replacement costs for general collection items.

In some cases, years of potentially irreplaceable work have been destroyed. In 1969, five thousand library catalog cards were destroyed at the University of Illinois. The cards were found in various states throughout the building and in a residence hall on campus. The destruction was considered by the director of the library as worth over $55,000 and that it would be "almost impossible to reconstruct them."

Cultural heritage can be destroyed through vandalism. In China, a fire set at the Siege of Peking during the Boxer Rebellion in 1900 caused the destruction of the Yongle Encyclopedia and other irreplaceable books. Not only were many of the books housed in the Hanlin Library destroyed by fire, but many of the books not ruined were collected by British soldiers as souvenirs. Because the Yongle Encyclopedia was written out by hand and had no copies, much of the cultural heritage it recorded is lost forever.

== In popular culture ==
Book vandalism or mutilation is often depicted in film. The character of Jake, the private detective in Chinatown (1974), tears the page out of a book because it has information he needs. The Breakfast Club (1985), depicts the character John Bender destroying a book and tossing the pages around the library.

== See also ==
- Book burning
- Joe Orton
- Forbes Smiley
- Library theft
- Book store shoplifting
