= Missing Books Register =

Database of stolen printed books

The Missing Books Register, established by the International League of Antiquarian Booksellers in 2012 as the Stolen Books Database, is a registry of valuable and/or historically significant books that allows libraries and antiquarian book dealers to track purloined or missing materials. It tracks works stolen or lost after 15 June 2010. Recent additions to the register include early editions of the Russian nationalist poet Alexander Pushkin that were systematically stolen from European regional and academic libraries beginning in 2022.

== See also ==
- Library theft
