= FWN =

FWN may refer to:

- Fund for Wild Nature, non-governmental organization working for the preservation of wild nature
- Favourite Worst Nightmare, album by Sheffield indie rock band Arctic Monkeys
- Sussex Airport (New Jersey), small general aviation airport located in Sussex, New Jersey, United States
- Friedrich Wilhelm Nietzsche, philosopher
