= The Derryfield School =

Independent school in Manchester, New Hampshire, USA

Coordinates: 43°02′06″N 71°27′32″W

- 2108 River Road; Manchester, NH 03104; United States

Information
- Type: Independent
- Established: 1964
- Head of school: Andy Chappell
- Faculty: 50 full-time, 6 part-time
- Enrollment: 402 (2022-23)
- Mascot: Moose the Cougar
- Endowment: $9 million
- Information: (603) 669-4524
- Website: www.derryfield.org

The Derryfield School is an independent college preparatory high school and middle school located in Manchester, New Hampshire, United States. It is a day school serving grades 6–12.

== History ==
In the early 1960s, a group of 39 Manchester families came together to establish a new school, focused on educating the "whole child" like a boarding school; however, it would be a day school, allowing for family involvement in students' daily lives. The school was incorporated in July 1964, and in the fall of 1965, the Derryfield School opened its doors, with 108 students in grades 7–10, and 11 faculty members. The first headmaster was one of the founders, R. Phillip Hugny. Grades 11 and 12 were added in the two successive years as the original tenth-grade students advanced; the first commencement was held in 1968. Grade 6 was added in 1999.

While naturally focusing on academics, the founders also wanted students to be well-rounded, civic-minded individuals, able to make a positive difference in their community. So, from the school's beginnings, additional emphasis was placed on the arts, athletics, and community service.

The school spent its first year and a half in the Boys Club in downtown Manchester. In February 1967, the first buildings of its new campus were completed on River Road, north of downtown, and the school relocated there.

Since then, the school has grown to almost 400 students in seven grades and a faculty and staff of more than 80. The campus has continued to expand to meet the requirements of the growing student body and education in the 21st century. The focus on educating the whole child has not changed, however. Alongside the academic program, athletics, the arts, and community service continue to be the foundation of a Derryfield education.

== Leadership ==
The Derryfield School is governed by a Board of Trustees, composed of fiduciaries who steer the course of the school by managing finances and initiatives on the part of the school. The Board of Trustees is primarily dedicated to ensuring that the Derryfield School "has adequate resources to advance its mission." The head of school of the Derryfield School is a member of the Board who is responsible for ensuring that the academic curriculum meets the standards of the community and encouraging a positive academic environment.

The middle school and upper school each have a Division Head, referred to as 'Head of Middle School' (6-8) and 'Head of Upper School' (9-12), respectively. They are each responsible for all academics within those grades. There are two Assistant Heads. One is in charge of external affairs, and the other is in charge of academic affairs.

- Board of Trustees: Lauren Hines, Andy Chappell, Susan Rand-King, Sally Green, Dr. Sheila DeWitt, Steve Carter, Neal Winneg, Bill Kelsey, Dr. Karen Wu, Dr. Sal Malik, Harold Losey, Lisa Drake, Dr. Cecilia Clemans, Dr. Saurabh Ullal, Richard Critz, James Lamp, Bob Grunbeck, Brent Powell, Joel Rozen, and Dr. Steve Johnson
- Head of Upper School: Laurie Byron
- Head of Middle School: Mark Blaisdell
- Assistant Head for Academic Affairs: Pete Brandt
- Assistant Head of External Affairs: Kathleen Rutty-Fey

== Academics ==
As of the 2025-2026 school year, both the Upper and Middle school follow and 8-day block schedule. The Upper School's academic day is between 8:00 am to 3:00 pm, whilst the Middle School's is between 7:50 am to 2:25 pm. Both the Middle School and Upper School contain English, Mathematics, Science, STEM, World Language, History, and 'Leadership, Ethics & Development (LEAD)' programs.

== Campus ==
The original 10-acre (4.0 ha) parcel of land on which the school buildings sit was bought from the Morrison family in 1965. Construction of the first campus buildings began immediately, and the school moved into its new facilities in February 1967.

As the student body grew, numerous campaigns were launched to expand the school's facilities. The first, in 1973, financed the construction of the Center for Student Activities – becoming the gymnasium which, at the time, also served as an auditorium. In 1981, a connector from the academic building to the gym was built to house the school's library, administrative offices, and a student forum. A performing arts theater was completed in 1988, and a new middle school building was added in 1999. The Gateway Building, completed in 2010, contains the admission, development, alumni, and business offices, as well as the offices of Breakthrough Manchester.

The grounds were expanded in 1996, when the school acquired 72 acres (29 ha) of land, adjacent to its original parcel, from New Hampshire College (now Southern New Hampshire University). The school used this additional acreage to build six new athletic fields and a cross-country running course, allowing for the continued expansion of its athletic offerings.

The Turf Field, Derryfield's premier artificial surface athletic field, was built in 2008, with floodlights added in 2009. Drainage and special snow-blowing equipment make it ready to use in or after almost any weather situation. Derryfield's soccer, field hockey and lacrosse teams use it regularly, and the baseball and softball teams use it for practice when their grass fields are unplayable. The field is also used by outside clubs and teams, either for regular rental, or in the early spring, when their own grass fields may be still frozen or under water.

The construction of a new Athletic and Wellness Center was completed in November 2019. The new building is located on top of the land where the tennis courts used to be, across from the building with the old gym. A new Science and Innovation Center was also completed in 2019 in the space of the old gymnasium and its locker rooms. It contains wet and dry labs, a makerspace, robotics lab, inspiration lounge, and an audio/video production studio.

Construction of a new 11,800-square-foot (1,100 square meters) dining hall named the Matarese Commons was completed in 2023. The Matarese Commons was built into the Athletic & Wellness Center, filling the space between the center and the main school building.

== Athletics ==
Derryfield offers an interscholastic athletic and physical activity program on several levels, competing in numerous sports in both the Middle and Upper Schools during all three seasons. The Middle School teams compete in the Tri-County League, with teams from New Hampshire's Merrimack, Hillsborough and Rockingham counties. The Upper School is a New Hampshire Interscholastic Athletic Association Division IV member school, although some sports, such as tennis, lacrosse, and field hockey, compete in higher divisions, due to the team's record of success. There are also opportunities to participate in non-team and independent sports in both the Middle and Upper Schools.

Every student in grades 7–12 is required to participate in two seasons of physical activity each year. Missing a practice or a game is considered as serious as missing a class. Failure to complete the physical activity requirement will jeopardize graduation.

=== Sports offerings ===
==== Middle school ====
- Soccer (boys & girls)
- Field hockey (girls)
- Cross-country and Track (boys & girls)
- Alpine and Nordic skiing (boys & girls)
- Basketball (boys & girls)
- Strength training (boys & girls)
- Baseball (boys)
- Lacrosse (boys & girls)
- Tennis (boys & girls)

==== Upper school ====
(championships prior to 2000 not listed)

- Soccer (boys & girls) boys: state champs 2001, 2002, 2009, 2012–2015; girls: state champs 2000, 2001, 2005, 2008–2010, 2014, 2015
- Field hockey (girls) D-II, state champs 2007, 2010–2013, 2018
- Cross country (boys & girls)
- Golf (co-ed) D-III, state champs 1999, 2002–2005, 2012–2013, 2017, 2019
- Crew (boys & girls)
- Basketball (boys & girls)
- Alpine and Nordic skiing (boys & girls) boys' alpine: state champs 2010, 2014, 2016, 2023
- Strength training (boys & girls)
- Swimming (co-ed)
- Hockey (co-ed) D-II first season 2014–2015
- Baseball (boys) state champs 2003
- Softball (girls) [currently not offered]
- Tennis (boys & girls) boys: D-I, state champs 2003–2009, 2014; girls: D-I, state champs 2000, 2006, 2008–2010, 2024-2026
- Lacrosse (boys & girls) boys: D-II, state champs 2010, 2013, 2016, 2017, 2018, 2019, 2023; girls: D-III, state champs 2014, 2021
- Track & field (co-ed)
- Equestrian (co-ed)
- Yoga (co-ed)

In both middle and upper school, students have the option to participate in what is called an Independent Sport. This means that to fulfill one of two yearly sports requirements, students may count a sport or activity they participate in outside of school. They must log the same amount of hours per week as a Derryfield sport, and it must be signed off by a supervisor. Only one independent sport is allowed per academic year.

== Explorations ==
Both the middle and upper school contain a rotating group of student-led clubs named 'explorations'. Fields that are not contained within the school's curriculum are likely contained in a dedicated exploration, such as Robotics. Many are exclusive to either the upper or middle school, whilst the most popular are accessible to both. Most explorations are organized exclusively during dedicated exploration periods, while others, like Model UN and Robotics, have regular events outside of the school day and campus. Exploration blocks last for one term, but students are often encouraged to register for the same exploration consecutively. Also known as 'explorations', the upper school offers optional teacher-led elective courses which focus on specialized fields not otherwise covered in the academic cirriculum. Exploration courses encompass a full class period, whereas exploration blocks are often limited to half a class period.

== Notable alumni ==
- Gary Hirshberg (born 1954) Class of 1972, president of Stonyfield Farm yogurt company
- John D. Robinson (born 1968) Class of 1986, disability advocate, CEO of Our Ability, Inc.
- Sarah Silverman (born 1970) Class of 1989, comedian, actress
- Forbes Smiley (born 1956), convicted map thief
- David B. Snow Jr. (born 1954) Class of 1972, former CEO of Medco Health Solutions
