= Vandalism =

Deliberate damage or defacement of an object or structure

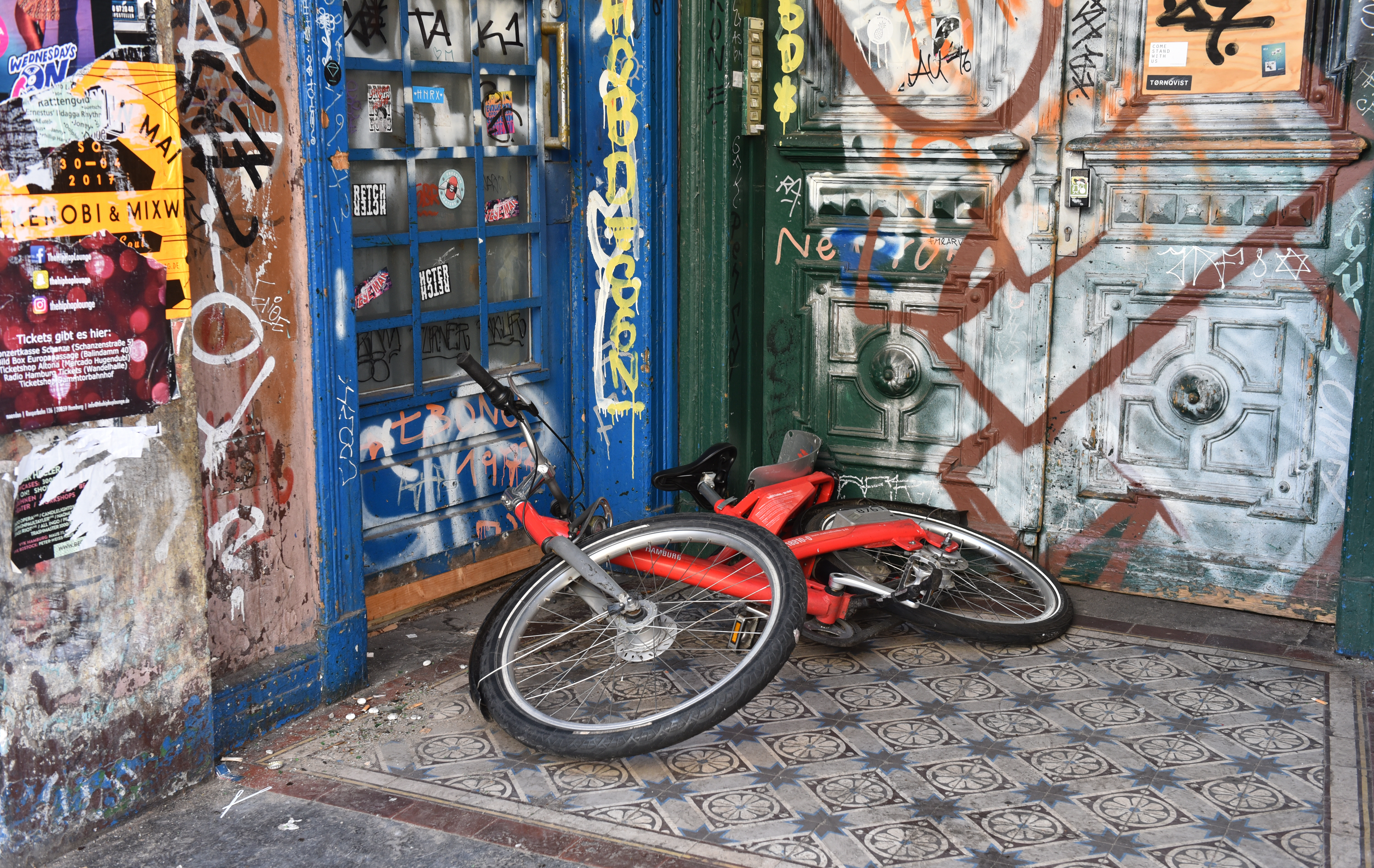
Vandalised façade and bicycle in Hamburg, Germany

Vandalism is the action involving deliberate destruction of or damage to public or private property.

The term includes property damage, such as graffiti and defacement directed towards any property without permission of the owner. The term finds its roots in an Enlightenment view that the Germanic Vandals were a uniquely destructive people, as they sacked Rome in 455 AD.

== Etymology ==
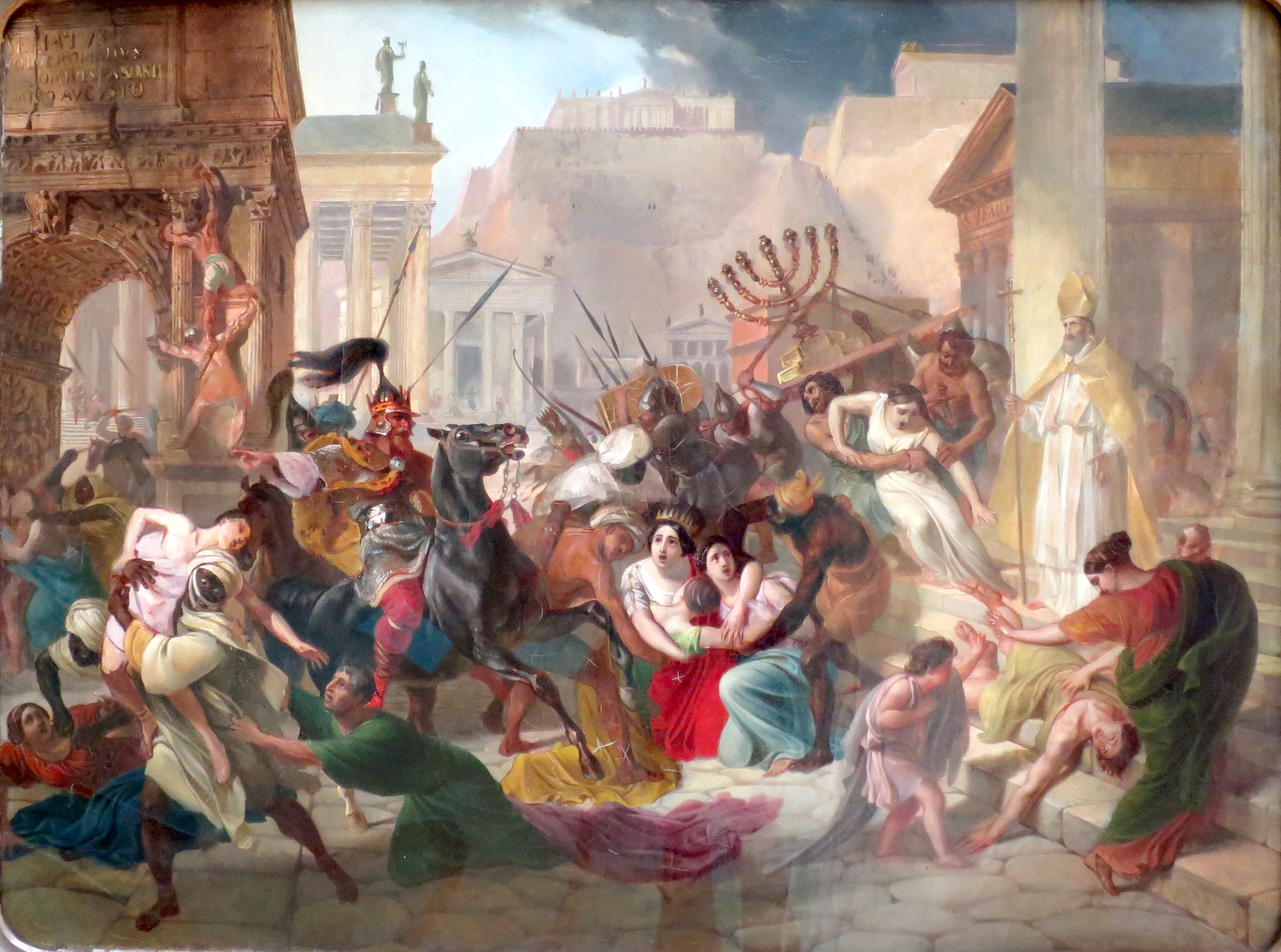
The Vandals sacking Rome in 455 AD, painted by Karl Bryullov c. 1830

The Vandals, an ancient Germanic people, are associated with senseless destruction as a result of their sack of Rome under King Genseric in 455. During the Enlightenment, Rome was idealized, while the Goths and Vandals were blamed for its destruction. The Vandals may not have been any more destructive than other invaders of ancient times, but they did inspire English poet John Dryden to write, Till Goths, and Vandals, a rude Northern race, Did all the matchless Monuments deface (1694). However, the Vandals did intentionally damage statues, which may be why their name is associated with the vandalism of art. The term Vandalisme was coined in 1794 by Henri Grégoire, bishop of Blois, to describe the destruction of artwork following the French Revolution. The term was quickly adopted across Europe. This new use of the term was important in colouring the perception of the Vandals from later Late Antiquity, popularizing the pre-existing idea that they were a barbaric group with a taste for destruction.

Historically, vandalism has been justified by painter Gustave Courbet as destruction of monuments symbolizing "war and conquest". Therefore, it is often done as an expression of contempt, creativity, or both. Courbet's attempt, during the 1871 Paris Commune, to dismantle the Vendôme column, a symbol of the past Napoleon III authoritarian Empire, was one of the most celebrated events of vandalism. Nietzsche himself would meditate after the Commune on the "fight against culture", taking as example the intentional burning of the Tuileries Palace on 23 May 1871. "The criminal fight against culture is only the reverse side of a criminal culture" wrote Klossowski after quoting Nietzsche.

In a proposal to the International Conference for Unification of Criminal Law held in Madrid in 1933, Raphael Lemkin envisaged the creation of two new international crimes (delicta juris gentium): the crime of barbarity, consisting in the extermination of racial, religious, or social collectivities, and the crime of vandalism, consisting in the destruction of cultural and artistic works of these groups. The proposal was not accepted. A figurative accusation of vandalism was applied towards the theology of Marcion of Sinope.

== As a crime ==
Private citizens commit vandalism when they willfully damage or deface the property of others or the commons. Some vandalism may qualify as culture jamming or sniggling: it is thought by some to be artistic in nature even though carried out illegally or without the property owner's permission. Examples include at least some graffiti art, billboard "liberation", and possibly crop circles. Criminal vandalism takes many forms. Graffiti on public property is common in many inner cities as part of a gang culture, where they might be used as territorial markers.

More serious forms of vandalism that may take place during public unrest such as rioting can involve the willful destruction of public and private property. Vandalism per se is sometimes considered one of the less serious common crimes, but it can become quite serious and distressing when committed extensively, violently, or as an expression of hatred and intimidation.

=== Examples ===
Examples of vandalism include salting lawns, cutting trees without permission, egg throwing, breaking windows, arson, spraying paint on others' properties, tagging, placing glue into locks, tire slashing, keying (scratching) paint, ransacking a property, flooding a house by clogging a sink and leaving the water running, and pulling up plants from the roots without permission.

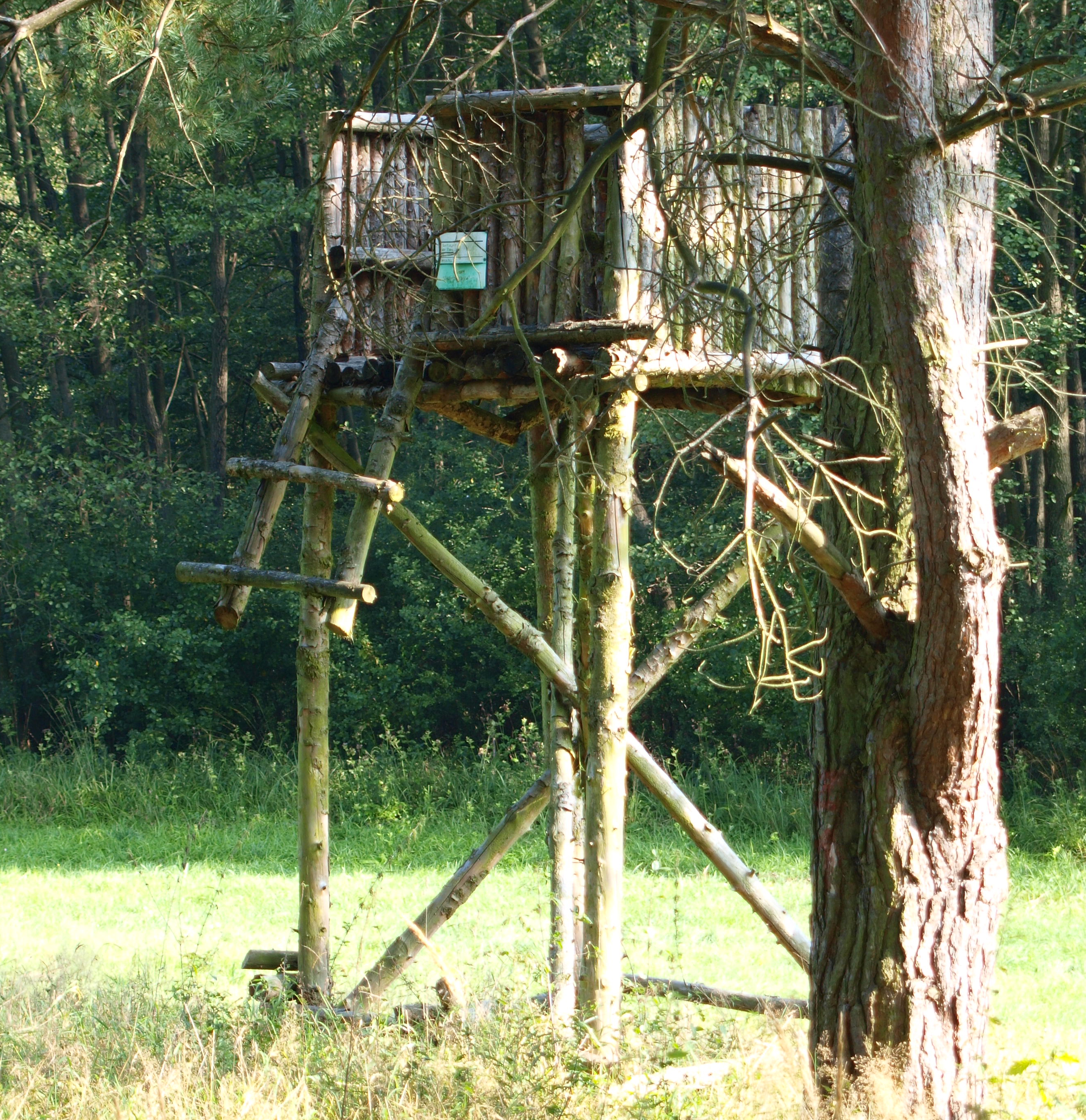
Vandalized ladder stand in Germany

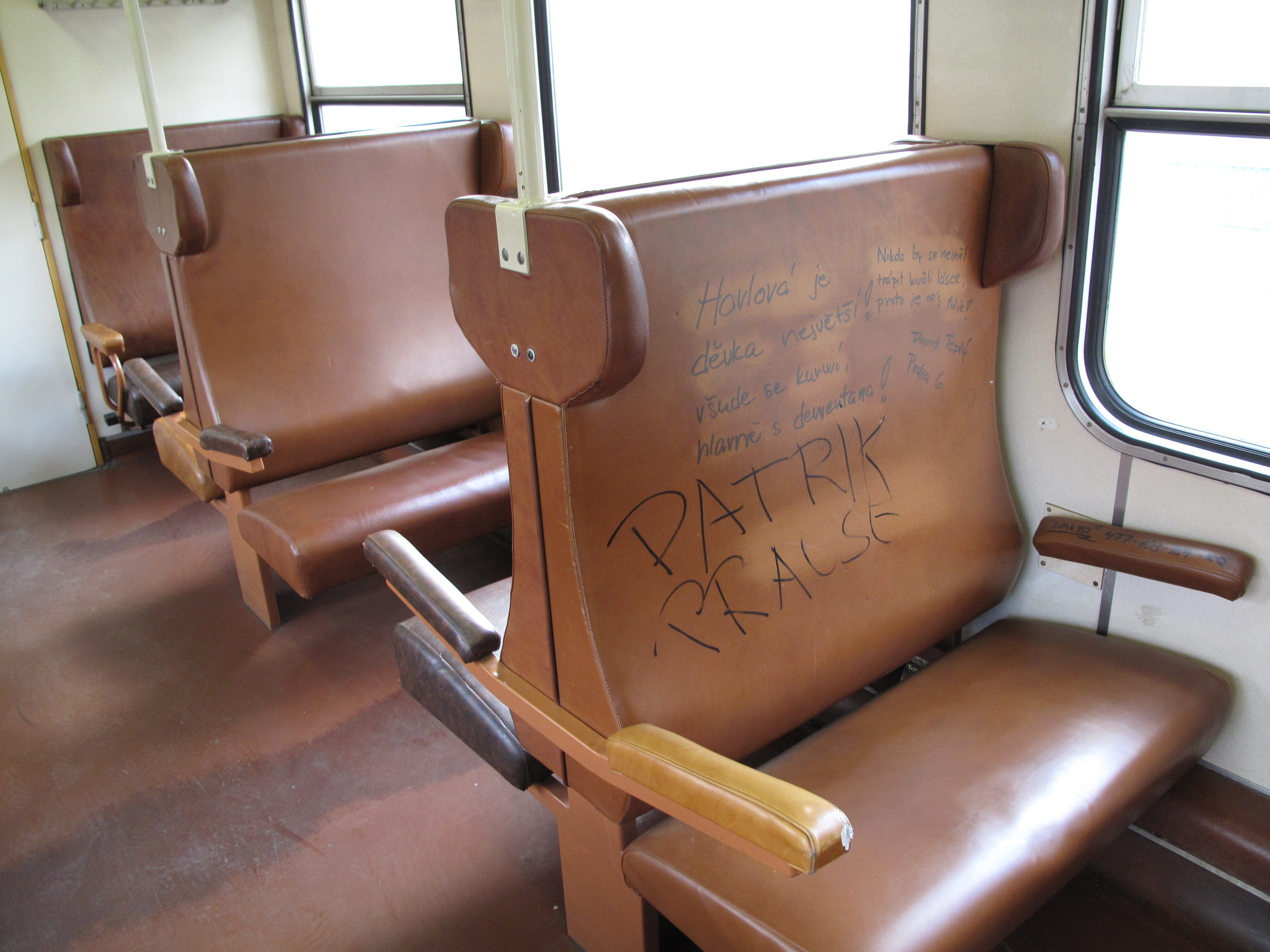
Vandalized seat inside a passenger car on a train in the Czech Republic

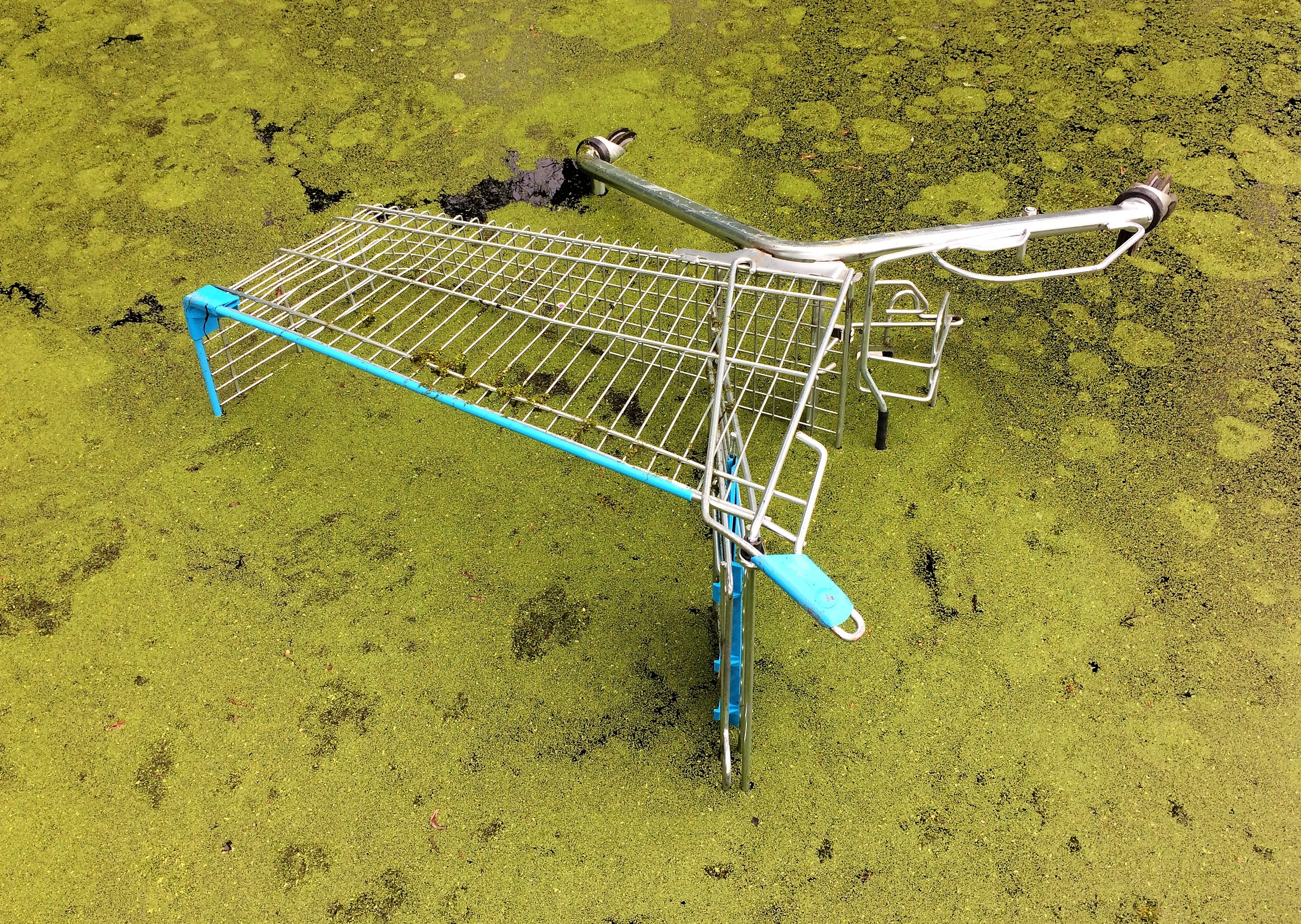
A broken shopping cart, thrown into a waterway, Netherlands

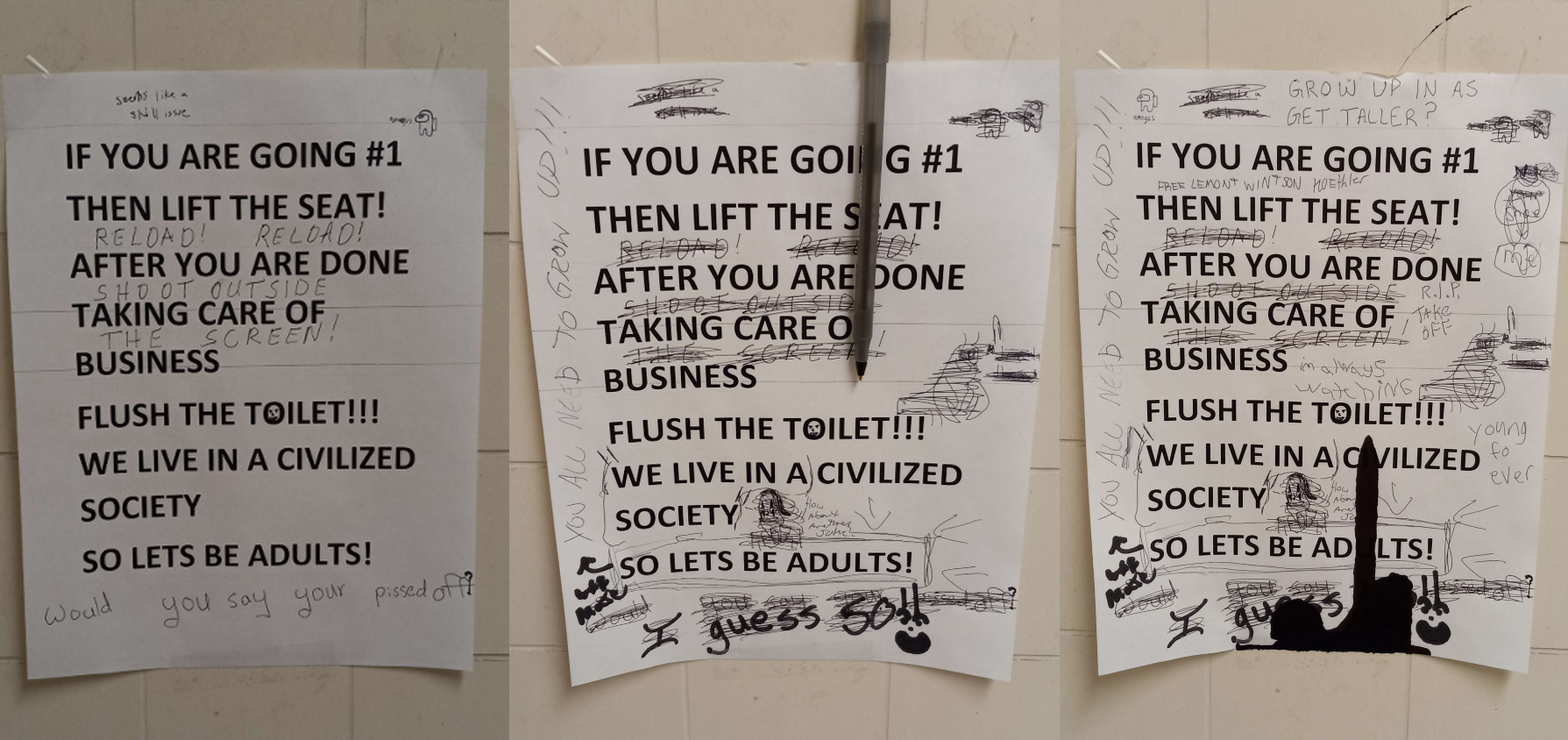
Progression of vandalism as seen in a men's employee bathroom at a grocery store

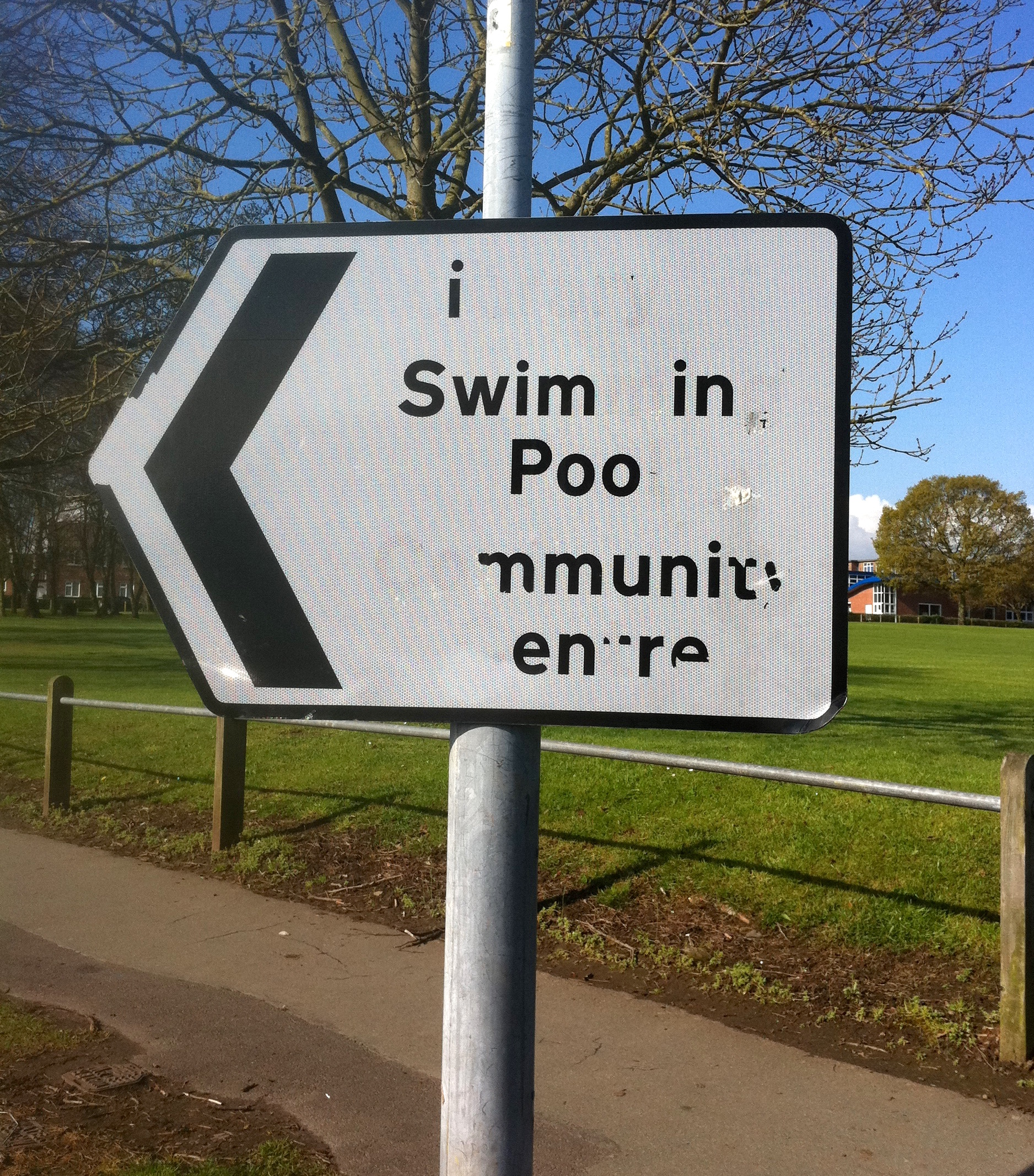
Vandalism on a street sign, making it read
"I
Swim in
Poo
nmunit
en re"

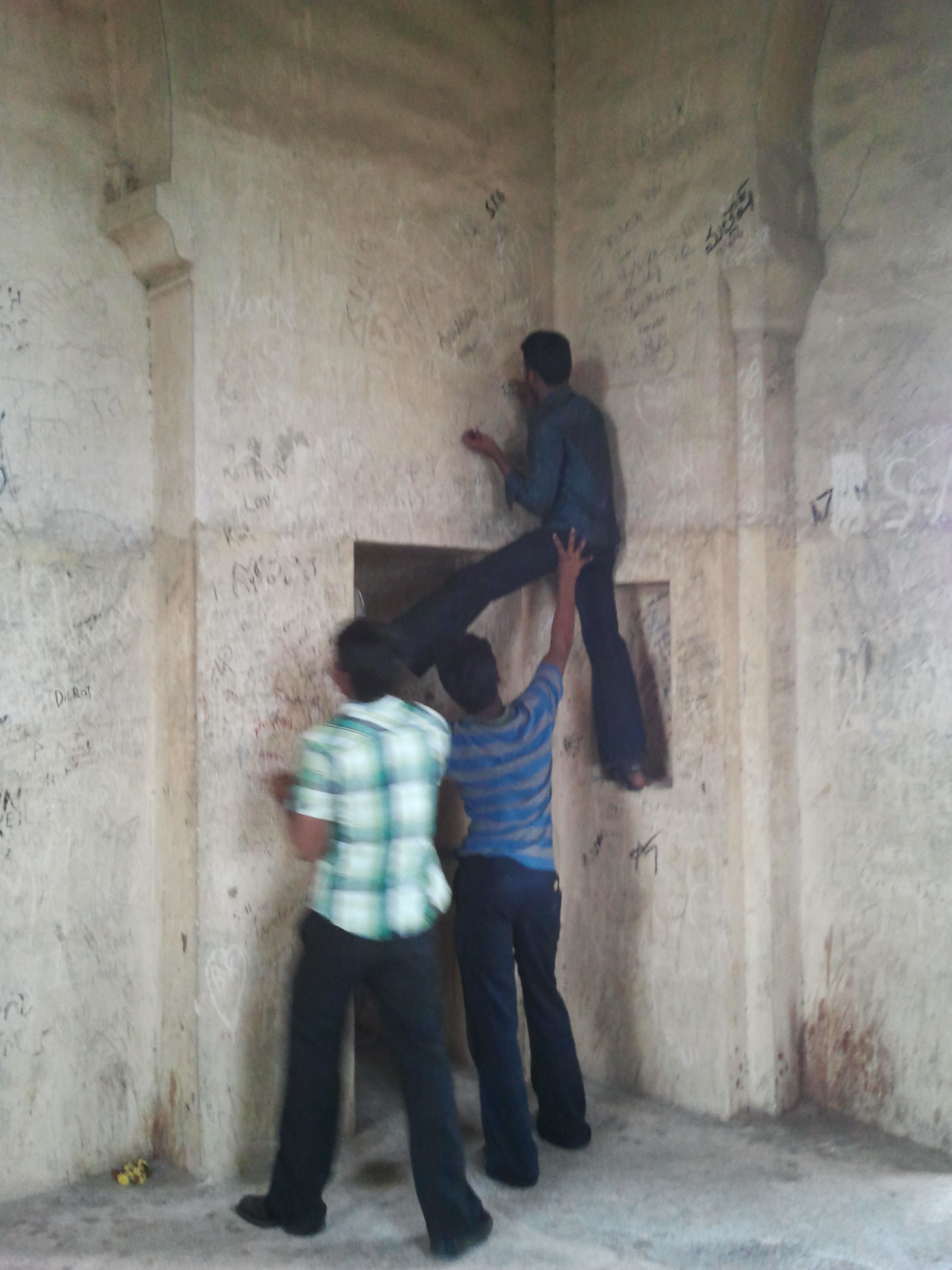
People defacing the walls of the Golconda Fort in Hyderabad, India

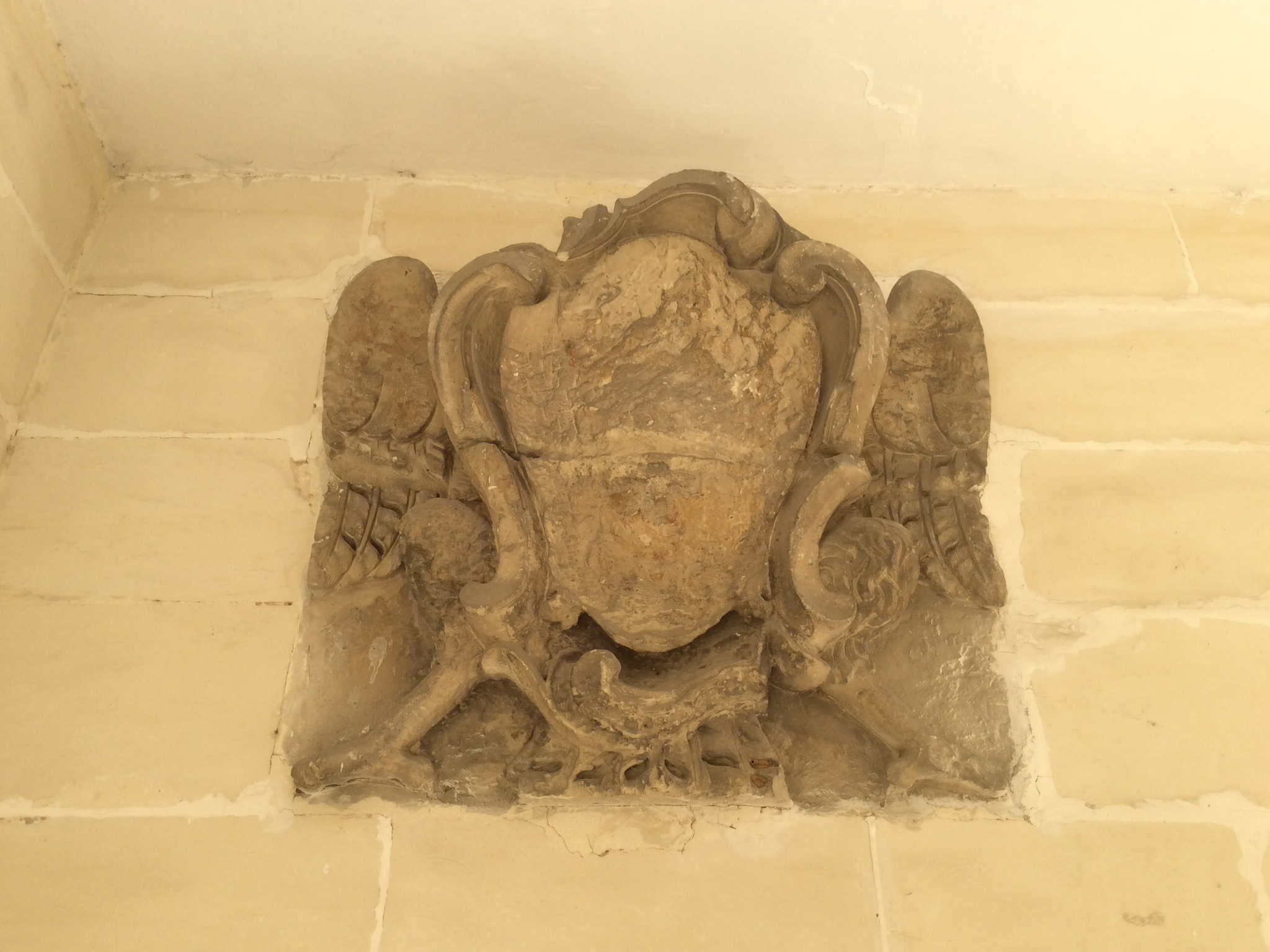
Defaced coat of arms (probably of Emmanuel de Rohan-Polduc) in Santa Venera, Malta

=== Political ===
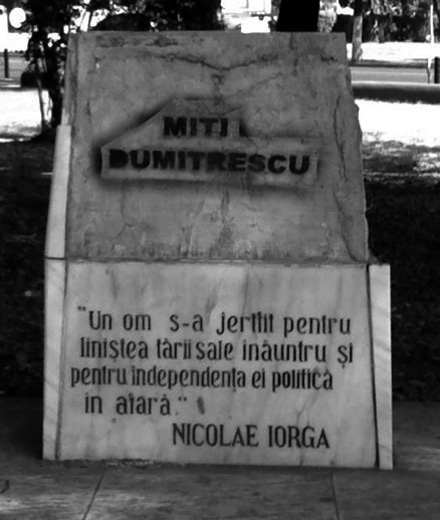
Armand Călinescu's memorial with the bronze plaque stolen and the name of the assassin written over

In elections, opposing candidates' supporters may engage in "political vandalism"—the act of defacing opponents' political posters, bumper stickers, billboards, and other street marketing material. Although the nature of this material is temporary, its effect can be long-lasting as it may reflect both negatively and positively on the candidate whose material is being vandalized as well as on the presumed candidate whose supporters are engaging in the vandalism.

In addition, activists may use the tactic of property destruction as means of protest, e.g. by smashing the windows of banks, shops and government institutions and setting fire to cars. This often takes place during riots but can also happen as a stand-alone event, e.g. by animal rights activists destroying property owned by farmers, hunters, biotech companies, and research facilities and setting free animals (which is sometimes referred to as eco-terrorism by opponents). Vandalism is also a common tactic of black blocs.

=== Motives ===
Actions of this kind can be ascribed to anger or envy, or to spontaneous, opportunistic behaviour, possibly for peer acceptance or bravado in gang cultures, or disgruntlement with the target (victim) person or society. Another common motive is to seek attention, and for personal gain. Opportunistic vandalism of this nature may also be filmed, the mentality of which can be akin to happy slapping. The large-scale prevalence of gang graffiti in some inner cities has almost made it acceptable to the societies based there, so much so that it may go unnoticed, or not be removed, possibly because it may be a fruitless endeavour, to be graffitied on once again. Greed can motivate vandalism as can some political ideologies, wish to draw attention to problems, frustration, even playfulness. Youngsters, the most common vandals, frequently experience low status and boredom. Vandalism enables powerless people to attack those above them, take control and frighten others. Unpunished vandalism can provide relief which reinforces the behaviour. Vandalism by one person can lead to imitation. Teenage boys and men in their 20s are most likely to vandalize, but older adults and females are also known to sometimes vandalize, with young children occasionally vandalizing, but in a much smaller form, such as making small crayon drawings on walls. Criminological research into vandalism has found that it serves many purposes for those who engage in it and stems from a variety of motives. Sociologist Stanley Cohen describes seven different types of vandalism:

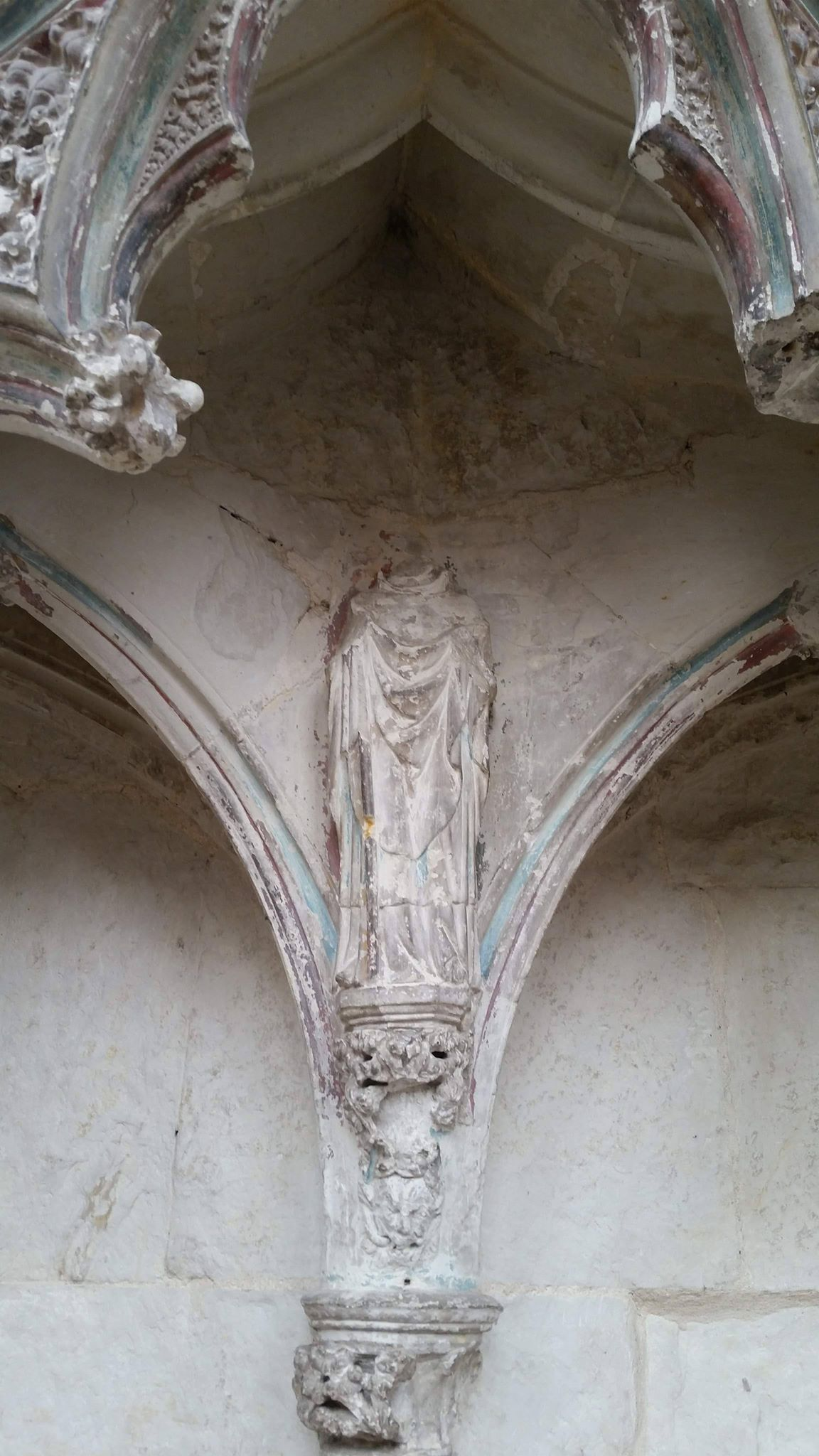
Headless statue in Ely Cathedral; ideological vandalism during the English Reformation

1. Acquisitive vandalism (looting and petty theft).
2. Peer pressure – Teenagers spend more time away from home with peers, and whether they act constructively or destructively can depend on the contacts they make. Disobeying authority can appear cool.
3. Tactical vandalism (to advance some end other than acquiring money or property – such as breaking a window to be arrested and get a bed for the night in a police cell).
4. Ideological vandalism (carried out to further an explicit ideological cause or deliver a message).
5. Vindictive vandalism (for revenge).
6. Play vandalism (damage resulting from children's games).
7. Malicious vandalism (damage caused by a violent outpouring of diffuse frustration and rage that often occurs in public settings). Cohen's original typology was improved upon by Mike Sutton whose research led him to add a seventh sub-type of vandalism – Peer Status Motivated Vandalism.

=== Reaction of authorities ===
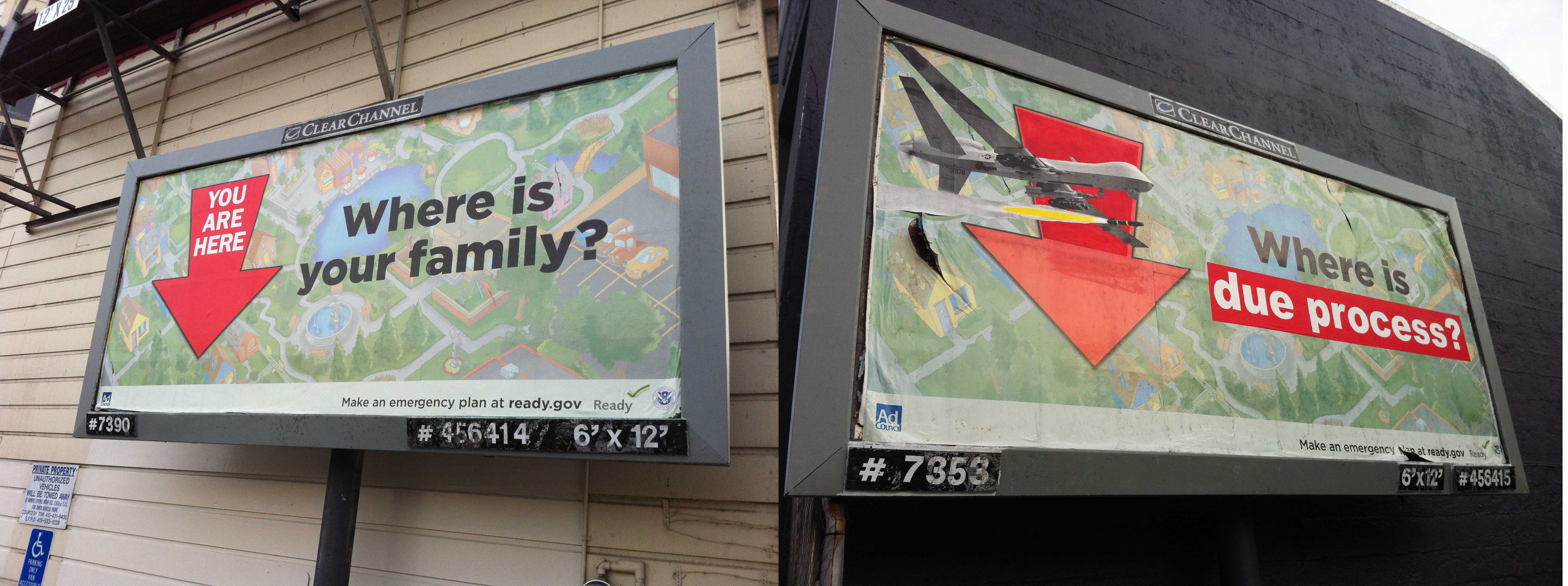
Two billboards with the same original content, the billboard on the right being an example of subvertising—vandalizing with a political message

In view of its incivility, punishment for vandalism can be particularly severe in some countries. In Singapore, for example, a person who attempts to cause or commits an act of vandalism may be liable to a fine of S$2,000 (US$1,492.54) and imprisonment for up to three years and male offencers may also be punished with caning. Vandalism in the UK is construed as an environmental crime and may be punished with an ASBO (Anti-Social Behaviour Order).

In the 1990s, former New York City mayor Rudolph Giuliani cracked down on "quality of life crimes", including graffiti. NY Parks Commissioner Henry J. Stern described graffiti as "a metaphor for urban decay perhaps best shown in 'A Clockwork Orange'" adding that "New York City will not be like that".

=== Cybervandalism ===
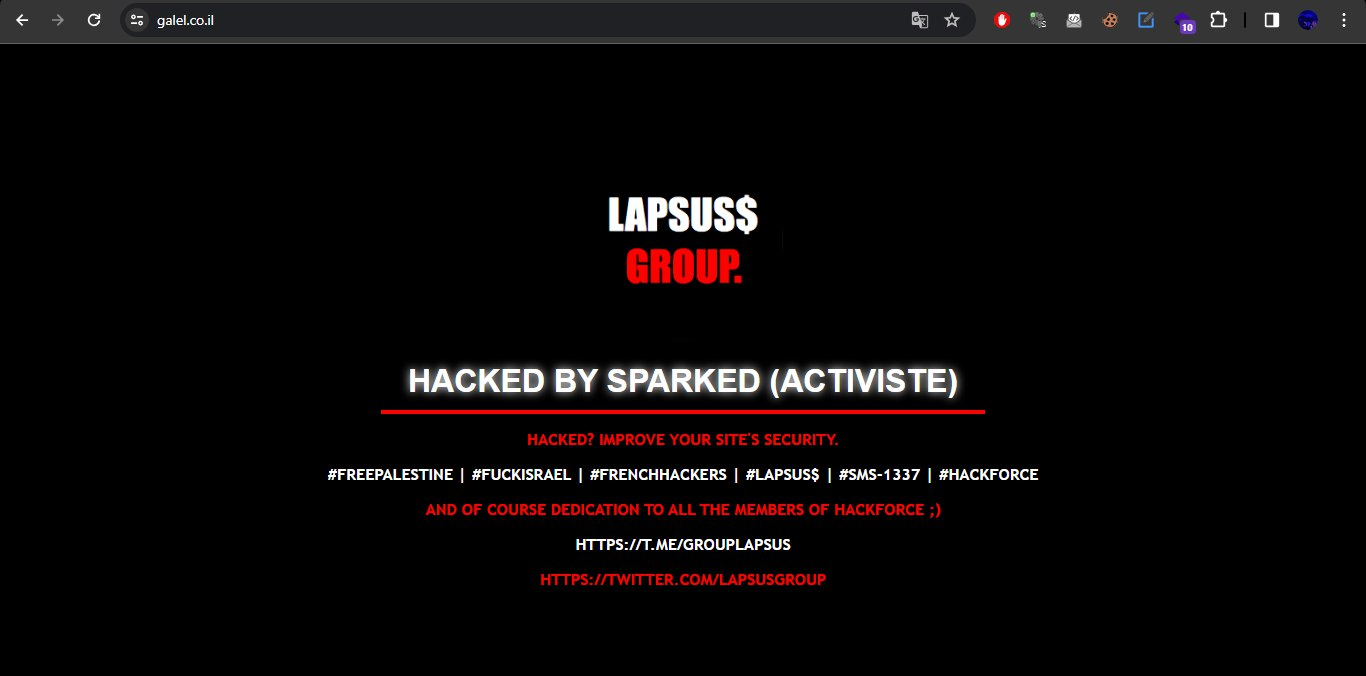
A website defaced by the Lapsus$ hacker group

Cybervandalism is vandalism on the internet, most commonly website defacement. Certain kinds of malware that have no financial intent may also be considered cybervandalism.

Vandalism of the online encyclopedia Wikipedia involves the addition of humorous, nonsensical, offensive or false content to articles.

Vandalism on web maps has been called "cartographic vandalism".

=== Defacement ===
Defacement is a type of vandalism that involves damaging the appearance or surface of something. The object of damage may be architecture, books, paintings, sculpture, or other forms of art.

Examples of defacement include:

- Marking or removing the part of an object (especially images, be they on the page, in illustrative art or as a sculpture) designed to hold the viewers' attention
- Scoring a book cover with a blade
- Splashing paint over a painting in a gallery
- Smashing the nose of a sculpted bust
- Damaging or chiselling off sculpted coats of arms
- Altering the content of web sites and publicly editable repositories to include nonsensical or whimsical references

Iconoclasm led to the defacement of many religious artworks.

== As art ==
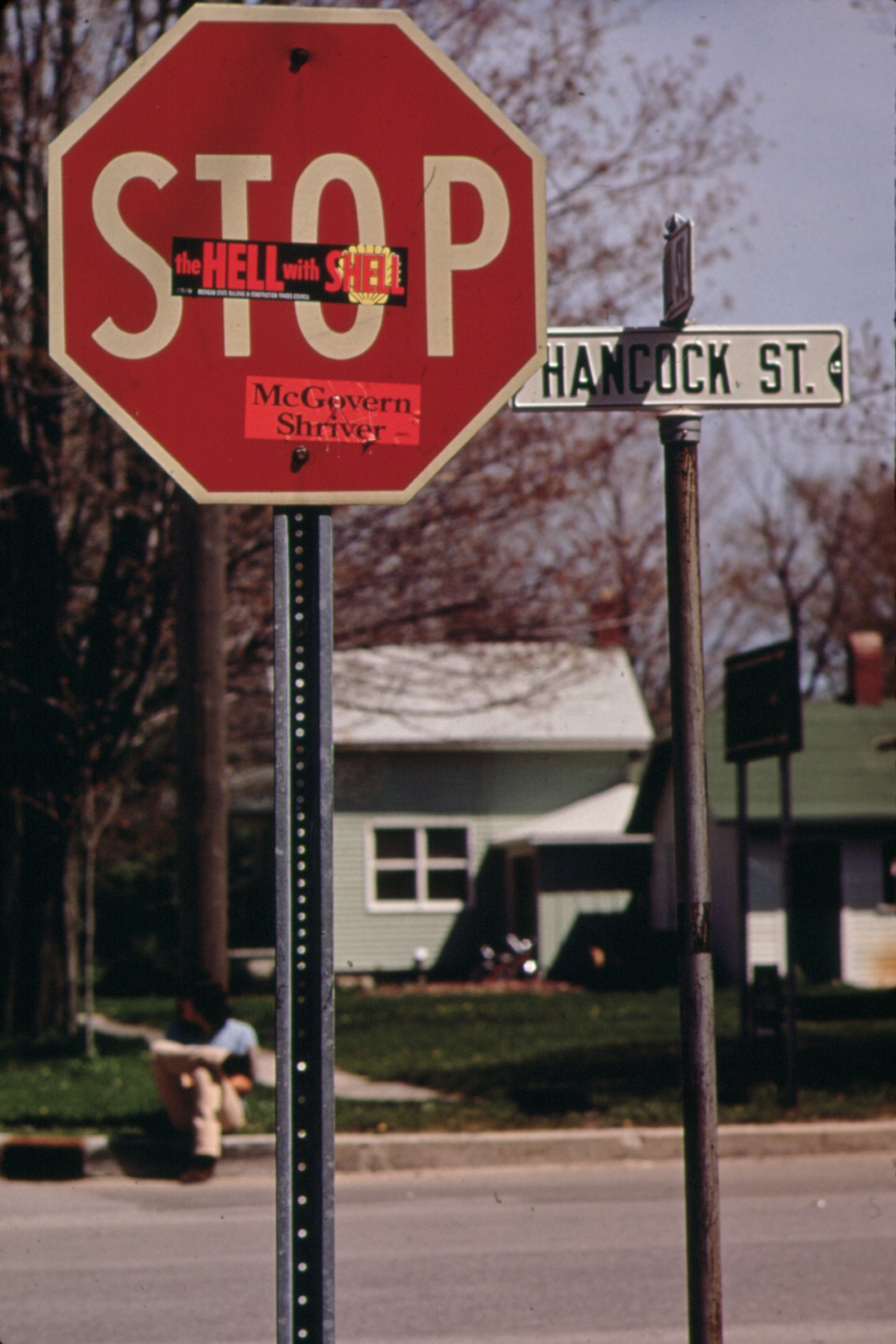
A sticker reading "the HELL with SHELL" photographed in Michigan in 1973

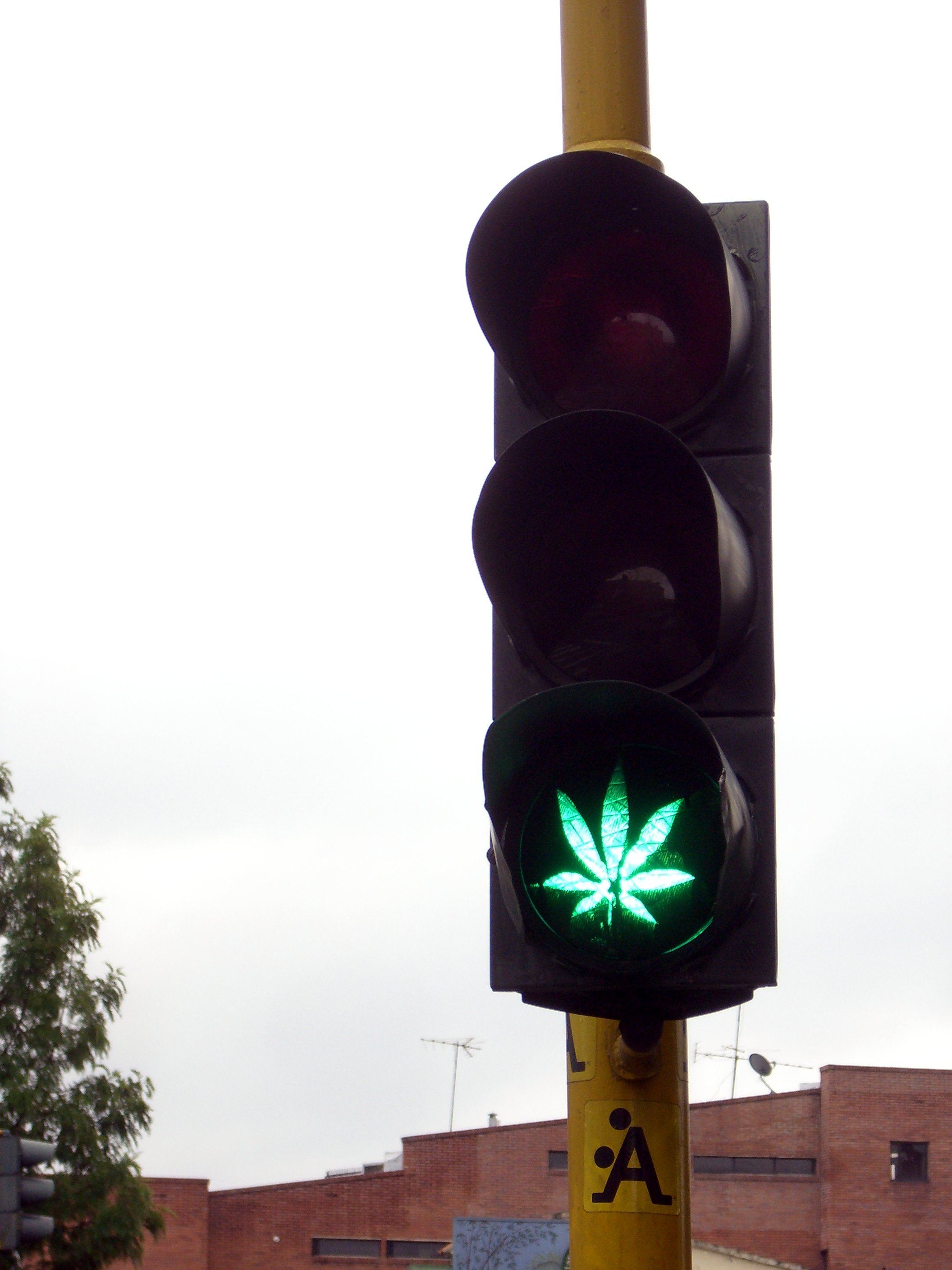
Traffic signal light vandalism portraying the leaf of the cannabis plant in Bogotá, Colombia

Though vandalism in itself is illegal, it is often also an integral part of modern popular culture. French painter Gustave Courbet's attempt to disassemble the Vendôme column during the 1871 Paris Commune was probably one of the first artistic acts of vandalism, celebrated at least since Dada performances during World War I. The Vendôme column was considered a symbol of the recently deposed Second Empire of Napoleon III, and dismantled as such.

After the burning of the Tuileries Palace on 23 May 1871, Philosopher Friedrich Nietzsche himself meditated about the "fight against culture", wondering what could justify culture if it were to be destroyed in such a "senseless" manner (the arguments are: culture is justified by works of art and scientific achievements; exploitation is necessary to those achievements, leading to the creation of exploited people who then fight against culture. In this case, culture cannot be legitimised by art achievements, and Nietzsche writes: "I {also} know what it means: fighting against culture". After quoting him, Klossowski writes: "The criminal fight against culture is only the reverse side of a criminal culture".

As destruction of monument, vandalism can only have sense in a culture respecting history, archeology: Nietzsche spoke of monumental history. As destruction of monumental history, vandalism was assured a long life (as Herostratus proved): Performance art could make such a claim, as well as Hakim Bey's poetic terrorism or Destroy 2000 Years of Culture from Atari Teenage Riot. Gustave Courbet's declaration stated:

Attendu que la colonne Vendôme est un monument dénué de toute valeur artistique, tendant à perpétuer par son expression les idées de guerre et de conquête qui étaient dans la dynastie impériale, mais que réprouve le sentiment d'une nation républicaine, [le citoyen Courbet] émet le vœu que le gouvernement de la Défense nationale veuille bien l'autoriser à déboulonner cette colonne.

('As the Vendôme column is a monument devoid of any artistic value, whose expression tends to perpetuate the ideas of war and conquest from the imperial dynasty, but that reject the sentiment of a republican nation, citizen Courbet declares that the government of National Defense should allow him to dismantle this column.)

Hence, painter Courbet justified the dismantlement of the Vendôme column on political grounds, downgrading its artistic value. Vandalism poses the problem of the value of art compared to life's hardships: Courbet thought that the political values transmitted by this work of art neutralized its artistic value. His project was not followed; however, on 12 April 1871, the Commune voted to dismantle the imperial symbol, and the column was taken down on 8 May. After the assault on the Paris Commune by Adolphe Thiers, Gustave Courbet was condemned to pay part of the expenses.

In 1974, Norman Mailer glorified the art of vandalism in his essay "The Faith of Graffiti", which likened tagging in New York City to the work of Giotto and Rauschenberg. New York Authorities responded by coating subway walls with Teflon paint, jailing taggers and requiring hardware stores to keep spray paint under lock and key.

Tags, designs, and styles of writing are commonplace on clothing, and are an influence on many of the corporate logos. Many skateparks and similar youth-oriented venues are decorated with commissioned graffiti-style artwork, and in many others patrons are welcome to leave their own. There is still, however, a fine line between vandalism as an artform, as a political statement, and as a crime. Bristol-born guerrilla artist Banksy's claim is that official vandalism is far worse than that perpetrated by individuals, and that he is decorating buildings of no architectural merit.

=== Graphic design ===
Defacing could also be one of the techniques that many graphic designers use, by applying their own hand writing on a graphic itself. Sometimes the use of this technique might be mistaken as vandalism to the original work, as exemplified by the work of Stefan Sagmeister, including his Lou Reed CD cover. A unique use of the defacement technique is the CD cover for A.P.C. by Jean Touitou, where the designer wrote the title, volume number, and date with her own hand writing on the pre-print blank CD. Creative vandalism of this sort is not limited to writing and sketching. For example, the spraying on the KPIST album Golden coat for MNW Records by Sweden graphic uses gold spray, which may be considered an act of vandalism, but the customer may also appreciate the unicity of each cover that had been sprayed gold in different ways.

== See also ==
- Abuse
- Broken windows theory
- Criminal mischief
- Iconoclasm
- Latrinalia
- Library book vandalism
- Malicious mischief
- Vandalism of art

== Other references ==
- Ballatore, A. (2014), "Defacing the map: Cartographic vandalism in the digital commons", The Cartographic Journal, 51 (3): 214–224, arXiv:1404.3341, Bibcode:2014CartJ..51..214B, doi:10.1179/1743277414y.0000000085, S2CID 1828882
- Cohen, S. (1973), Ward, C. (ed.), Property destruction: Motives and meanings, London: Architectural Press, pp. 23–53
- Goldstein, A. (1996), The Psychology of Vandalism, New York: Plenum Press
- Ley, D. & Cybriwsky, R. (1974), "Urban Graffiti as Territorial Markers", Annals of the Association of American Geographers, 64 (4): 491–505, doi:10.1111/j.1467-8306.1974.tb00998.x
- Merrills, A.; Miles, R. (2010), The Vandals, John Wiley & Sons, ISBN 978-1-4051-6068-1
- Williams, M. (2006), Virtually Criminal: Crime, Deviance, and Regulation Online., Abington, UK: Taylor & Francis

== Bibliography ==
- Hammond, Chris. "BANK". www.motinternational.com. Archived from the original on 24 December 2015.
