= Ken Sanders (book dealer) =

American antiquarian bookseller (born 1951)

- Born: 1951 (age 74–75); Salt Lake City, Utah
- Occupation: Antiquarian bookseller
- Website: www.kensandersbooks.com

Ken Sanders (born 1951) is an American antiquarian bookseller who is also well known for his pursuit of book thieves. He organized a sting operation to capture John Charles Gilkey, and is a major focus of the book The Man Who Loved Books Too Much, about Gilkey's thefts. He has been an appraiser on Antiques Roadshow. He was raised in Salt Lake City, where he "was a serious book collector by age 17."

He founded Ken Sanders Rare Books in 1997 and Dream Garden Press in 1980. In 1982 he was a founding member of the Fund for Wild Nature (then the Earth First! Foundation), which provides grants for the protection of biodiversity and wilderness. He is a member of the Antiquarian Booksellers' Association of America and served on its Board of Governors for six years, during which time he was the Security Chair. He was a friend of Edward Abbey, and is a subject of the documentary WRENCHED!
