= John Charles Gilkey =

American book and document thief

- Born: 1968 (age 57–58); Modesto, California, United States
- Criminal charges: Book and document theft, check fraud

Details
- Span of crimes: 1997–

John Charles Gilkey (born 1968) is a prolific serial book and document thief who has stolen approximately US$200,000 worth of rare books and manuscripts. Gilkey used Modern Library's List of 100 Best Novels as a guide to what items he would steal. Unlike most book thieves who steal for a profit, his motives for the thefts were personal: he saw an expansive library as a sign of being upper-class.

Gilkey used bad checks and stolen credit card numbers gained through his employment at Saks Fifth Avenue in San Francisco. He did not consider that he stole books; instead he would talk about "doing business" with the dealers from whom he stole items. Allison Hoover Bartlett, who wrote The Man Who Loved Books Too Much chronicling Gilkey's thefts and methods, stated that he felt he deserved the books. She also noted that Gilkey would tell her the details of a theft after the statute of limitations on that crime had expired. Since Gilkey kept these books for his personal collection none of these books ever surfaced again on the market.

After a sting operation in 2003 orchestrated by Ken Sanders, a rare book dealer in Salt Lake City, Gilkey served 18 months in San Quentin beginning the following year.

He was arrested again on December 15, 2010, in San Francisco for stealing two antique maps.

Gilkey was the subject of an episode of the podcast Criminal.

== Sources ==
- Bartlett, Allison Hoover (2009), The Man Who Loved Books Too Much: The True Story of a Thief, a Detective, and a World of Literary Obsession, New York: Riverhead, p. 101, ISBN 978-1-59448-891-7
