= Gary Hirshberg =

American businessman (born 1954)

- Born: 1954 (age 71–72); Manchester, New Hampshire, United States
- Education: The Derryfield School
- Alma mater: Hampshire College (BA)
- Occupations: Chairman and former CEO of Stonyfield Farm
- Political party: Democratic
- Spouse: Margaret Hirshberg
- Children: 3

Gary Hirshberg (born 1954) is an American businessman, co-founder and the former CEO of Stonyfield Farm, an organic yogurt company based in Londonderry. He joined the company shortly after its founding in 1983 and stepped down in 2011, remaining as its chairman. Hirshberg is also the founder of the NGOs Organic Voices and the Northeast Organic Farm Partnership.

In 2011, Hirshberg was mentioned as a possible Democratic candidate for the U.S. Senate against New Hampshire's junior U.S. Senator John E. Sununu.

== Early life and education ==
Hirshberg was born in Manchester, New Hampshire, in 1954. He is an alumnus of Hampshire College in Amherst, Massachusetts, graduating in 1976, and of The Derryfield School in Manchester, New Hampshire.

== Career ==
Early in his career, Hirshberg served as executive director of the New Alchemy Institute, a research and education center focused on organic farming, aquaculture, and renewable energy.

In 1983, Hirshberg joined the board of The Rural Education Center (TREC), a small organic farming school with seven cows in Wilton, NH, where Stonyfield was founded. He served as CEO of Stonyfield from its inception until 2011, during which time the company reached $360 million in annual sales.

=== Stonyfield Farm ===
During his tenure as CEO, Stonyfield allowed customers to "adopt" cows and learn about farms. Participants received a photo of their sponsored Stonyfield cow, updates about life on the farm and issues facing small farmers, and information about farming methods. Other Stonyfield programs included "Profits for the Planet", by which Stonyfield donated 10% of profits annually through grants to environmentally focused non-profit organizations, and "Salute Your Commute", a program designed to encourage consumers to use alternative modes of transportation to help reduce carbon emissions.

Under Hirshberg's leadership, Stonyfield's compounded annual growth rate reached over 23%. In 2001, Hirshberg arranged the sale of Stonyfield to Danone and remained CEO for 10 years. In January 2012, he named former Ben & Jerry's CEO Walt Freese as his successor.

After stepping down, Hirshberg became chairman and the managing director of Stonyfield Europe, launching organic brands in France, Ireland, Italy, and Spain.

He resigned from his Danone responsibilities in March 2017 when the US Department of Justice required Danone to divest its Stonyfield holdings. Hirshberg remains Stonyfield's Chair under the new ownership, Lactalis.

== Controversies ==
The Genetic Literacy Project, a non-profit organization promoting awareness and discussion of genetics, biotechnology, evolution and science literacy, has accused Hishberg of promoting an anti-GMO scare campaign in American media. GLP's founder, Jon Entine, called Hishberg a "shill propagandist" in a HuffPost op-ed.

Politico published an article detailing Hirshberg's lobbying activities. The article commented on Hirshberg's attempts to convince Hillary Clinton to "become more involved in the federal effort to establish mandatory labeling, arguing that such a position could help her appeal to Sen. Bernie Sanders’ progressive base and others on the left."

== Activities ==
Hirshberg serves on corporate and non-profit boards including Blue Apron, Inc, Forager Project, Late July Snacks, Orgain, Peak Organic Brewing, Sweetgreen, Sweet Earth Natural Foods, and Unreal, as well as on the Advisory Board of Applegate. He was also the chairman and co-founder of O'Naturals, a chain of fast food restaurants.

Hirshberg is chairman and founding partner of Just Label It, the national campaign to label genetically engineered foods. He is also the chairman of Organic Voices, a consortium that seeks to eliminate consumer confusion about the benefits of organic foods. In March 2011, President Obama appointed Hirshberg to the Advisory Committee for Trade Policy and Negotiations, where he served from 2011 until February 2017.

== Personal life ==
Hirshberg is married to writer Meg Cadoux Hirshberg. They have three children, including Ethan, who is the founder of "Ethan's", a functional drink business. The family currently lives in Concord, New Hampshire.

== Publications ==
Hirshberg is the author of Stirring it Up: How to Make Money and Save the World. (2008).

- Label it Now: What You Need to Know About Genetically Engineered Foods, co-author, eBook, New Word City, Inc. 2012
- Anything But Neutral About Going (Carbon) Neutral, eBook, New Word City, Inc. 2011
- Stirring it Up: How to Make Money and Save the World. Hyperion, 2008
- Gardening for all seasons: The complete guide to producing food at home 12 months a year, co-author, Brick House Pub Co., 1983
- The New Alchemy Water Pumping Windmill Book, Brick House Pub Co., 1982

== Awards and recognition ==
Hirshberg has received twelve honorary doctorates and several corporate and environmental leadership awards, including a 2012 Lifetime Achievement Award by the US EPA. He was named a Yale Gordon Grand Fellow, one of "America's Most Promising Social Entrepreneurs" by Business Week, and one of the top ten "Most Inspiring People in Sustainable Food" by Fast Company. He was featured in the 2008 documentary "Food, Inc."

Awards received by Hirshberg include:

- Mount Sinai Children's Environmental Health Center Champion for Children award, 2015
- Center for Social Innovation and Enterprise, Social Innovator of the Year, 2015
- US Environmental Protection Agency Lifetime Achievement Award, 2012
- Organic Trade Association Organic Leadership Award, 2012
- New Hope Natural Media Hall of Legends Inductee, 2012
- Yale University Gordon Grand Fellow, 2010
- Global Green Foundation Millennial Award for Corporate Environmental Responsibility, 1999
- Business NH Magazine Business Leader of the Year, 1998
- US Small Business Administration Small Business Leader of the Year, 1998
- Ernst and Young New England Socially Responsible Entrepreneur of the Year Award, 1993
