= John D. Robinson (disability advocate) =

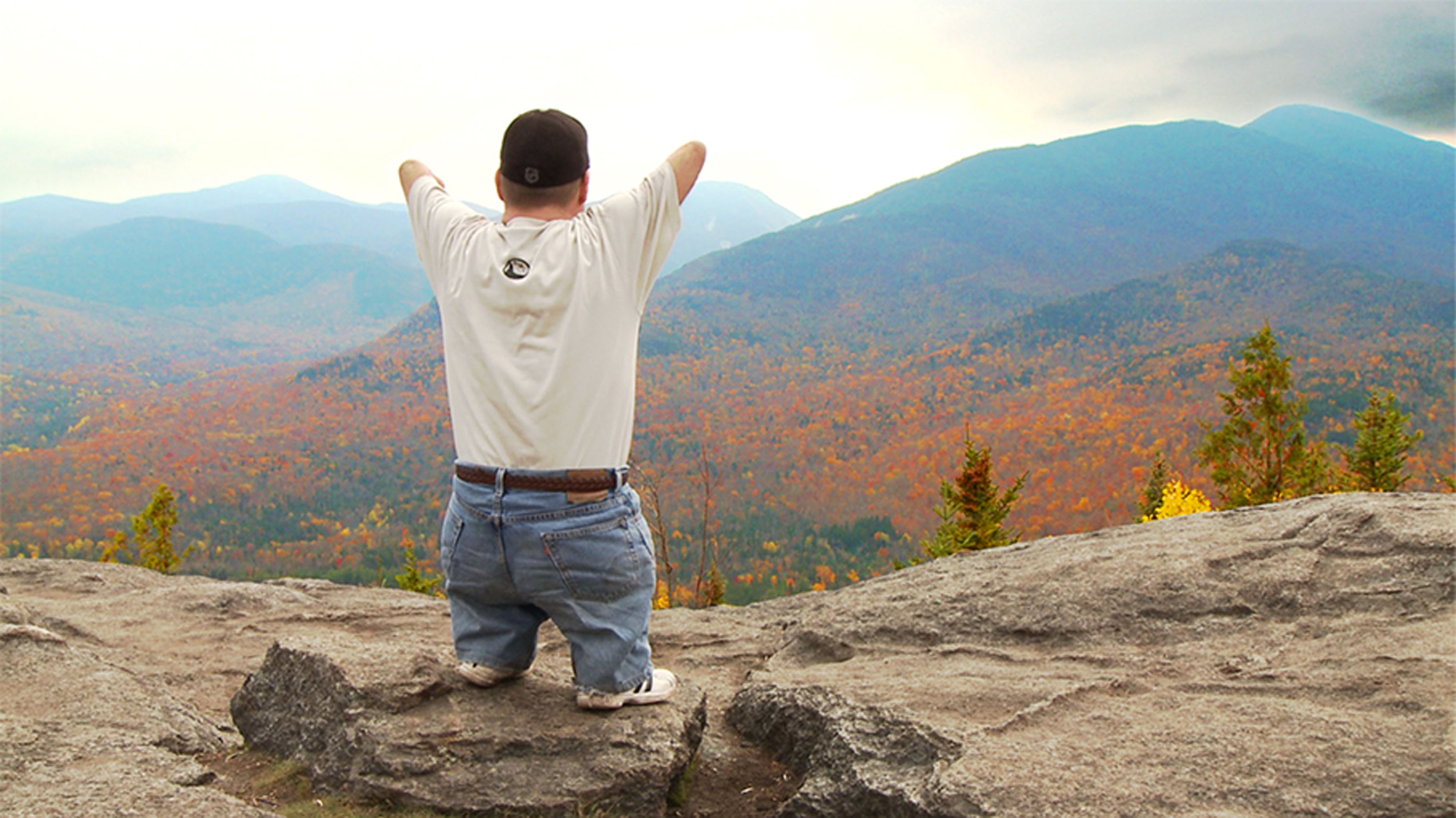
John Robinson on mountain

John D. Robinson is a congenital quadruple amputee, author, entrepreneur and disability advocate from New York. He is the subject of a public television documentary, "Get Off Your Knees: The John Robinson Story", along with a companion autobiography, "Get Off Your Knees: A Story of Faith, Courage, and Determination", published in 2009.

== Biography ==
Born in Binghamton, New York in 1968, Robinson was born without arms and legs for unknown reasons. Since this was after 1961, it was not a birth defect caused by Thalidomide. He graduated from The Derryfield School in Manchester NH in 1986, and received his degree from SI Newhouse School of Public Communications at Syracuse University in 1990.

== Advocacy Work & Media Coverage ==
Since 2011, he's served as managing partner and CEO of Our Ability, founded by him in 2010, which provides inclusive workforce and employment consulting, mentoring, workshops, keynotes and seminars on disability and diversity; and building coalitions among New York State businesses interested in both hiring and building supplier diversity of businesses owned by individuals with disabilities.

He also formed Journey Along the Erie Canal and Journey Along the Scottish Canals Challenges in 2013 and 2018, respectively, as well as the New York Business Leadership Network in 2016.

John Robinson was featured on ABC News in November 2009. Media coverage of Robinson includes WNYT , WRGB, WTEN, and the Times Union, and the Obama White House.

== Honors ==
John Robinson was awarded the Capital Region Chamber Champion Award in 2018, the New York State Assembly Disability Champion Award in 2018, and is a 2014 White House Champion of Change
