= The Man Who Loved Books Too Much =

2009 non-fiction book by Allison Hoover Bartlett

The Man Who Loved Books Too Much: The True Story of a Thief, a Detective, and a World of Literary Obsession
- Front cover
- Author: Allison Hoover Bartlett
- Language: English
- Genre: Non-fiction
- Publisher: Riverhead Books
- Publication date: 2009
- Publication place: United States
- Media type: Print, e-book
- Pages: 274 pages
- ISBN: 1594488916

The Man Who Loved Books Too Much: The True Story of a Thief, a Detective, and a World of Literary Obsession is a 2009 non-fiction book by American journalist and author Allison Hoover Bartlett. The book chronicles the crimes of John Charles Gilkey, a book collector who utilized check and credit card fraud to steal a number of rare manuscripts and first editions from dealers. Bartlett also covers the efforts of Ken Sanders, a bookseller and part-time investigator of book theft, as he attempted to track down Gilkey and bring him to justice. The book received mixed reviews, with reviewers praising Bartlett's research and inclusion of smaller vignettes about other people notably obsessed with books, but criticizing her attempts to draw conclusions that aren't supported by the narrative as well as her over-frequent injection of her own self into the story.

== Background ==
Bartlett, a journalist, was first introduced to the world of rare book collecting when a friend showed her a recently acquired, pigskin-bound German manuscript from the 1600s. She began doing research on the subject, including interviewing industry professionals and attending book fairs, as well as doing a small amount of collecting herself. In the course of this research, Bartlett discovered a considerable amount of information on the internet regarding the theft of rare books and manuscripts. Intrigued, Bartlett investigated further, which led her to the story of John Charles Gilkey. She eventually wrote an article on the subject for San Francisco Magazine, and later decided to expand that story into a book-length narrative, which became The Man Who Loved Books Too Much.

== Synopsis ==
The book's primary focus is on the criminal career of Gilkey, a man who used his position as an employee of the Saks Fifth Avenue department store in San Francisco, California to steal customers' credit card numbers, which he then used to purchase rare books and manuscripts over the telephone. Gilkey, who had been to jail previously for credit card fraud used to settle gambling losses, began using the fraud to purchase rare books in 1997, at the age of 29.

Bartlett describes Gilkey as someone who, having little class or refinement of his own, sought to gain those qualities through the acquisition of objects. The disconnect between this fantasy and the reality of Gilkey's actual character, Bartlett argues, shows in the fact that he only ever read one of his acquisitions (Nabokov's Lolita, which he declared "disgusting"). Bartlett describes a pathological nature to Gilkey's behavior, pointing to his assertions that he's "getting things for free" rather than stealing them as evidence that he lies to himself as much as to those he victimizes.

Alongside her narrative of Gilkey's criminal deeds, Bartlett also tells the story of Ken Sanders, a dealer of rare books and one-time head of security for the Antiquarian Booksellers' Association of America. Sanders is described as being just as passionate about tracking down book thieves as Gilkey is about theft, and Bartlett recounts Sanders learning of Gilkey's existence and his subsequent efforts at catching him. Sanders's job was made more difficult by the fact that Gilkey's acquisitions rarely resurfaced; as opposed to most book thieves, Gilkey did not steal in order to then sell for profit.

Over the course of the book, Bartlett compares and contrasts the two men and their respective obsessions. She describes Gilkey's sense of entitlement to the books as well as Sanders's frustration at Gilkey's belief that he has the right to steal since book dealers won't sell at a price he can afford. Eventually, due in part to Sanders's determination and in part to the efforts of a California police officer, Gilkey was successfully apprehended as he attempted to illegally purchase a copy of Steinbeck's The Grapes of Wrath. A search of his house turned up 26 more stolen books, all together worth at least $100,000, and Gilkey ended up serving an 18-month prison sentence following a guilty plea.

Interspersed in the narrative are multiple shorter accounts of other noted bibliophiles along with some of the consequences of their respective obsessions. Bartlett includes the stories of a botany professor who died sleeping on a bed in his kitchen while the rest of his house was filled with 90 short tons (82 t) of books, a monk who murdered numerous colleagues in order to steal from their libraries, and even Thomas Jefferson, who donated his own collection to help build the Library of Congress.

== Reception ==
The Man Who Loved Books Too Much released on September 17, 2009, to mixed reviews. Christopher Beha wrote for The New York Times Book Review that the book, though entertaining and well written, is inherently flawed in that it is based on the faulty premise of Gilkey being a complex character. Bartlett spends considerable time wondering why Gilkey would risk his freedom over books even as she recounts the fact that as a child he stole from a store indiscriminately.

Carmela Ciuraru of the Los Angeles Times praised Bennett's research and called the book "tautly written, wry and thoroughly compelling". M.M. Wolfe of PopMatters and Vadim Rizov of The A.V. Club each objected to the degree to which Bartlett included herself in the narrative, with Rizov commenting that she "keeps getting in her own way, imposing herself where she isn't needed". Kirkus Reviews, similarly, found Bartlett amply capable of detailing the psychological workings of Gilkey and his ilk but failing to uphold journalistic standards of objectivity.
