= Forbes Smiley =

American convicted thief (born 1956)

- Born: Edward Forbes Smiley III; April 13, 1956 (age 70); Bedford, New Hampshire, U.S.
- Education: The Derryfield School
- Alma mater: Hampshire College
- Occupations: Former rare map dealer, art thief

Edward Forbes Smiley III (born April 13, 1956) is an American former rare map dealer and convicted art thief. He was found guilty in 2006 of stealing 97 rare maps originally valued at more than US$3 million, and sentenced to 42 months in prison.

== Early life and career ==
Smiley grew up in Bedford, New Hampshire, and graduated from The Derryfield School in Manchester, New Hampshire. After graduating from Hampshire College, he became a dealer in rare maps. Working in early and rare maps of the world and North America, he was instrumental in helping others to build up two major collections that were subsequently donated to research libraries: the Lawrence H. Slaughter collection now in the New York Public Library and the Norman B. Leventhal Collection at the Boston Public Library. Although Smiley appeared to have a successful career, he was actually mired in debt. He turned to stealing maps from libraries and rare book collections and then reselling them to unsuspecting buyers to make ends meet.

== Thefts and arrest ==
On June 8, 2005, the discovery of an X-Acto blade on the floor of the reading room in the Beinecke Rare Book and Manuscript Library at Yale University led to Smiley's arrest. The blade was found by Ellen Cordes, the head of public services for the library. She looked through the sign-in register and did a search of his name on the internet, found he was a rare maps dealer, and called security. Although three maps on his person matched those missing from books he had just examined in the Beinecke, he protested his innocence. It was not until his court appearance a year later (June 22, 2006) that he confessed to having stolen a total of 97 maps from six institutions — Boston Public Library, Harvard University (Houghton Library), Newberry Library (in Chicago), New York Public Library (the Rare Book and Map Divisions), and Yale University (Beinecke Library and the Sterling Memorial Library) in the United States, as well as the British Library in London.

In August 2015, Ronald Grim, a curator of the Boston Public Library, traveled to an antiquities dealer in New York to confirm what he recognized to be a map stolen from the library years prior. It was a rare map advertised in that New York antiques dealer's summer catalog, and had been created by explorer Samuel de Champlain in 1612. It provided a description of the New England coast and what would later become Canada. According to library records, the map was last seen by Forbes Smiley inside the library on January 2, 2003. A photograph of the map taken by the library in 1992 was key in proving the map was owned by the Boston Public Library, and after months of legal wrangling it was finally returned.

The recovery of the Champlain map led to discussions on whether Smiley (still living on Martha's Vineyard) stole more maps than recorded, and what more can be done to recover them.

== Sentencing ==
At his federal sentencing on September 27, 2006, Judge Janet Bond Arterton took note of his cooperation with the Federal Bureau of Investigation: "If you steal human treasures, then you will go to prison, but if you help recover them, this will be taken into account and weighed in the balance". Since all but six of the 97 maps Smiley admitted stealing had been recovered, he was sentenced to three and a half years imprisonment. Later, in May 2007, he was ordered to pay US$2.3 million in restitution. (The original valuation on the stolen maps had been over US$3 million.) Reported losses by a handful of leading dealers who had unwittingly sold stolen maps acquired from Smiley ran to more than US$400,000 each in three cases; no details have been given about any reimbursement. A second sentencing before a state judge, Richard Damiani, on 13 October 2006, confirmed the earlier sentence, though the judge was critical of the trust placed in Smiley's statements by his federal counterpart.

== Coverage ==
The case was widely covered across the United States and elsewhere. Smiley pleaded guilty and he was never cross-examined. Apart from the details he supplied himself, much of the available information came from journalists. Some suspected that Smiley had taken more maps than he admitted. Each of the affected libraries issued lists of missing maps. Several of the entries matched copies of books, now missing their maps, which Smiley had examined. For example, Smiley had admitted stealing from Harvard University an example of the map of the Aztec capital Tenochtitlan, illustrating a letter from Hernán Cortés (1524), but a prior photograph of the example missing from Yale's Beinecke Library proved instead that it was theirs.

Several questions remain unanswered, in particular about the origin and purpose of high quality facsimiles of early maps, some found on Smiley's person when he was arrested, and others in books he examined. One hypothesis regarding the high quality facsimiles, including use of period-appropriate laid paper, is that a thief might insert a facsimile to replace a stolen original, in hopes of decreasing the risk of the theft being discovered. There is no confirmation that Smiley substituted facsimiles for stolen originals. However, Smiley is known to have sold an original 1666 Horne map of Carolina to one dealer, and a high-quality facsimile of that very same copy to another dealer. Each of these maps ended up in private collections and the forgery was only discovered when it was sent to auction in 2023.

Smiley is the subject of a non-fiction book, The Map Thief: The Gripping Story of an Esteemed Rare-Map Dealer Who Made Millions Stealing Priceless Maps, written by Michael Blanding and published by Gotham Books on May 29, 2014.

== Legacy ==
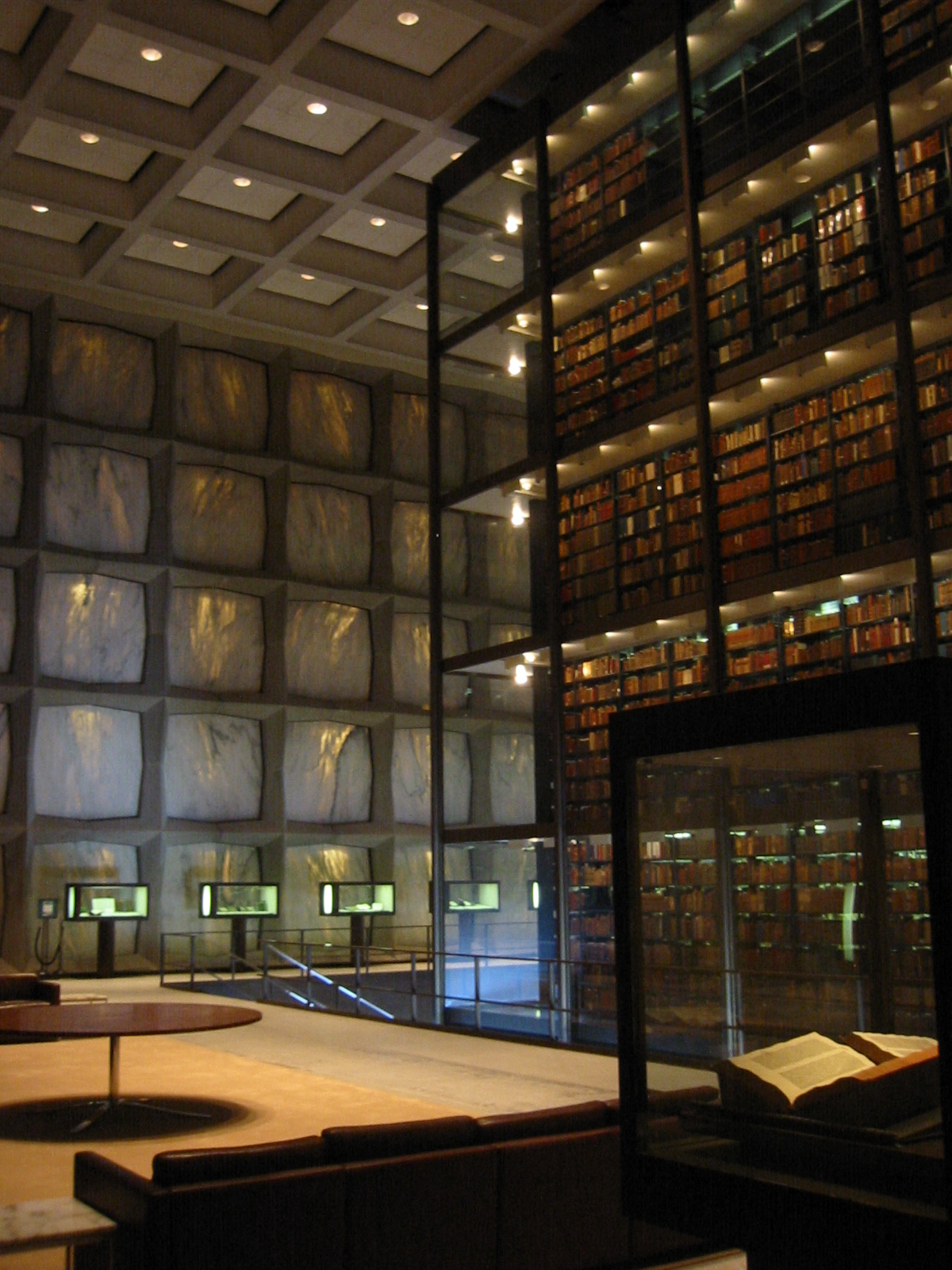
Secure stacks at the Beinecke Library

As a result of Smiley's thefts, research libraries are now more aware of the vulnerability of maps illustrating volumes in their rare book collections, and are improving their documentation and security procedures. At the same time they appreciate the importance to scholars of continued access to such works. The changes are noticeable at Yale's Sterling Memorial Library, where a comprehensive program of cataloging and digitizing the early map collection is under way, funded largely by a donation of US$100,000 from William Reese, who had acted as Yale's advisor throughout the Smiley affair. Some libraries now monitor their reading rooms with continuous video surveillance.

Smiley was not the first major map thief. Miles Harvey's book The Island of Lost Maps — about the convicted map thief Gilbert Bland — describes a number of earlier thieves including two Europeans active in or before 2001. However, Smiley may be responsible for more financial and cultural loss than any of his predecessors.

Smiley was released from prison on January 15, 2010.
