= Fund for Wild Nature =

- Formation: 1982; 44 years ago
- Type: Non-governmental organization
- Purpose: Nature conservation
- Headquarters: Portland, Oregon
- Location: United States
- Region served: North America
- Website: https://fundwildnature.org/

The Fund For Wild Nature is an environmental organization that gives financial support to grassroot projects and organizations that work for the protection of biodiversity and wilderness. The Fund works exclusively for projects in countries of North America. It has no endowment and is supported entirely by donations from individuals. Their support has helped foster the beginning of such groups as the Rainforest Action Network, Center for Biological Diversity and Ruckus Society. They were founded in 1982 by members of the Earth First! organization, and their headquarters is in Portland, Oregon.

== History ==
The Fund For Wild Nature was founded as the Earth First! Foundation in 1982 by Lance Christie, LaRue Christie, Abe Blank, Bill Bishop, Ken Sanders (Edward Abbey's friend), and Bruce Hayse. The current name was adopted in 1991. Among the groups that were initiated with the help of their support, we can find the Rainforest Action Network, the Center for Biological Diversity, Sinapu, Community Environmental Legal Defense Fund, Los Padres Forest Watch, Prairie Dog Coalition, and Firefighters United for Safety, Ethics and Ecology.

== Structure and aims ==
The Fund provides modest grants to grassroots organizations (i.e., those with annual budgets of less than $250,000). It funds project expenses, not general overhead. The Fund provides money for campaigns within the United States, Canada, and Mexico to conserve and restore native species and wild ecosystems, including actions to defend wilderness and biological diversity. The Funds supports grassroot projects for issues that are not given enough national attention, and would otherwise not be funded through mainstream sources. They believe in seeking alliances with related groups within the field to achieve systemic change. Historically, the Fund has supported actions for wildlife, wilderness, rivers and marine life, as well as actions against development, logging, grazing, mining, and other activities the Fund considers harmful.

The Fund bases their principles on the philosophy of biocentrism. They believe that human beings have become displaced from their natural environment, and see the importance of protecting wildlife as part of a fundamental struggle to reconnect to our origins and protect a healthy state of existence.

== See also ==
- Biodiversity
- Earth First!
- Wilderness
