= Library theft =

Illegal removal of materials from a library

Theft from libraries of books, historical documents, maps and other materials from libraries is considered a significant problem. One study commissioned in the UK estimated the average loss rate of libraries to theft at 5.3% per year.

In the U.S. state of Pennsylvania, the third conviction for library theft is a felony, regardless of the value of the material.

Library thieves, who may be staff or regular visitors of the library, risk being discovered if a book is found in the library catalog, but is missing from the shelves. To avoid this, some thieves also steal the corresponding catalog card.

== History ==
Public libraries' main concerns are not security issues. Instead, the goal of the public library is to freely grant access to resources and information. However, granting this access, especially to a wide variety of library patrons, creates security issues that are a secondary concern of the public library. The secondary concern of library security deals with the increasingly difficult task of enabling free access to resources while also maintaining control of those resources. Enabling free and equal access to all people also includes people who are thieves.

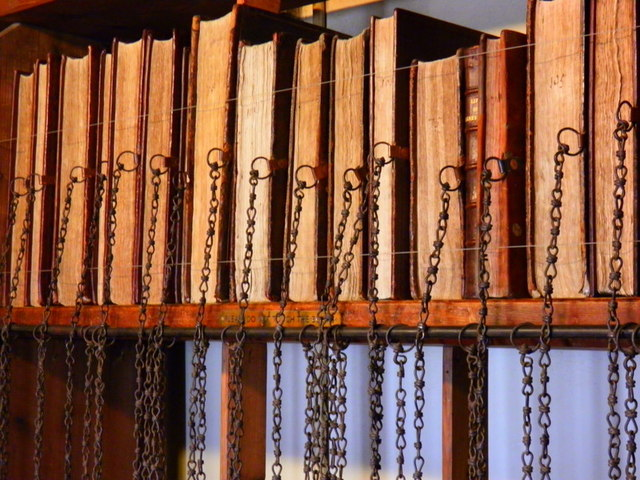
Books in the chained library of Wimborne Minster, United Kingdom.

The library has been subjected to theft for centuries. One of the earliest deterrents of library theft was the invention of chained libraries, where the books are attached to their bookcase by a chain, which is sufficiently long to allow the books to be taken from their shelves and read, but not removed from the library itself. As libraries began to accumulate more resources and more patrons, chained libraries became inefficient, and new methods were created for deterring library theft.

As of early 1960s, libraries used a combination of methods for deterring theft. Some methods included manual checkpoints, turnstiles, or electronic theft detectors like Checkpoint, Sentronic, and Tattle-Tape. However, those methods were not always successful, and some libraries still reported losses of $5,000 to $6,000 annually.

Currently, there are many new initiatives to prevent library theft. The Association of College and Research Libraries has published a guideline regarding security and theft in special collections. The guideline includes many topics which are also adopted by general collections of the public library.

== Prevention ==
Theft from libraries is typically prevented by installing electronic article surveillance alarms at the doors. Library materials are tagged and if the tag is not deactivated it sounds an alarm. In some libraries with older or rare materials, readers are not allowed to take coats or bags into the reading area except for a few items in a clear plastic bag. Security cameras are used in some libraries.

In 2009, due to an increase in theft and vandalism of library materials in the United States, the American Library Association published the Guidelines Regarding Security and Theft in Special Collections. The document addresses important issues and gives strategies for libraries developing adequate security measures for special collections. The organization suggests appointing a security officer, developing a written security policy, ongoing personnel management and training, and conducting regular inventory checks. There are also guidelines given for creating an action plan on what to do if the library has discovered a theft or any staff members witness a theft occurring.

== Trends ==
In public libraries, librarians have noticed common themes in what subjects are most frequently stolen. Books on topics such as sex and witchcraft are popular with thieves, as are guides for General Educational Development testing. In a poll taken in 1996, the top three books that went missing were: The Joy of Sex, GED Examination Books, and the Prophecies of Nostradamus. The Guinness Book of Records records its own issues as the most stolen book from public libraries in the United States. It is followed in the ranking by the Christian Bible in its different languages and editions.

== Incidents and perpetrators ==
Rare books departments of libraries especially fall target to professional thieves. In 1996, two rare early Mormon manuscripts were stolen from the Public Library of Cincinnati and Hamilton County, when the thief requested the manuscript and replaced it with a facsimile.

In many cases, document thieves occupy positions of trust, or have established records of legitimate accomplishment, prior to their crimes. Examples of notable convicted document thieves include:

- Marino Massimo De Caro, director of the Biblioteca Girolamini in Naples, Italy
- John Charles Gilkey
- Barry Landau (born c. 1948) and his accomplice Jason Savedoff, who stole over 10,000 documents from museums and libraries along the East Coast of the United States
- former New York State archivist Daniel D. Lorello
- Frede Møller-Kristensen (1933 – 2003), who between 1968 and 1978 stole some 1,600 historical books worth more than $50 million from the Danish National Library
- antiquities dealer Forbes Smiley, who stole nearly 100 maps from libraries in the United States and Great Britain over the course of eight years
- Greg Priore, manager of the Oliver Room at the Carnegie Library of Pittsburgh, who stole $8 million worth of rare materials between 1992 and 2018.

== See also ==
- Bibliomania
- Bookselling
- Book store shoplifting
- Convicted book-thieves
- Library book vandalism
- List of destroyed libraries
- Zaydani Library, a whole collection of Arabic manuscripts taken away by a French merchant ship after Sultan Zidan Abu Maali of Marrakesh did not pay for transportation and then seized by Spanish privateers.
