= Naval Station Rota =

Spanish-American naval base in Rota, Spain

Naval Station Rota
- Base Naval de Rota
- Rota, Province of Cádiz in Spain
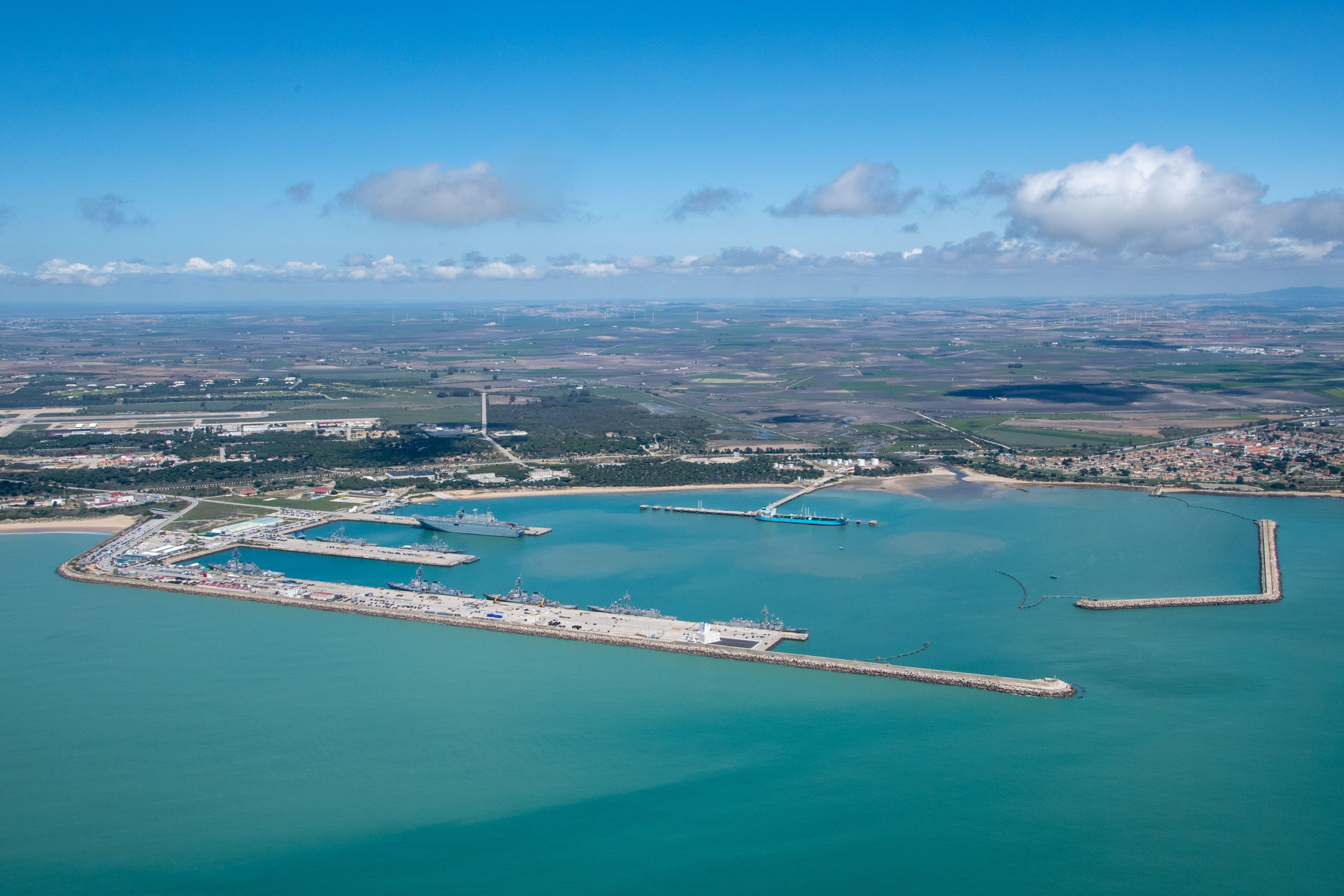
- Aerial view

Site information
- Type: port and airbase
- Owner: Spanish Ministry of Defence
- Operator: Spanish Navy; US Navy
- Controlled by: Naval Action Force (Spain); Navy Region Europe, Africa, Central (USN)
- Condition: Operational

Location
- Coordinates: 36°37′15″N 6°19′54″W

Site history
- Built: 19th century
- In use: 19th century – present

Garrison information
- Current commander: Vice Admiral Juan María Ibáñez Martín (Spain); Captain Charles A. Chmielak (USN)

Airfield information
- Identifiers: IATA: ROZ, ICAO: LERT, WMO: 084490
- Elevation: 26 metres (85 ft) AMSL
Runways
Direction	Length and surface
10/28	3,690 metres (12,106 ft) Concrete/Asphalt
- Source: Aeronautical Information Service Spain

Naval Station Rota, also known as NAVSTA Rota (IATA: ROZ, ICAO: LERT) (Spanish: Base Naval de Rota), is a Spanish naval base, that is jointly used by the Spanish Navy and the United States Navy. Located in Rota in the Province of Cádiz, NAVSTA Rota is the largest American military community in Spain, housing U.S. Navy and U.S. Marine Corps personnel. There are also small U.S. Army and U.S. Air Force contingents on the base.

== History ==
The construction of the Rota Naval Base was carried out in the 19th century, being the base of the Headquarters of the Spanish Fleet.

=== U.S. agreement with Francoist dictatorship ===
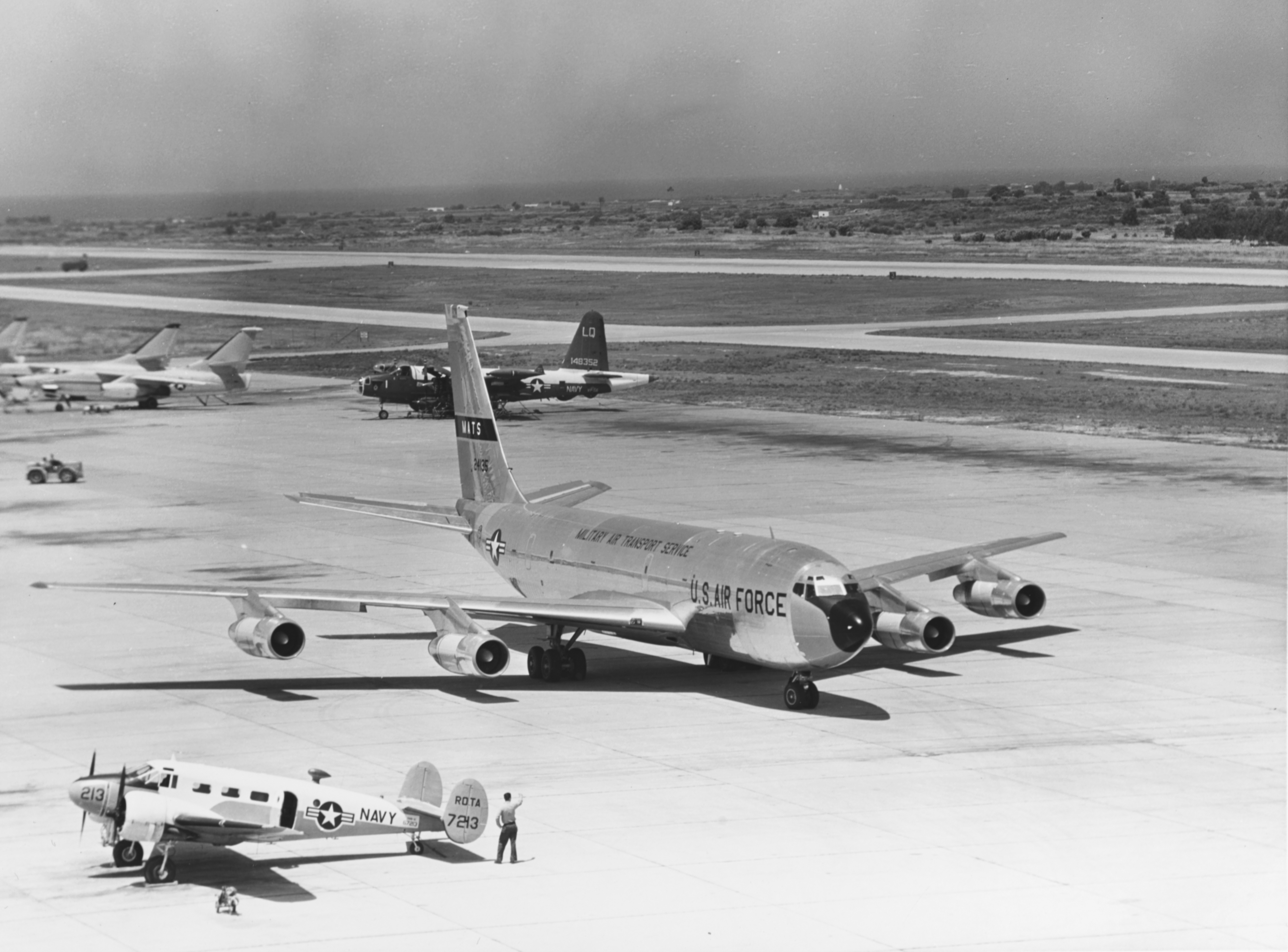
U.S. Air Force Boeing C-135B-BN Stratolifter on the Rota's Airfield circa mid-1960s

NAVSTA Rota has been in use by the U.S. since 1953, when Spanish general Francisco Franco strengthened relations with the United States as a move to relax international sanctions imposed by the United Nations since 1945. The installation now covers more than 6,000 acres (24 km^{2}) on the northern shore of Cadiz, an area recognized for its strategic, maritime importance over the centuries.

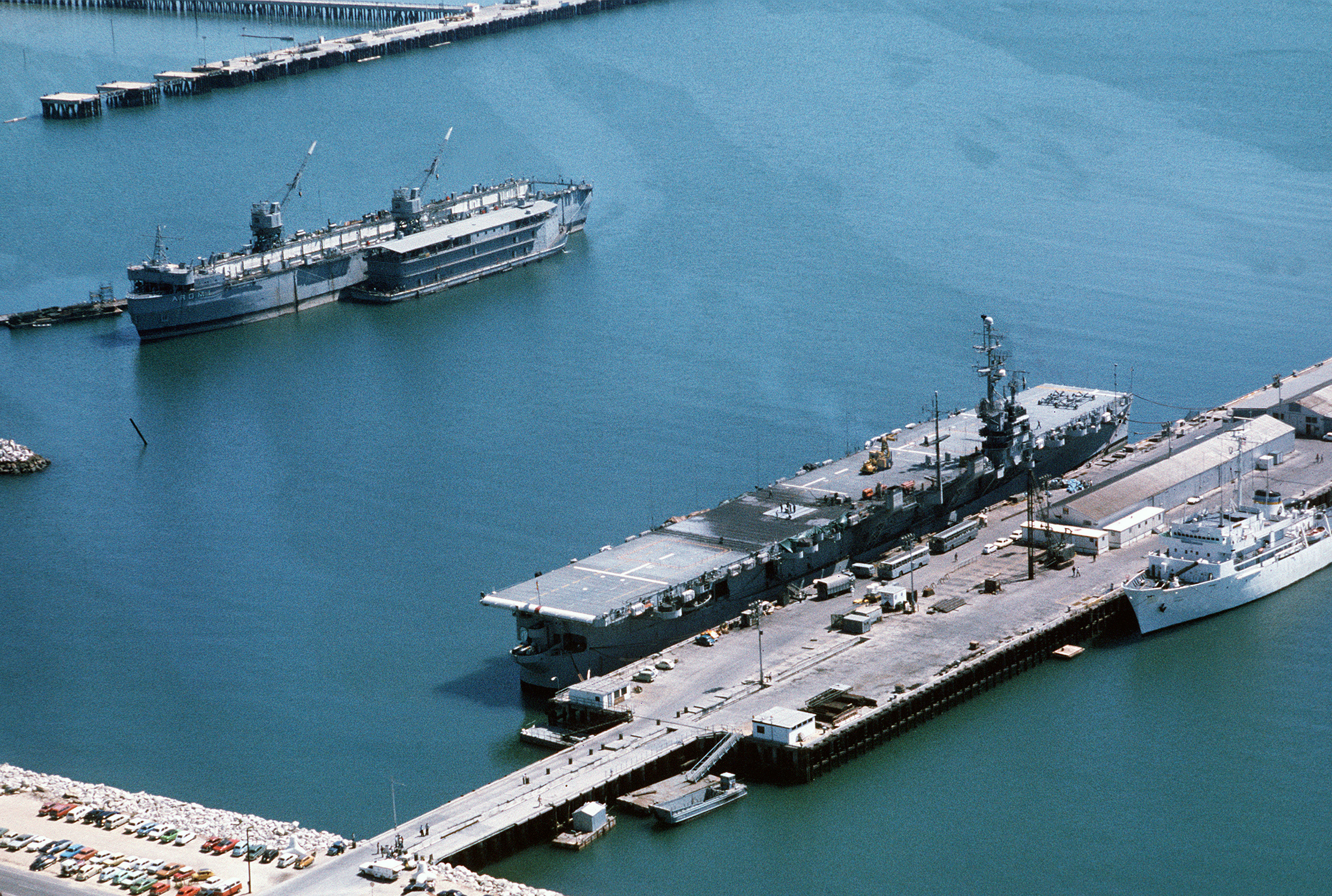
The Spanish Navy aircraft carrier Dédalo (ex USS Cabot) tied up at a pier at Naval Station Rota in 1976

=== Polaris submarines ===
During the Cold War, Rota became an advanced base for SSBN submarines of the U.S. Navy, which was very important as the Soviet Union was in range of Polaris missiles launched from Rota. The Chief of Naval Operations deployed Submarine Squadron 16 (SUBRON 16) to Rota on 28 January 1964 and embarked upon USS Proteus. USS Lafayette completed its first Fleet Ballistic Missile (FBM) deterrent patrol with the Polaris missile and commenced the first refit and replenishment at Rota. During the early 1970s, the submarines assigned to SUBRON 16 were completing conversion to the Poseidon missile. That transition was completed when USS Francis Scott Key returned to Rota on 14 January 1974. Treaty negotiations between Spain and the United States in 1975 resulted in a planned withdrawal of SUBRON 16 from Spain, and the Chief of Naval Operations ordered studies to select a new refit site on the East Coast of the United States. The U.S. Senate ratified the treaty in June 1976; it called for the squadron's withdrawal from Spain by July 1979. In November 1976 the Secretary of the Navy announced Naval Submarine Base Kings Bay, Georgia as that new refit site.

=== Sea control ===
At its peak size in the early 1980s, NAVSTA Rota was home to 16,000 sailors and their families, to include two permanently forward deployed aviation squadrons, Fleet Air Reconnaissance Squadron Two (VQ-2) and Fleet Logistics Support Squadron Twenty Two (VR-22). VQ-2 was based at Rota from 1959 until 2005, when it relocated to NAS Whidbey Island, Washington. VR-22 flew the C-130F and was based at Rota from 1962 until its inactivation in 1993. Through the early 1990s, a patrol squadron of P-3B and later P-3C aircraft from U.S. Navy patrol squadrons based in the United States would also be forward deployed, split-based between NAVSTA Rota and Naval Air Facility Lajes at Lajes Air Base in the Azores to track Soviet naval vessels and submarines in the Atlantic Ocean and in the Mediterranean Sea.

When Soviet surface and submarine naval deployments to the Mediterranean increased throughout the 1970s and early 1980s, NAVSTA Rota enabled maritime patrol aircraft to conduct continuous surveillance and tracking of Soviet ships before, during, and after their transit through the Strait of Gibraltar. Data was then forwarded to United States Sixth Fleet Headquarters, providing also critical intelligence regarding Soviet ships' acoustic signatures, operating characteristics, and warfighting capabilities. NAVSTA Rota staff's role as guardians of Sixth Fleet's front door earned them the moniker Gatekeepers of the Med. With the collapse of the Soviet Union, focus shifted to adapt to the new missions of Sixth Fleet.

During the Cold War the patrol squadrons would rotate deployment assignment to Rota and Lajes every six months and were augmented by Naval Air Reserve patrol squadrons for shorter durations on a periodic basis.

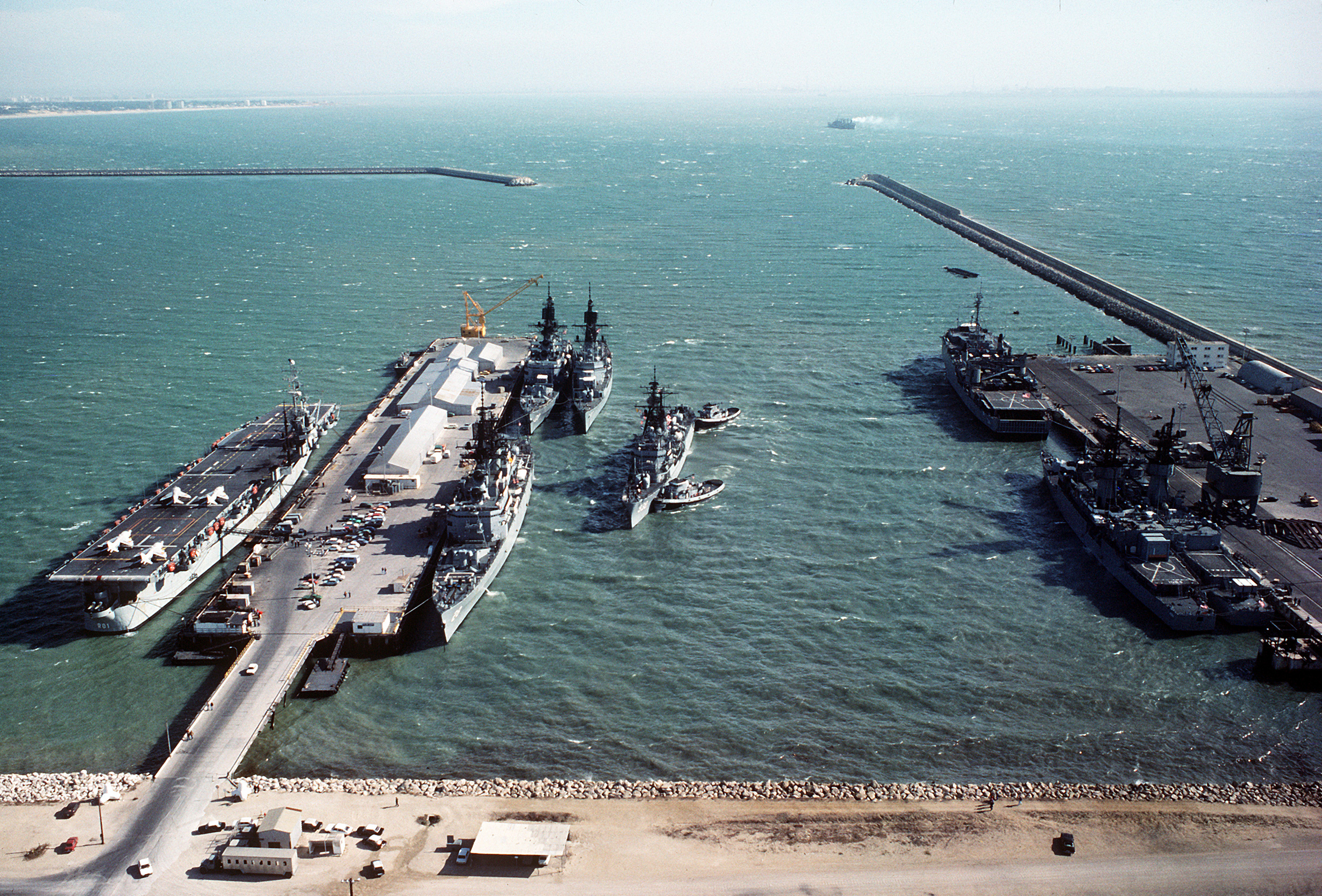
Spanish and American ships moored at the docks of the Rota base in 1981

=== End of Cold War ===
With the downsizing of the U.S. Navy during the late 1980s and early 1990s, especially after the end of the Cold War, the base's population dramatically declined. The U.S. Navy maintains approximately 5,200 acres (21 km^{2}) of the 6,000-acre (24 km^{2}) complex. There are about 4,000 Americans in Rota, including military, civilians, and their families.

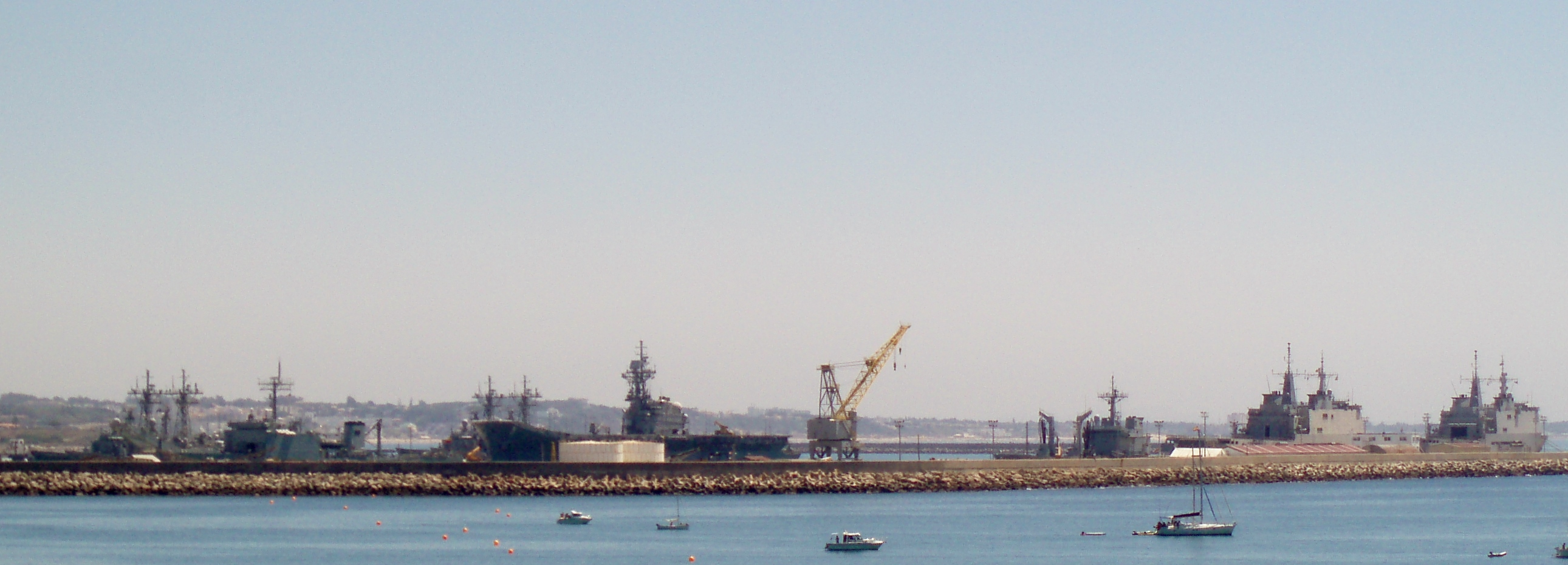
Ships of the Spanish Navy in their usual mooring at the Naval base in Rota in 2008

=== United States Air Force interest ===
As the U.S. Navy started to reduce its presence, the USAF realized the potential of the airfield as a refueling stop in Middle East deployments. Rota was used by C-5 Galaxy and C-141 Starlifter transport aircraft in the Gulf War in 1991. During that war B-52 Stratofortress bombers were stationed at nearby Morón Air Base, where detachments of USAF KC-135 Stratotanker aerial refueling aircraft had rotated during years. Later, the U.S. agreed with Spain to improve air base installations so it could handle more cargo plane operations.

In April 2011, the commander of the U.S. Navy garrison at the base, Captain William F. Mosk, was relieved of command and reassigned during an investigation into illegal drug use by U.S. servicemen at the installation. Rear Admiral Tony Gaiani relieved Mosk for "lost confidence in his ability to command", specifically, to handle issues related to the investigation.

=== Antimissile Shield ===
On October 5, 2011, U.S. Secretary of Defense Leon Panetta announced that the U.S. Navy will station four Aegis warships at Rota to strengthen its presence in the Mediterranean Sea and bolster the missile defense of NATO as part of the European Phased Adaptive Approach (EPAA). As of 2015, four U.S. destroyers, including USS Arleigh Burke, USS Ross, USS Porter, and USS Roosevelt are permanently forward-deployed to Naval Station Rota as part of the Missile Defense System.

In 2021 the base temporarily hosted thousands of Afghan refugees transported by the 2021 Kabul airlift. One of the agreements that emerged from the 2022 NATO Madrid summit was to expand the U.S. destroyers stationed at the base from 4 to 6 and 600 more troops. The extension agreement was signed in May 2023.

== Overview ==
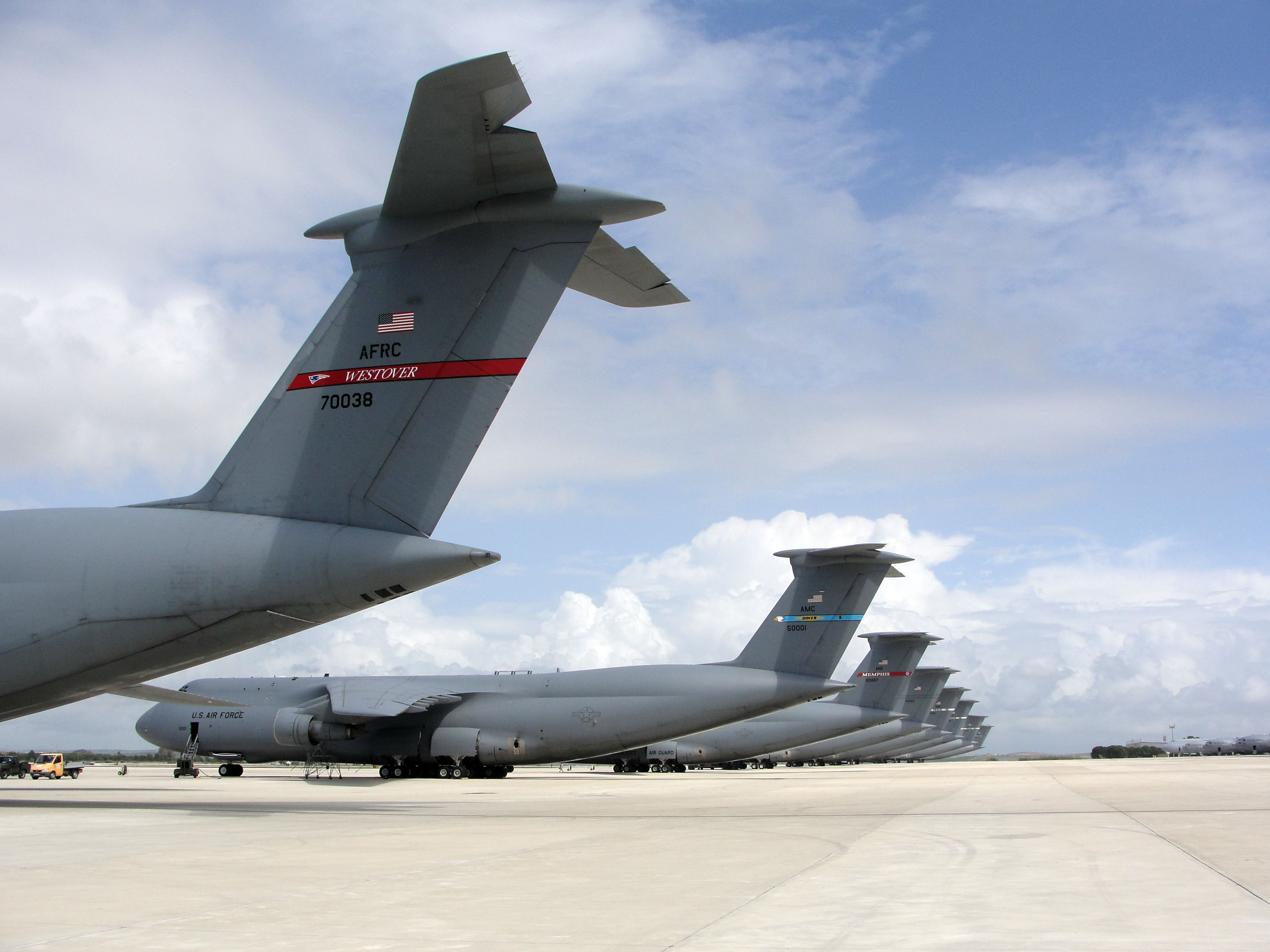
Eight C-5 Galaxy aircraft at Rota

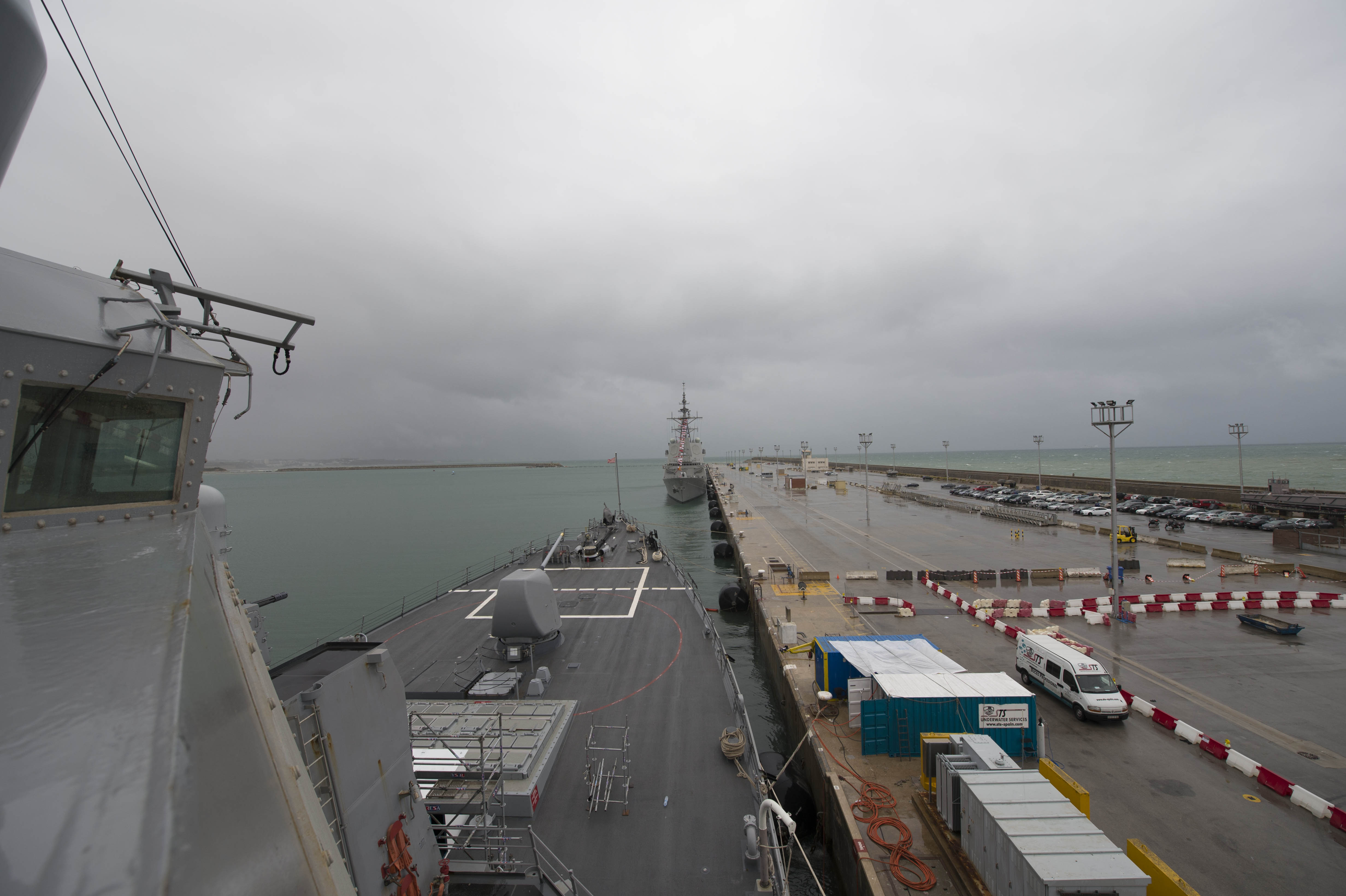
USS Carney at Rota

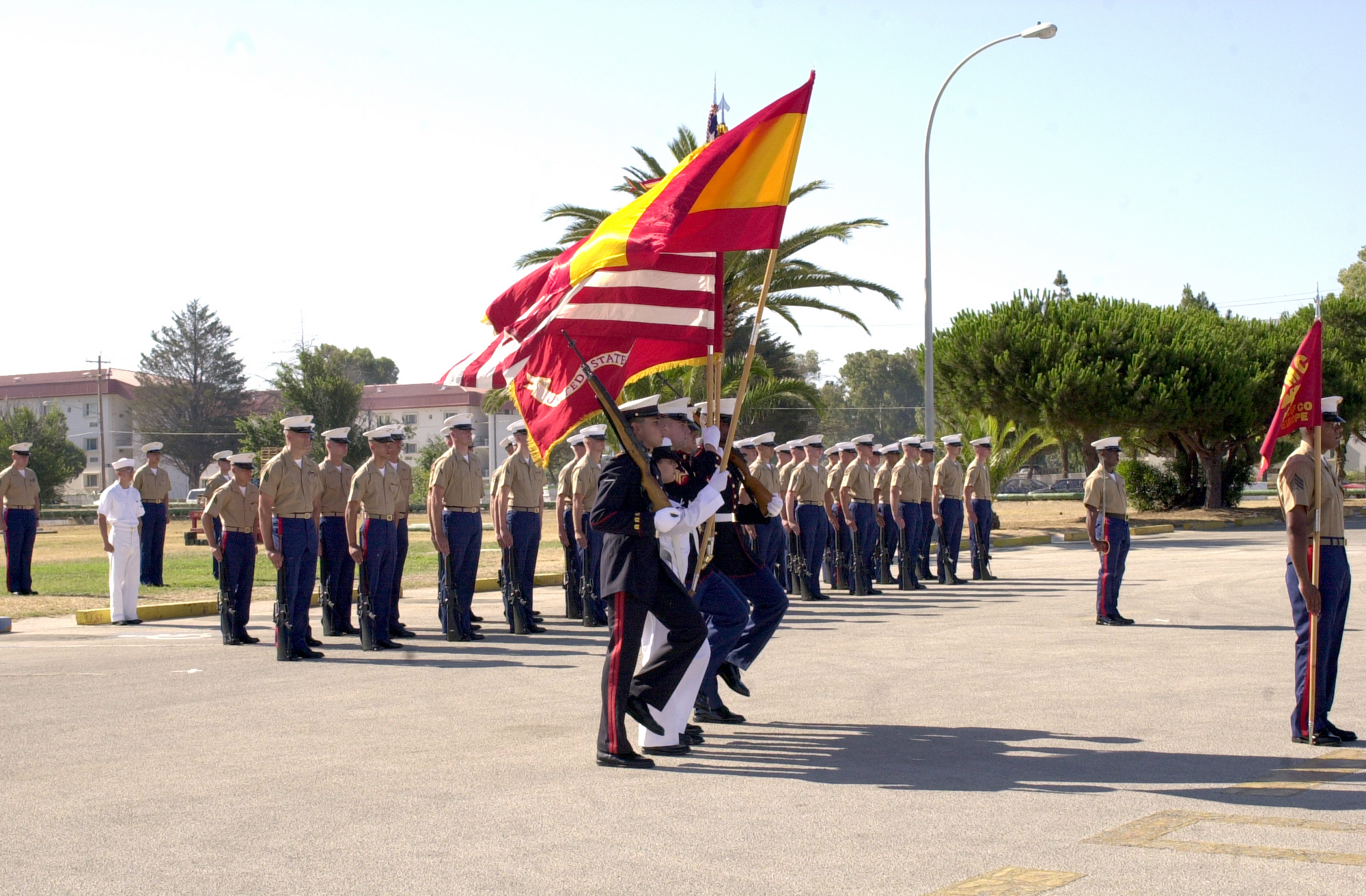
The joint US-Spanish Color Guard aboard Naval Station, Rota, parades the colors during the Change of Command and Marine Corps Security Force Europe.

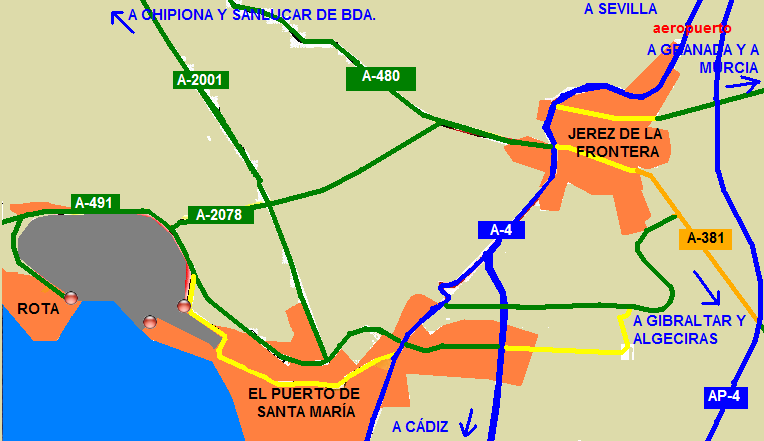
The Naval Base is depicted in grey

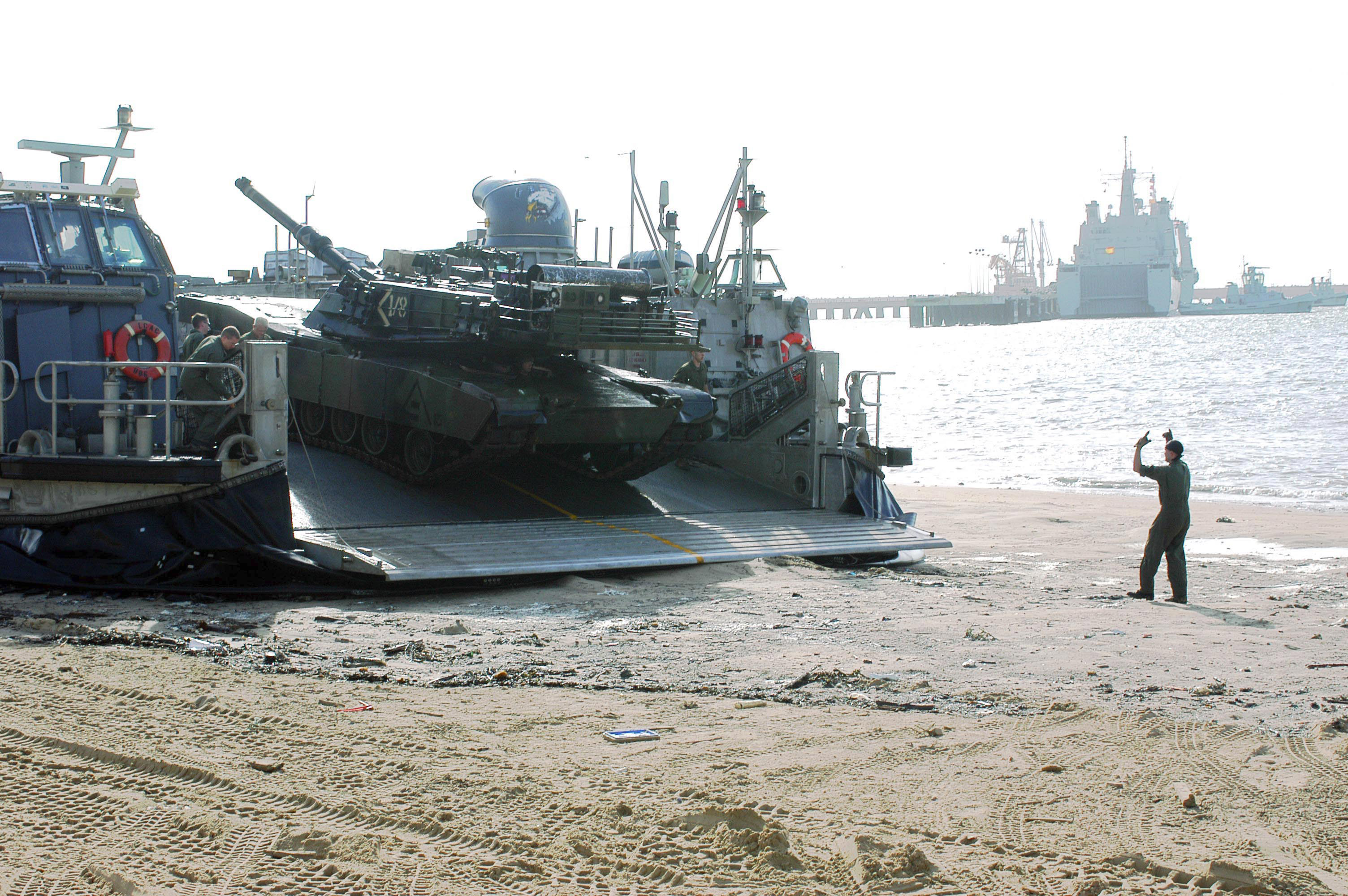
A US Marine from USS Nashville unloads a M1A1 Abrams main battle tank from a Landing Craft Air Cushion at Naval Station Rota

Naval Station Rota is home to an airfield and a seaport; the airfield has often caused the base to be misidentified as "Naval Air Station Rota". The base is the headquarters for Commander, U.S. Naval Activities Spain (COMNAVACTSPAIN), as well as a primary gateway for Air Mobility Command flights into Europe.

Naval Station Rota is strategically located near the Strait of Gibraltar and at the halfway point between the United States and Southwest Asia. Because of this ideal location, the base is able to provide invaluable support to both US Sixth Fleet units in the Mediterranean and to USAF Air Mobility Command units transiting to Germany and Southwest Asia. The Base and its tenant commands are located within the boundaries of the 6,100-acre (25 km^{2}) Spanish "Base Naval de Rota". Under the guidance of the Agreement for Defense Cooperation, the US and Spanish navies work together and share many facilities. The US Navy has the responsibility for maintaining the station's infrastructure, including a 670-acre (2.7 km^{2}) airfield, three active piers, 426 facilities and 806 family housing units.

From Naval Station Rota Spain, the VLF-transmitter Guardamar, which uses Torreta de Guardamar, the tallest man-made structure in the European Union as antenna, is telecontroled. Pest management is performed by a combination of Navy personnel, and local contractors who must be licensed by the host country (Spain).

== Occupants ==
The base is used jointly by Spain and the United States. It remains under the Spanish flag and is commanded by a Spanish Vice Admiral. While the Spanish Navy is responsible for external security of the base, both Navies are charged with internal security. NAVSTA Rota is technically a tenant facility of the Rota Spanish Navy base. As a result, certain US military customs are not observed, such as the display of a US Flag, which is only allowed during the annual Fourth of July celebration or occasionally at half mast as a mark of respect with the ad-hoc permission of the Spanish Admiral.

=== Spanish Navy ===
This Base houses the Fleet Headquarters and the Naval Action Force, as well as the main operational units of the Navy: Naval Action Group 2, Aircraft Flotilla, 41st Escort Squadron.

==== Deployed ships ====
- Naval Action Force
  - Naval Action Group 2
    - Juan Carlos I
    - Galicia
    - Castilla
  - Naval Action Group 1
    - 41st Escort Squadron
      - Santa María
      - Victoria
      - Numancia
      - Reina Sofía
      - Navarra
      - Canarias

=== U.S. Navy ===
Naval Station Rota provides support for U.S. and NATO ships; supports the safe and efficient movement of U.S. Navy and U.S. Air Force flights and passengers; and provides cargo, fuel, and ammunition to units in the region. The Naval Station is the only base in the Mediterranean capable of supporting Amphibious Readiness Group post-deployment wash-downs. The base port also offers secure, pier-side maintenance and back-load facilities. Rota supports Amphibious Readiness Group turnovers and hosts Sailors and Marines from visiting afloat units. The base also provides Quality of Life support to Morón Air Base, ARG support sites at Palma de Majorca, NATO headquarters in Madrid and the Military Sealift Command's Maritime Prepositioning Squadron 1.

The mission of U.S. Forces at Rota, as well as other U.S. Navy installations in the Mediterranean such as NAS Sigonella and Souda Air Base is to provide Command, Control and Logistics Support to US and NATO Operating Forces. These three facilities are undergoing a transformation from Maritime Patrol Aircraft airfields to multi-role "hubs" providing crucial air-links for USAF strategic airlift and mobility in support of US European Command (EUCOM), Central Command (CENTCOM) and African Area contingency operations under CENTCOM, EUCOM and the evolving Africa Command (AFRICOM).

==== Tenant Commands and Forward-deployed ships ====
- Destroyer Squadron 60 (COMDESRON 60)/Task Force 65 (CTF 65)
  - USS Roosevelt (DDG-80) (since 2020)
  - USS Arleigh Burke (DDG-51) (since 2021)
  - USS Bulkeley (DDG-84) (since 2022)
  - USS Paul Ignatius (DDG-117) (since 2022)
  - USS Oscar Austin (DDG-79) (since 2024)
- United States Navy Explosive Ordnance Disposal Mobile Unit Eight
- Helicopter Maritime Strike Squadron Seven Nine (HSM-79) "Griffins", Flying the Sikorsky MH-60R Seahawk

==== Former Commands and Forward-deployed ships ====
- USS Carney (DDG-64) (until 2020)
- USS Donald Cook (DDG-75) (until 2022)
- USS Porter (DDG-78) (until 2023)
- USS Ross (DDG-71) (until 2020)

=== Operational Headquarters for the EU Naval Force ===
The Operational Headquarters (OHQ) for the EU Naval Force moved from Northwood, UK to Rota and to Brest, France on 29 March 2019. EU's Operation Atalanta is commanded from Naval Station Rota.

== Gallery ==
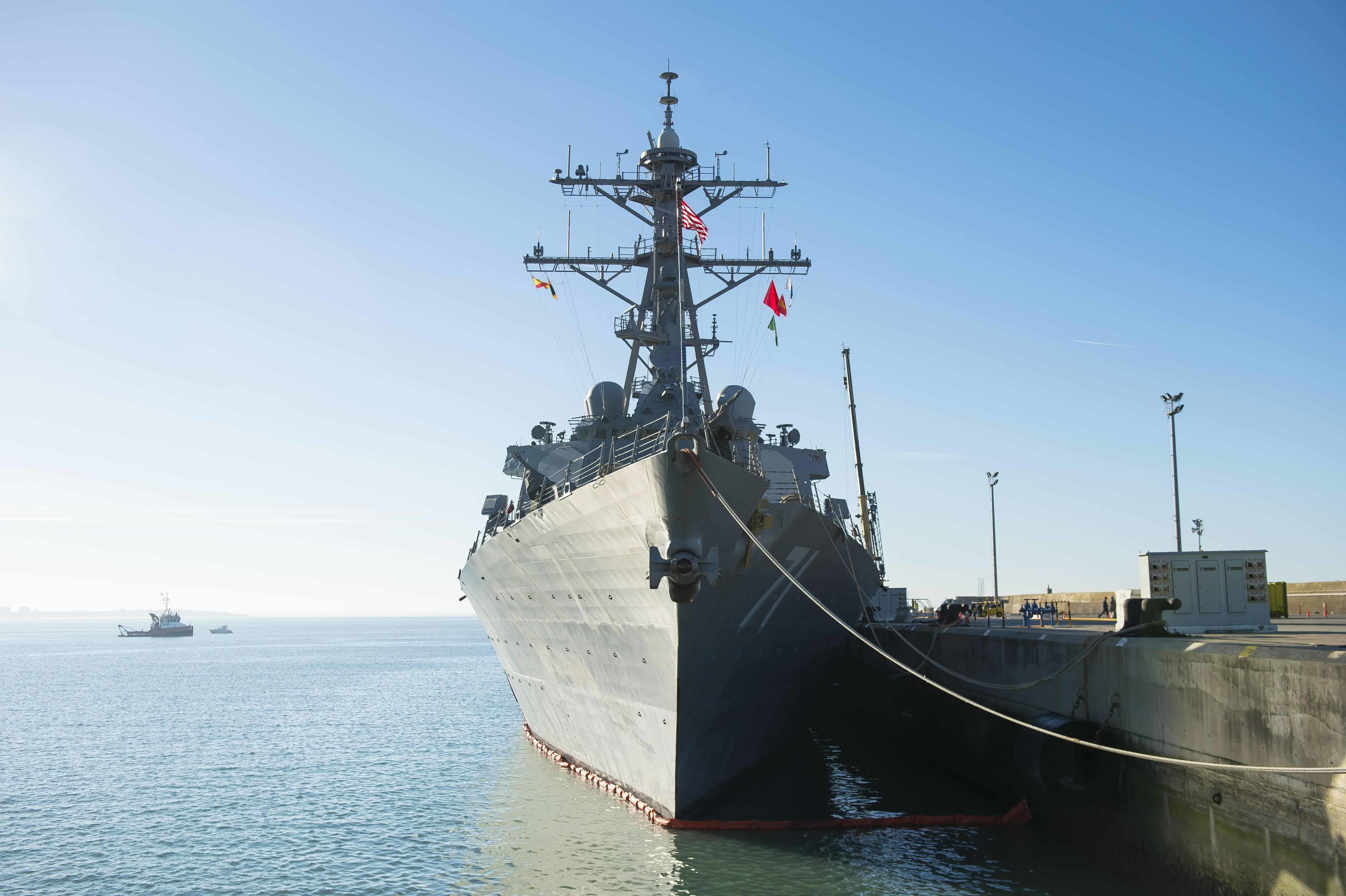
USS Ross Conducting Naval Operations

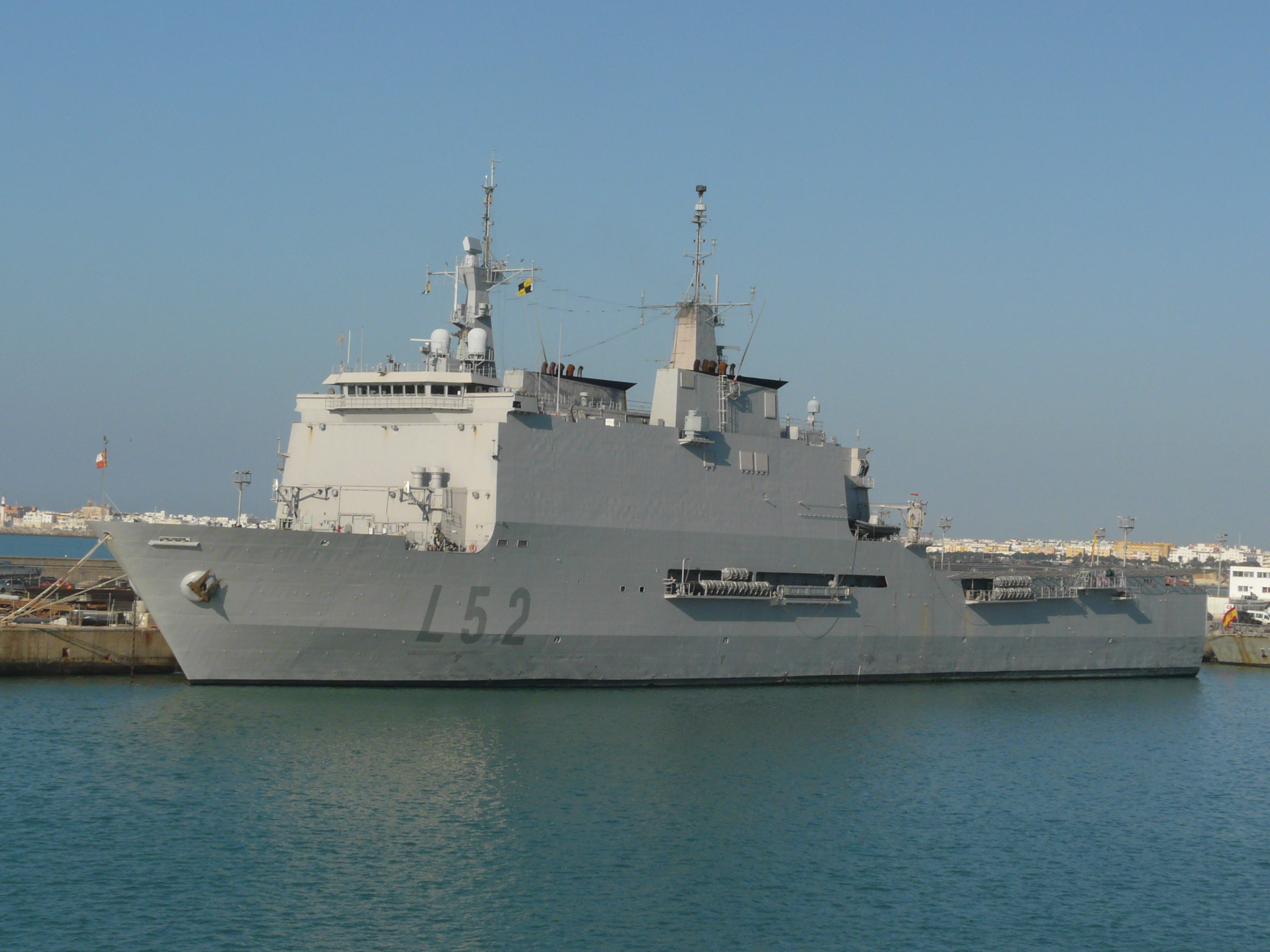
Galicia-class Castilla of the Spanish Navy based at Rota

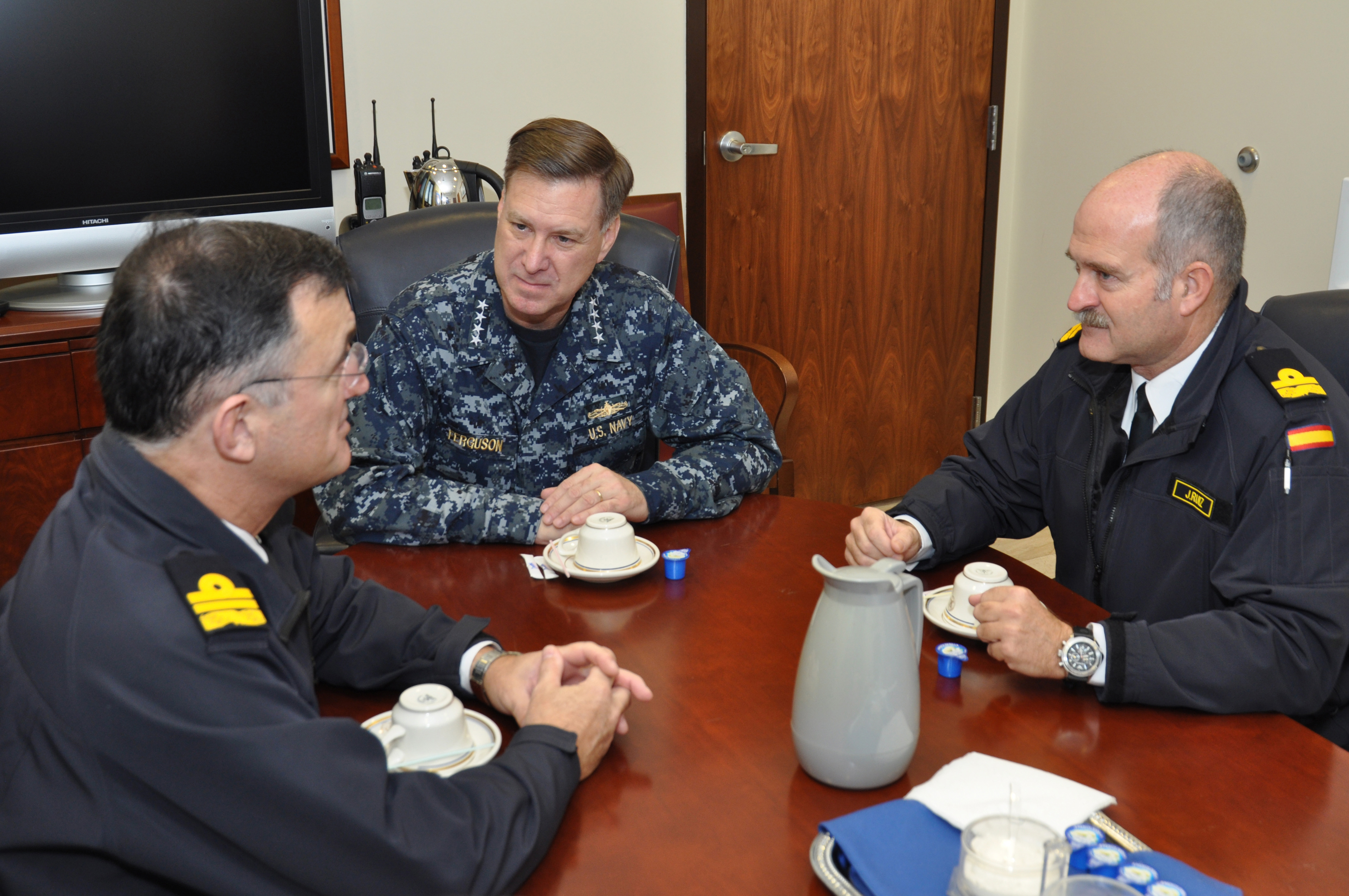
(VCNO) Adm. Mark Ferguson, center, meets with Spanish navy Vice Adm. Juan Rodriguez-Garat, left, and Spanish navy Rear Adm. Juan Ruiz-Casas at Naval Station Rota

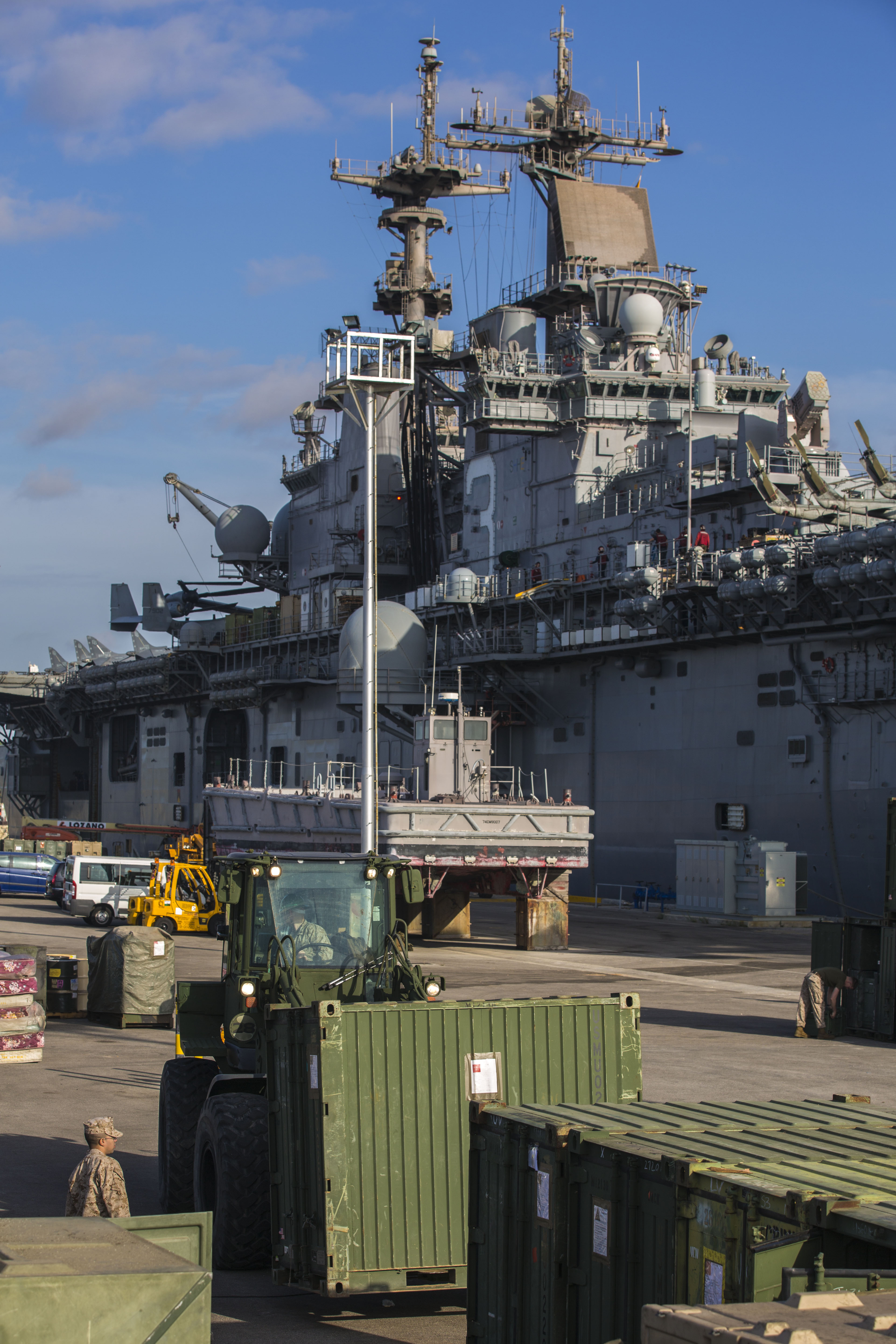
The USMC's 26th MEU at Naval Station Rota (USS Kearsarge)

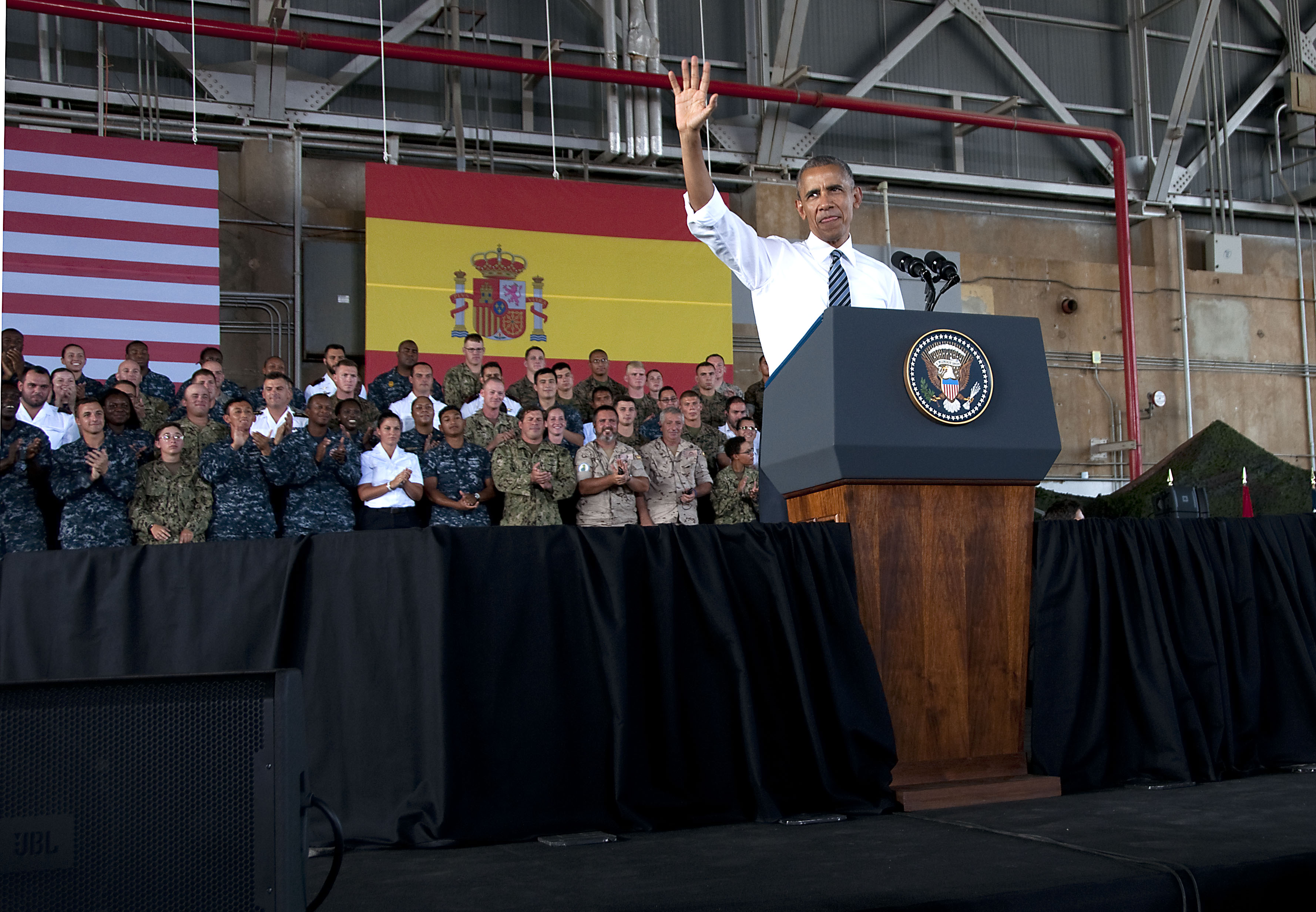
U.S. President Barack Obama during his official visit to Naval Station Rota in 2016.

== See also ==
- US Naval Advance Bases
- Morón Air Base
