= MV Golden Nori =

Japanese chemical tanker

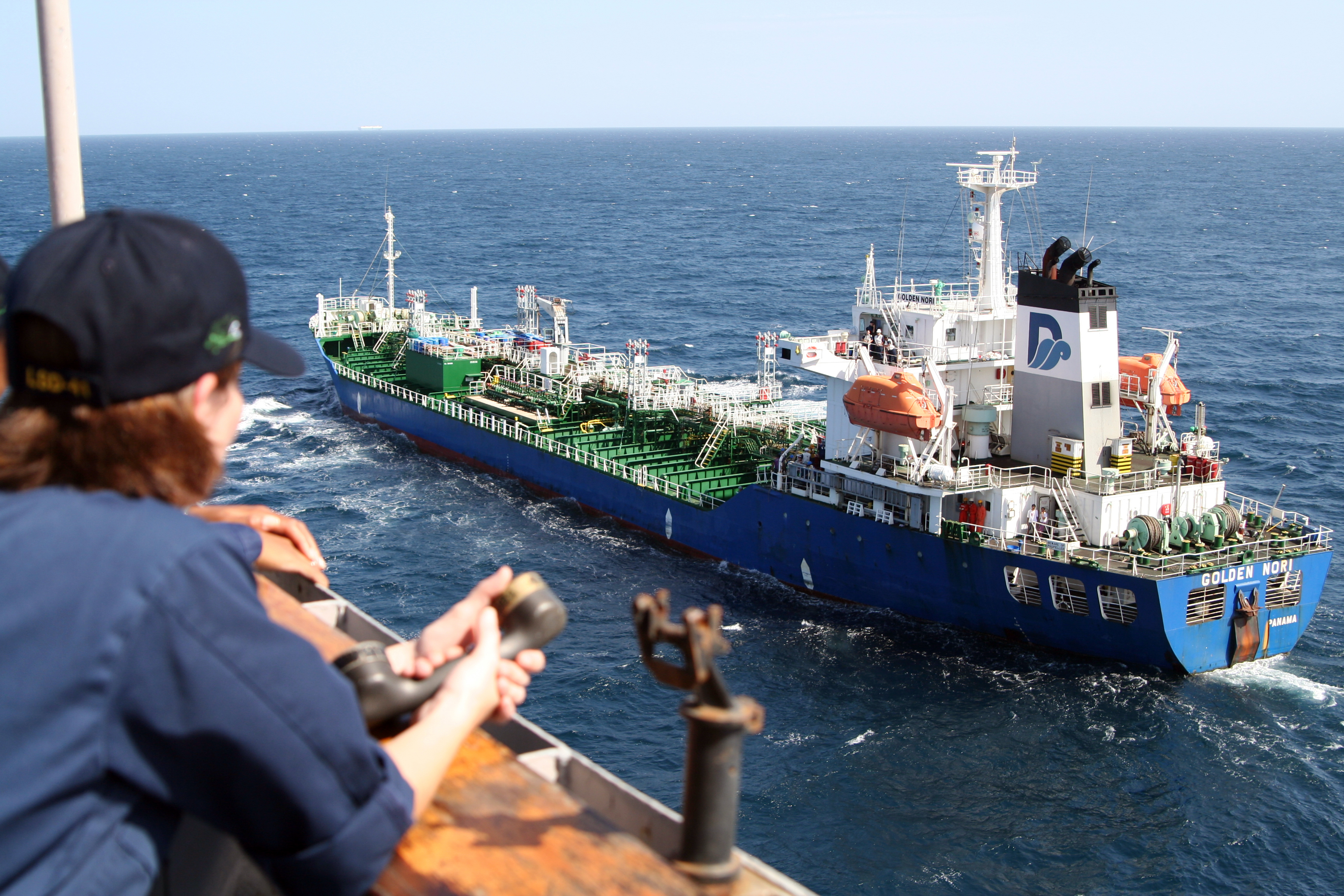
- MV Golden Nori comes alongside USS Whidbey Island for refueling following its release from Somalia-based pirates

History

Panama
- Operator: Dorval Kaiun Shipping
- Builder: Fukuoka Shipbuilding, Japan
- Launched: 27 November 1996
- Completed: 10 March 1997
- Identification: IMO number: 9151137; MMSI number: 355035000; Callsign: 3FBX7
- Status: In service

General characteristics
- Class & type: chemical tanker
- Tonnage: 11,676 DWT
- Length: 117 m (383 ft 10 in) (LOA)
- Beam: 20 m (65 ft 7 in)
- Draft: 8.75 m (28 ft 8 in)
- Speed: 13 knots (24 km/h)
- Capacity: 20 cargo tanks accommodating 78,884 bbl (3,313,100 US gal; 12,541,600 L) total
- Crew: 28

MV Golden Nori is a Japanese chemical tanker that was hijacked by pirates off the coast of Somalia on 28 October 2007. In news reports, she has at times been mistakenly referred to as the Golden Nory and Golden Mori. At the time of the hijacking the 23 person crew was composed of citizens of South Korea, the Philippines, and Myanmar. One of the South Korean crew members successfully escaped soon after being taken hostage.

== History ==
Golden Nori, which operates under a Panamanian flag, was reportedly seized by Somali pirates eight nautical miles off the coast of the East African nation. A radio distress call sent by the crew late on October 28 was received by the USS Porter. The United States Navy responded, sinking the pirates' skiffs. A few days later Capt. Restituto Bulilan was allowed to phone his family and the ship's owners to indicate that the crew was safe.

At the time she was hijacked, the cargo of the Golden Nori consisted of four different chemicals, including highly flammable benzene.

US and German naval vessels shadowed the captured vessel and blockaded from entering the port of Bosaso. Eventually, after demanding a ransom, the pirates freed the ship and its crew of 21 on December 12.
