= HSM-79 =

Helicopter Maritime Strike Squadron Seven Nine (HSM-79)
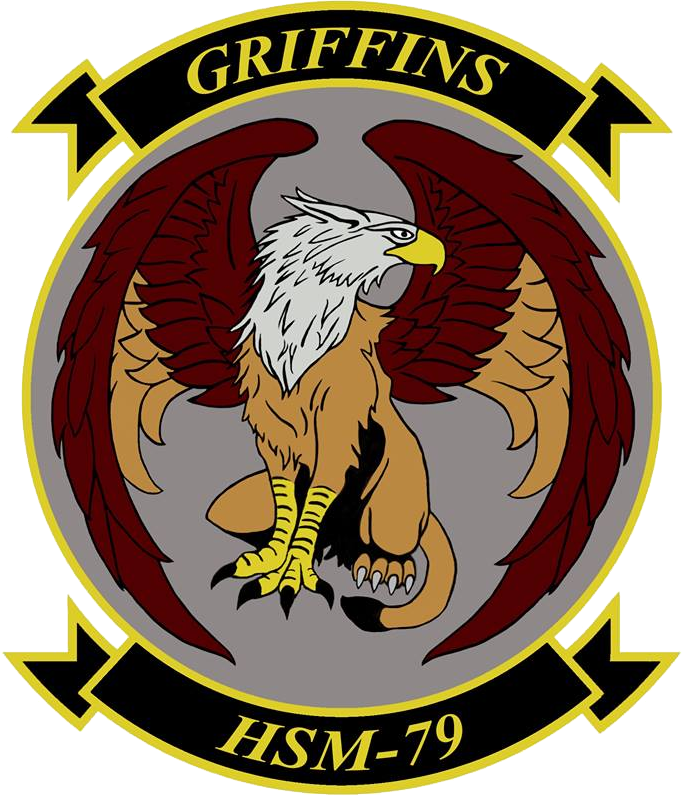
- HSM-79 Insignia
- Active: 2 June 2016 - present
- Country: United States of America
- Branch: United States Navy
- Type: Navy Helicopter Squadron
- Role: Surface Warfare (SUW); Anti-Submarine Warfare (ASW)
- Garrison/HQ: Naval Station Rota, Spain
- Nickname: "Griffins"

Commanders
- Current commander: N. Rongers

Helicopter Maritime Strike Squadron Seven Nine (HSM-79) "Griffins" is a United States Navy helicopter squadron based at Naval Base Rota, Rota, Spain. Their radio callsign is "Sentinel".

The squadron operates the Sikorsky MH-60R Seahawk and provides aircraft detachments to the surface force ships which are forward deployed to the Sixth Fleet.
