= Action of 28 October 2007 =

US military confrontation with Somali pirates

- Part of the Piracy off the coast of Somalia
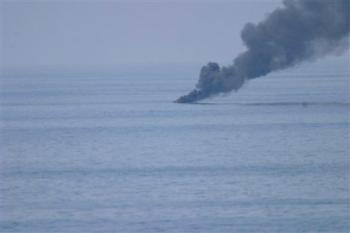
- Skiff burning after taking 25 mm rounds
Date	28 October 2007
Location	Gulf of Aden, off Socotra
Result	U.S. victory, captured vessels freed

Belligerents
United States	Somali Pirates

Strength
2 destroyers	1 tanker 2 skiffs

Casualties and losses
None	2 skiffs sunk

The action of 28 October 2007 occurred when United States Navy units acted to interdict Somali piracy in the Indian Ocean region.

== Background ==
After a decrease in piracy in the first half of 2007, Somali pirates rebounded and again started to increase their attacks on shipping off the coast of Somalia. On 28 October 2007, pirates hijacked the Japanese tanker Golden Nori, eight nautical miles (15 km) off the Somali coast.

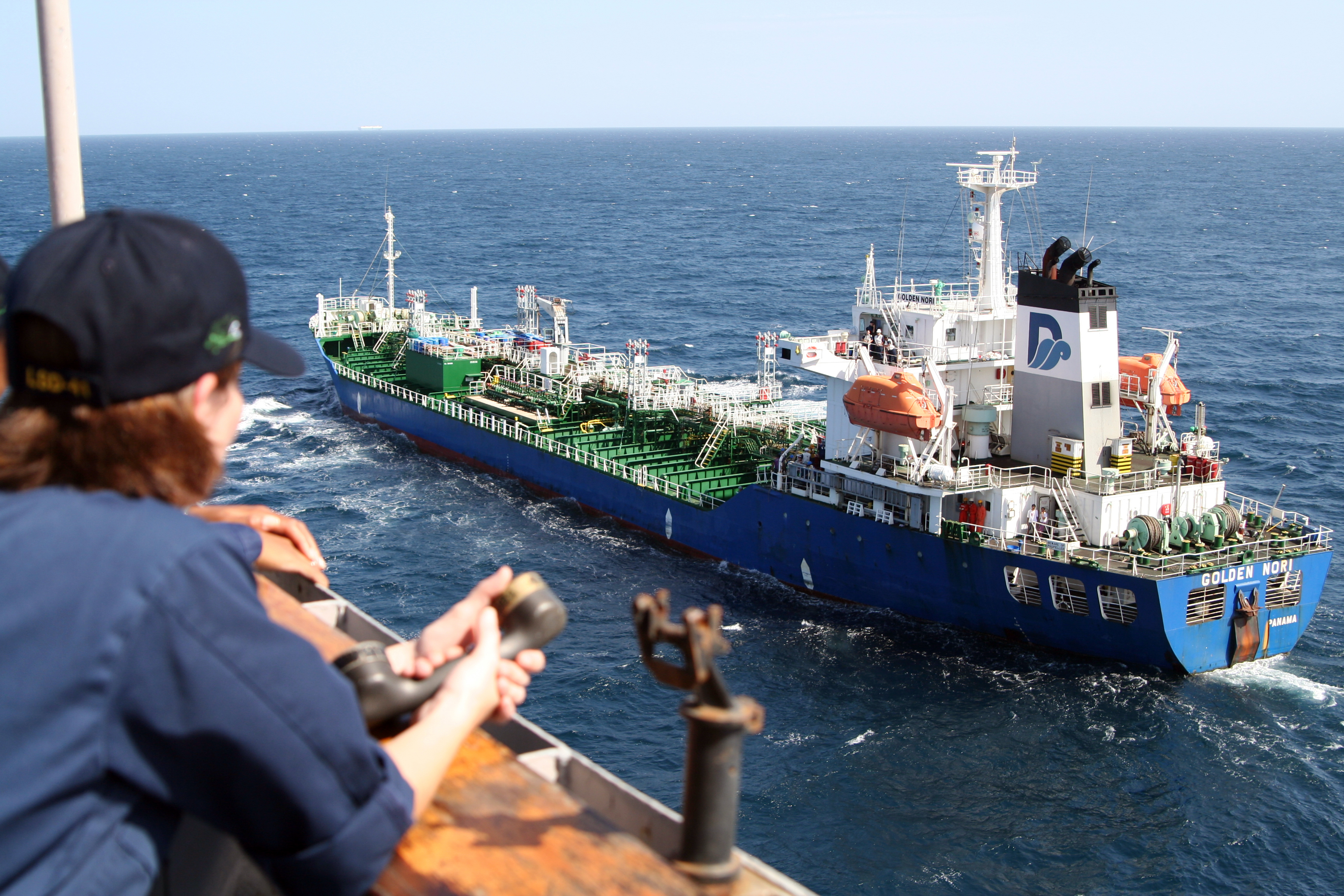
MV Golden Nori was refueled after being released

== Military confrontation ==
After receiving a distress call, USS Porter, an American Arleigh Burke-class destroyer, arrived at the scene and attacked and sank two skiffs being towed by the tanker. The tanker's owner and operator, Dorval Kaiun Shipping, reported that its cargo consisted of four kinds of chemicals, including highly flammable benzene. The United States Fifth Fleet spokesperson, Lydia Roberts, stated, "we were aware of what was on the ship when we fired".

As the hijacked tanker continued underway, Porter's sister ship USS Arleigh Burke received authorization from Somali authorities to pursue it. This is the first incident of Somali piracy where the United States Navy was given permission for pursuit within Somali territorial waters. The Navy continued to shadow the vessel through October and November, 2007. One of the crewmembers escaped from the ship and made it to safety, angering the pirates and complicating the situation even further.

In November negotiations started for the tanker's release, but by 4 December Golden Nori had been cornered in the port of Bosasso by two American ships and one German ship. Coalition forces called on the pirates to surrender, threatening them with military force if the standoff continued. The pirates in return demanded one million dollars in ransom or else they would kill all 21 members of the crew. On 12 December, the pirates left the vessel for the coast and set the crew free. It is still unclear if the pirates received their demanded ransom, or left simply because of the pressure applied by the coalition.

== Similar incident ==
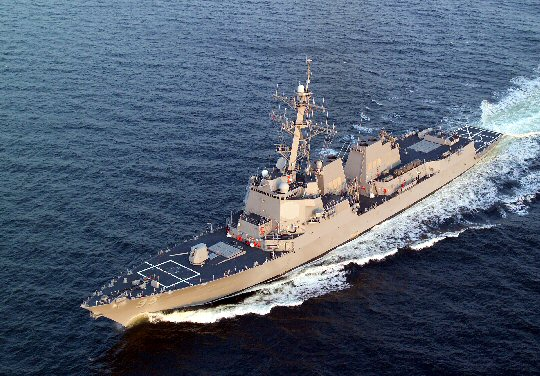
USS James E. Williams

Another hijacking in the same region occurred late on 29 October when gunmen attacked the North Korean freighter Dai Hong Dan. A helicopter from USS James E. Williams, responding to a telephoned report of a hijacking, flew over the freighter on 30 October and radioed a demand for the attackers to surrender. The freighter's crew subsequently overwhelmed the gunmen, killing at least one and detaining the rest. With the permission of the freighter's crew, US Navy forces boarded the freighter to treat the wounded, which included three crewmen and three pirates. This hijacking may not have been the work of indiscriminate area pirates; the hijackers are believed to be security guards hired by the freighter's shipping agent.
