= USS Arleigh Burke =

Arleigh Burke-class destroyer

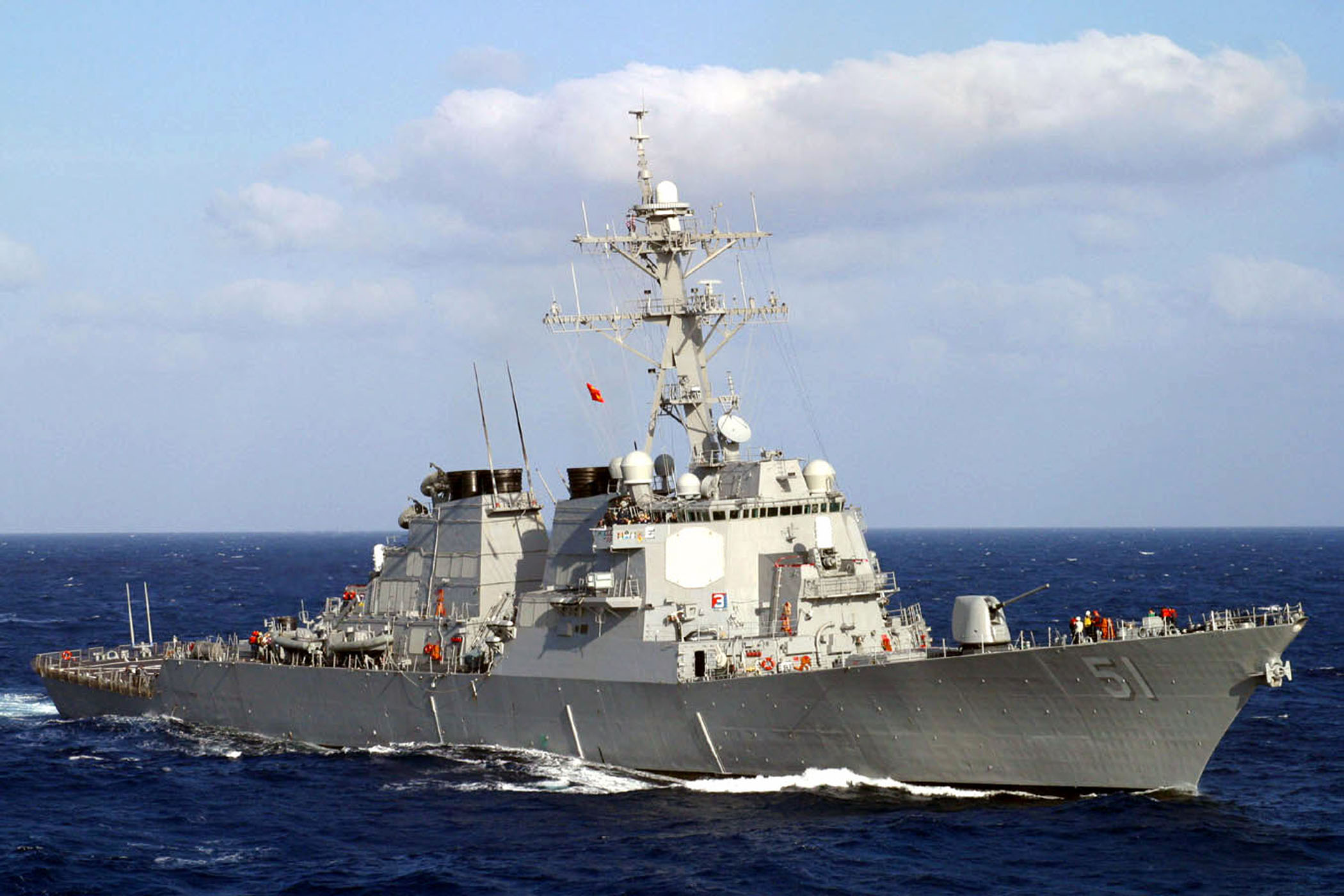
- USS Arleigh Burke (DDG-51)

History

United States
- Name: Arleigh Burke
- Namesake: Arleigh Albert Burke
- Ordered: 2 April 1985
- Builder: Bath Iron Works
- Laid down: 6 December 1988
- Launched: 16 September 1989
- Commissioned: 4 July 1991
- Home port: Rota
- Identification: MMSI number: 366986000; Callsign: NBRK; Hull number: DDG-51
- Motto: Fast and Feared
- Status: in active service
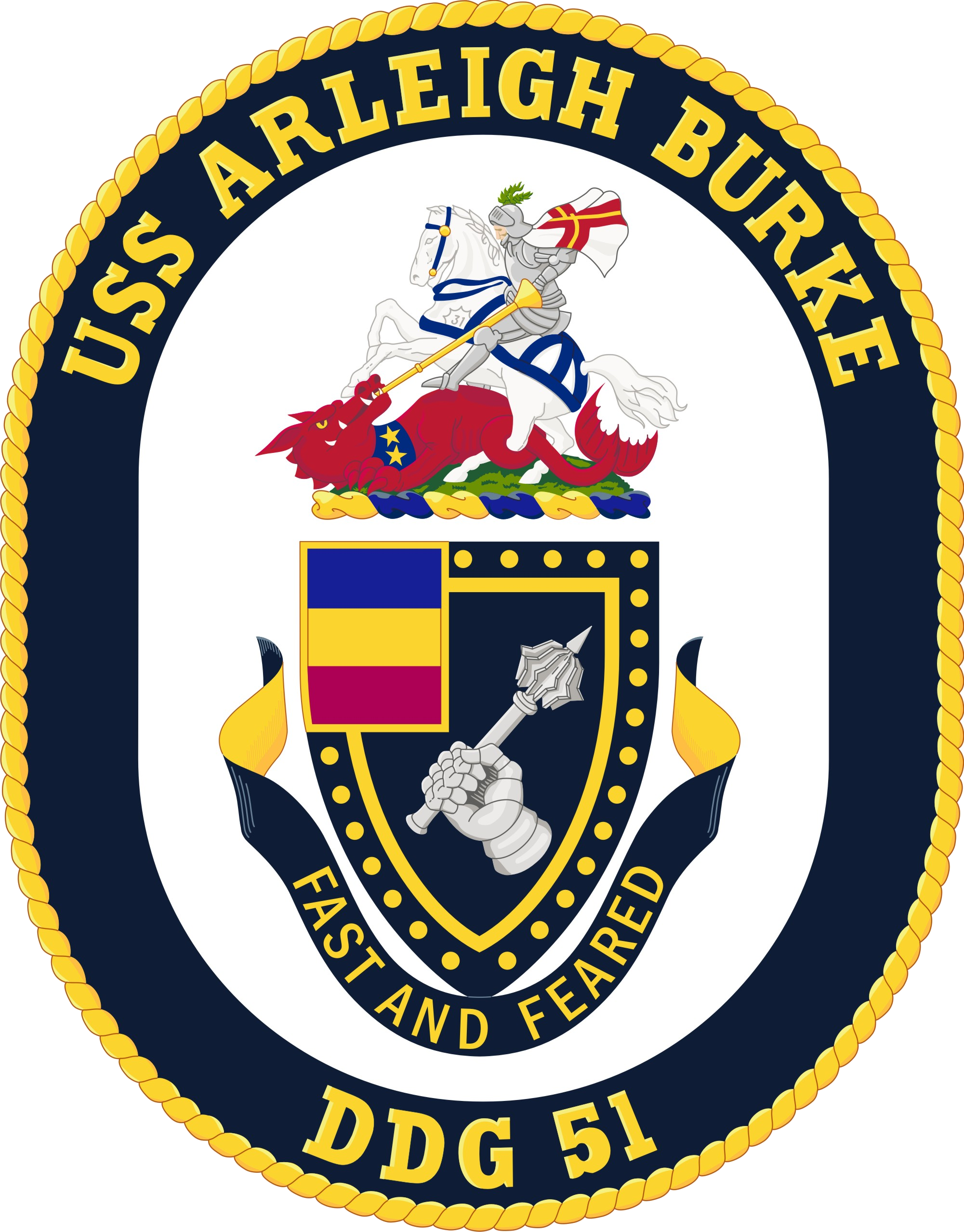
- Badge

General characteristics
- Class & type: Arleigh Burke-class destroyer
- Displacement: Light: approx. 6,800 long tons (6,900 t); Full: approx. 8,900 long tons (9,000 t)
- Length: 505 ft (154 m)
- Beam: 59 ft (18 m)
- Draft: 31 ft (9.4 m)
- Installed power: 4 × General Electric LM2500-30 gas turbines; 100,000 shp (75,000 kW)
- Propulsion: 2 × shafts
- Speed: In excess of 30 kn (56 km/h; 35 mph)
- Range: 4,400 nmi (8,100 km; 5,100 mi) at 20 kn (37 km/h; 23 mph)
- Complement: 33 commissioned officers; 38 chief petty officers; 210 enlisted personnel
- Sensors & processing systems: AN/SPY-1D PESA 3D radar (Flight I, II, IIA); AN/SPY-6(V)1 AESA 3D radar (Flight III); AN/SPS-67(V)3 or (V)5 surface search radar (DDG-51 – DDG-118); AN/SPQ-9B surface search radar (DDG-119 onward); AN/SPS-73(V)12 surface search/navigation radar (DDG-51 – DDG-86); BridgeMaster E surface search/navigation radar (DDG-87 onward); 3 × AN/SPG-62 fire-control radar; Mk 46 optical sight system (Flight I, II, IIA); Mk 20 electro-optical sight system (Flight III); AN/SQQ-89 ASW combat system: AN/SQS-53C sonar array; AN/SQR-19 tactical towed array sonar (Flight I, II, IIA); TB-37U multi-function towed array sonar (DDG-113 onward); AN/SQQ-28 LAMPS III shipboard system
- Electronic warfare & decoys: AN/SLQ-32 electronic warfare suite; AN/SLQ-25 Nixie torpedo countermeasures; Mk 36 Mod 12 decoy launching systems; Mk 53 Nulka decoy launching systems; Mk 59 decoy launching systems
- Armament: Guns: 1 × 5-inch (127 mm)/54 mk 45 mod 1/2 (lightweight gun); 1 × 20 mm (0.8 in) Phalanx CIWS; 2 × 25 mm (0.98 in) Mk 38 machine gun system; 4 × 0.50 inches (12.7 mm) caliber guns; Missiles: 2 × Mk 141 Harpoon anti-ship missile launcher; 1 × SeaRAM CIWS; 1 × 29-cell, 1 × 61-cell (90 total cells) Mk 41 vertical launching system (VLS): RIM-66M surface-to-air missile; RIM-156 surface-to-air missile; RIM-161 anti-ballistic missile; BGM-109 Tomahawk cruise missile; RUM-139 vertical launch ASROC; Torpedoes: 2 × Mark 32 triple torpedo tubes: Mark 46 lightweight torpedo; Mark 50 lightweight torpedo; Mark 54 lightweight torpedo
- Aircraft carried: 1 × Sikorsky MH-60R

USS Arleigh Burke (DDG-51), named for Admiral Arleigh A. Burke, USN (1901–1996), is the lead ship of the Arleigh Burke class of Aegis guided missile destroyer. She is of the Flight I variant. She was laid down by the Bath Iron Works company at Bath, Maine, on 6 December 1988; launched on 16 September 1989; and commissioned on 4 July 1991.

Arleigh Burke's designers incorporated many lessons learned by the Royal Navy during the Falklands campaign and from the Ticonderoga-class guided-missile cruisers. The Ticonderoga-class cruisers were becoming too expensive to continue building and too difficult to upgrade. Arleigh Burke was the first modern destroyer designed with features meant to lower its radar cross-section, which improves a ship's ability to evade radar detection. She also used a slightly downgraded version of the Aegis Combat System, which allows for launching, tracking, and evading missiles simultaneously. Her all-steel construction provides good protection for her superstructure, while her Collective Protection System allows her to operate in environments contaminated by chemical, biological, or radiological materials.

== History ==
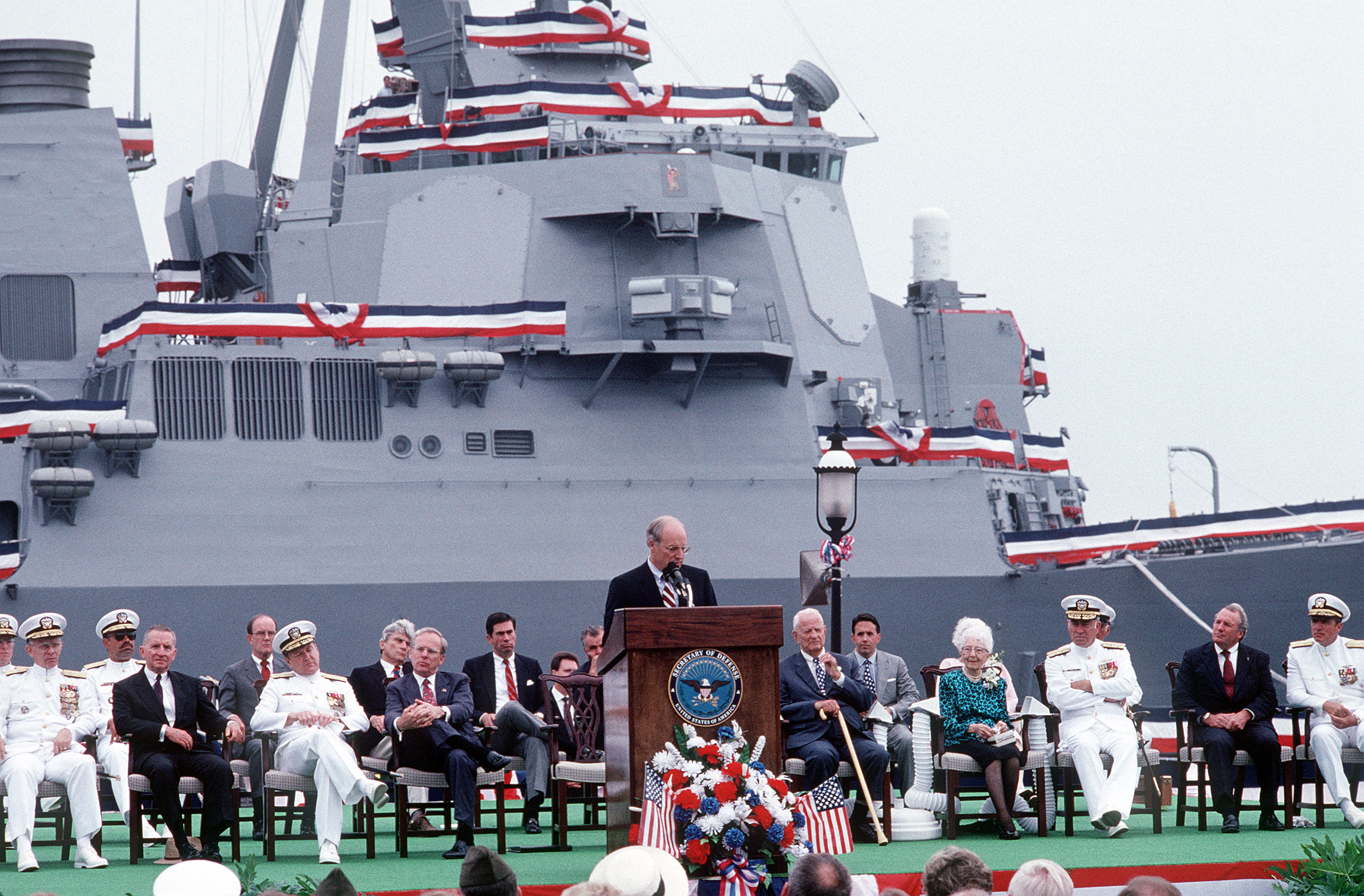
Secretary of Defense Dick Cheney delivering the keynote address during the commissioning ceremony for Arleigh Burke, 4 July 1991

Before Arleigh Burke was commissioned, the Commander, Operational Test and Evaluation Force was involved in the initial phases of testing. New systems, operated by fleet sailors ashore, were examined at land-based test facilities. The combat systems testing took place at the Combat System Engineering Development Site in Moorestown, New Jersey. The propulsion plant testing occurred at the Gas Turbine Ship Land-Based Engineering Site in Philadelphia, Pennsylvania. These test results supported the acquisition decision to begin limited production of the ship class.

The ship was launched on 16 September 1989 by Mrs. Roberta (Gorsuch) Burke. Admiral Burke was present in person at her commissioning ceremony on 4 July, which was held on the waterfront in downtown Norfolk, Virginia.

=== 1990s ===
After being commissioned and throughout 1992, Arleigh Burke conducted extensive testing at sea. As is often the case with new ship classes, U.S. Navy officers and shipyard engineers encountered a number of problems with some shipboard systems that required the attention of the warship's design and production agencies. An additional phase of testing was added to verify the effectiveness of the modifications made to these systems—modifications incorporated into later destroyers of the Arleigh Burke class.

Following her initial operational testing, Arleigh Burke was deployed to the Mediterranean Sea and the Adriatic Sea in 1993, serving as the "Green Crown" during Operation Provide Promise. During her second deployment in 1995, Arleigh Burke steamed in the Mediterranean Sea as the "Red Crown" in support of the No-Fly Zone over Bosnia and Herzegovina. During her third cruise, in 1998, she steamed in the Mediterranean Sea, Adriatic Sea, Red Sea, and Black Sea, as a participant in numerous American and Allied exercises.

=== 2000 ===
During her fourth cruise in 2000–2001, Arleigh Burke saw service in the Mediterranean and Red Seas and in the Persian Gulf, enforcing United Nations sanctions against Iraq and conducting exercises with allied naval partners.

=== 2003 ===
On her fifth deployment in 2003, Arleigh Burke and the other units of the Theodore Roosevelt-led carrier battle group participated in Operation Enduring Freedom and Operation Iraqi Freedom. During this wartime cruise, Arleigh Burke fired Tomahawk missile strikes against targets in Iraq, escorted merchant ships and naval auxiliaries through geographic choke points, and carried out "leadership interdiction" operations in the northern Arabian Sea. She also undertook counter-piracy missions in the Gulf of Aden. This cruise, which lasted from January through June 2003, saw Arleigh Burke at sea over 92 percent of the time.

In March 2003, she was assigned to Destroyer Squadron 2.

Arleigh Burke has earned one Navy Unit Commendation, three Meritorious Unit Commendations, three Battle Efficiency E Awards, the National Defense Service Medal, the Armed Forces Expeditionary Medal, the Kuwait Liberation Medal, and five Sea Service Deployment Ribbons.

As a member of Destroyer Squadron 22, Arleigh Burke operated with the George H.W. Bush Carrier Strike Group under the direction of the Commander, Carrier Group 2.

=== 2007 ===
In May 2007, Arleigh Burke ran what the Navy called a "soft aground" off Cape Henry Light at the entrance to the Chesapeake Bay. Her captain, Commander Esther J. McClure, was relieved of her command shortly thereafter as a result of a "loss of confidence in her ability to command".

In October 2007, Arleigh Burke was involved in anti-pirate operations in Somalia.

=== 2009 ===
In 2009, Arleigh Burke was deployed to the eastern coast of Africa in support of AFRICOM's Africa Partnership Station. The ship represented the United States during a port visit to the island nation of Seychelles where they played a role in securing a status of forces agreement between the two countries.

=== 2010 ===
In August 2010, Arleigh Burke entered the BAE Systems Ship Repair shipyard in Norfolk, Virginia for DDG Modernization, a program to upgrade the ship's systems and to extend the service life to 40 years.

=== 2014 ===
On 23 September 2014, Arleigh Burke took part in the 2014 military intervention against ISIS, firing Tomahawk missiles on targets in Syria while the ship was in the Red Sea.

=== 2018 ===
In 2018, the ship made two three-month overseas deployments, returning to Norfolk, Virginia, between cruises.

=== 2019 ===
In 2019, she entered General Dynamics NASSCO's shipyard in Norfolk, Virginia, for continued work towards modernization for ballistic missile defense.

=== 2021 ===
In March 2021, during the COVID-19 pandemic, Arleigh Burke transited the Atlantic Ocean and conducted a home port shift to Rota, Spain, joining the Forward Deployed Naval Forces in Europe as part of Destroyer Squadron 60. Prior to the port shift, she received extensive upgrades, including Aegis Baseline 9 for BMD capability, as well as replacing her aft Phalanx CIWS with a SeaRAM CIWS. The ship crossed the Arctic Circle in May 2021.

The crew began their first forward-deployed patrol in August 2021, returning in December 2021. During 2021, Arleigh Burke sailed more than 44,000 miles, circumnavigated Europe, and executed operations in the Baltic Sea, Black Sea, Mediterranean Sea, Barents Sea, Atlantic Ocean, and Arctic Ocean. Port calls included Tallinn, Estonia; Helsinki, Finland; Gdynia, Poland; Varna, Bulgaria; Constanta, Romania; and Golcuk, Turkey.

=== 2022 ===
In March 2022, Arleigh Burke was selected as the 2021 Battle E Winner for Destroyer Squadron 60. The Battle "E" recognizes the top ship in each squadron and is awarded for demonstrating sustained superior performance, operational effectiveness, and continuous readiness.

In April 2022, Arleigh Burke completed the largest maintenance availability ever conducted in Rota, Spain, and then commenced her second forward-deployed patrol in May 2022.

On 9 July 2022, Arleigh Burke arrived in Riga for a scheduled port visit.

=== 2024 ===
On 13–14 April 2024, Arleigh Burke and USS Carney shot down at least six Iranian ballistic missiles during the 2024 Iranian strikes in Israel.

== Crest ==
The shield outlined in blue and gold stands for the achievements in battle of Admiral Burke against the naval power of Japan. The fist and mace symbolize the offensive and defensive power of the new destroyer. The mace, also a symbol of authority, represents Admiral Burke's service as Chief of Naval Operations. It also refers to Admiral Marc Mitscher, an influential figure and mentor for whom Admiral Burke served as chief of staff. Admiral Burke's Destroyer Squadron 23, represented by the border of 23 ovals, was the only United States Destroyer Squadron awarded a Presidential Unit Citation, signified by the canton of blue, yellow, and red. The ovals also refer to the year 1923, in which Midshipman Burke graduated from the United States Naval Academy at Annapolis. Twenty-three also reflects Admiral Burke's distinguished service on the staff of the Chief of Naval Operations as (OP-23).

The mounted figure of Saint George recalls Admiral Burke's celebrated victory in the Battle of Cape St. George over Japanese naval forces. His mantle bears a gold cross for the Navy Cross awarded to the admiral. The birch branch on the helmet represents Admiral Burke himself, a reference to his name derived from his Scandinavian heritage.

The red sea dragon symbolizes Japanese naval power assaulted by forces under Captain Burke's command. It is gorged with the two gold stars he was awarded for outstanding service. The lance impaling the dragon signifies ordnance on target. The capabilities of the new destroyer, the most powerful and survivable ever built, are signified by the full armor and equipment of the warrior Saint George. The admiral's nickname "31-Knot Burke" is recalled by the number "31" on the horse.

The motto of the ship is "Fast and Feared". The ship's crest was designed by John Sproston of the Institute of Heraldry following a personal interview with Admiral Burke. The crest can also be found on a United States Postal Service postage stamp honoring Admiral Burke that was issued in 2010.

== Awards ==
Arleigh Burke has earned the following awards during her service career.

- Navy Unit Commendation - (2003, 2007, 2014)
- Meritorious Unit Commendation - (1998, 2001, 2018, 2022)
- Battle Efficiency E Award - (1992, 1995, 1996, 1998, 1999, 2001, 2014, 2021)
- National Defense Service Medal (second)
- Armed Forces Expeditionary Medal
- Kuwait Liberation Medal
- Armed Forces Service Medal - (2022)
- Humanitarian Service Medal - (2021)
- Sea Service Ribbon - 13
- Overseas Service Ribbon

== In popular culture ==
- Arleigh Burke was featured in the opening credits of the television series JAG. She also appeared as USS Cayuga in the 1997 JAG episode "Cowboys and Cossacks"., and the 1996 episode "Ares" as USS Daniel Boone.
- Arleigh Burke was used to film the at-sea scenes in the 2003 NCIS episode "The Immortals".
- Filming for Season 3 of the Amazon TV show Jack Ryan took place onboard Arleigh Burke in October 2021. Scenes were filmed in the ship's pilot house and the Commanding Officer's Cabin with actor John Krasinski.
