= USS Porter (DDG-78) =

Arleigh Burke-class destroyer

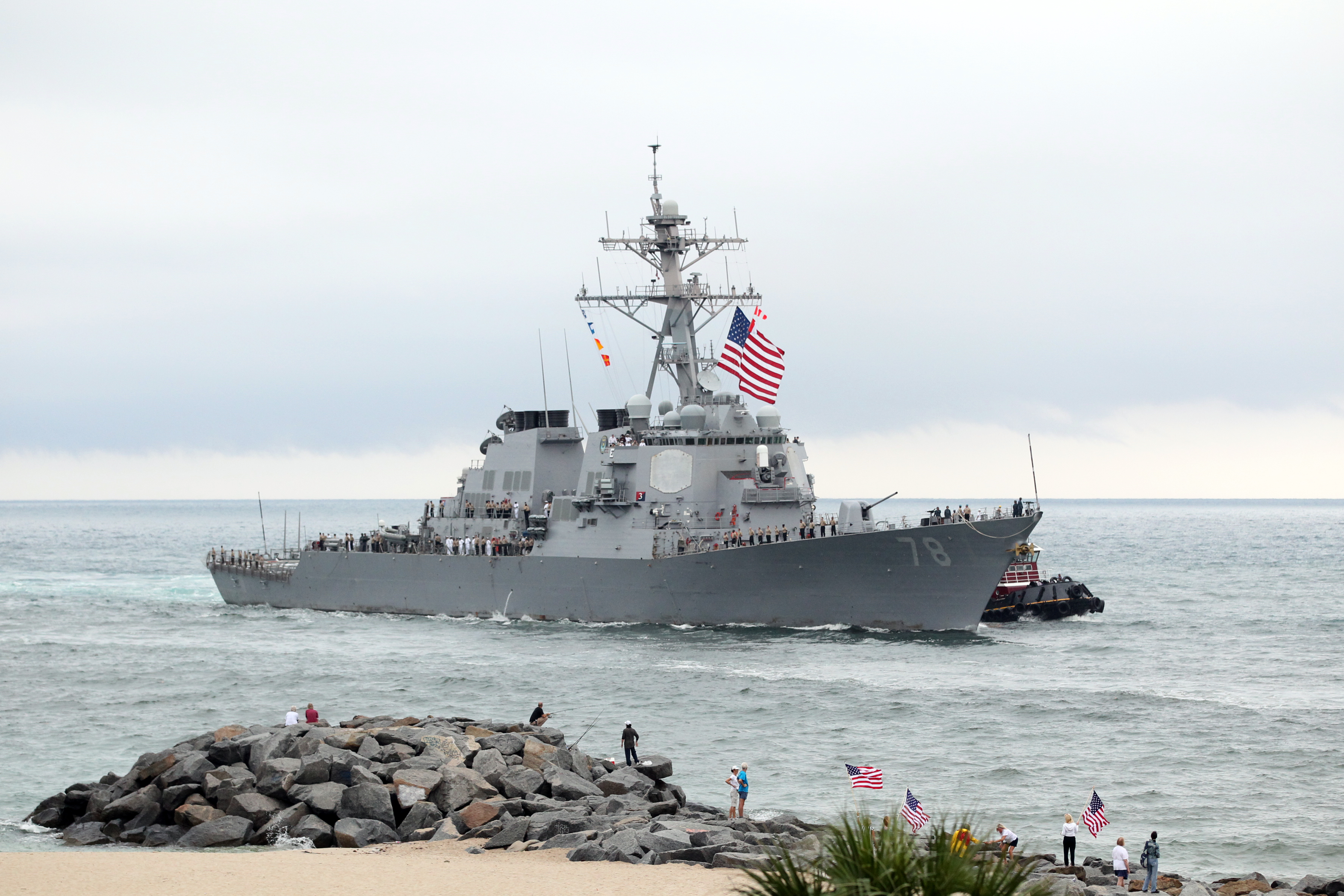
- USS Porter (DDG-78), on 26 April 2010

History

United States
- Name: Porter
- Namesake: David Dixon Porter; David Porter
- Ordered: 20 July 1994
- Builder: Ingalls Shipbuilding
- Laid down: 2 December 1996
- Launched: 12 November 1997
- Acquired: 11 January 1999
- Commissioned: 20 March 1999
- Home port: Norfolk
- Identification: MMSI number: 366974000; Callsign: NPOR; Hull number: DDG-78
- Motto: Freedom's Champion
- Status: in active service
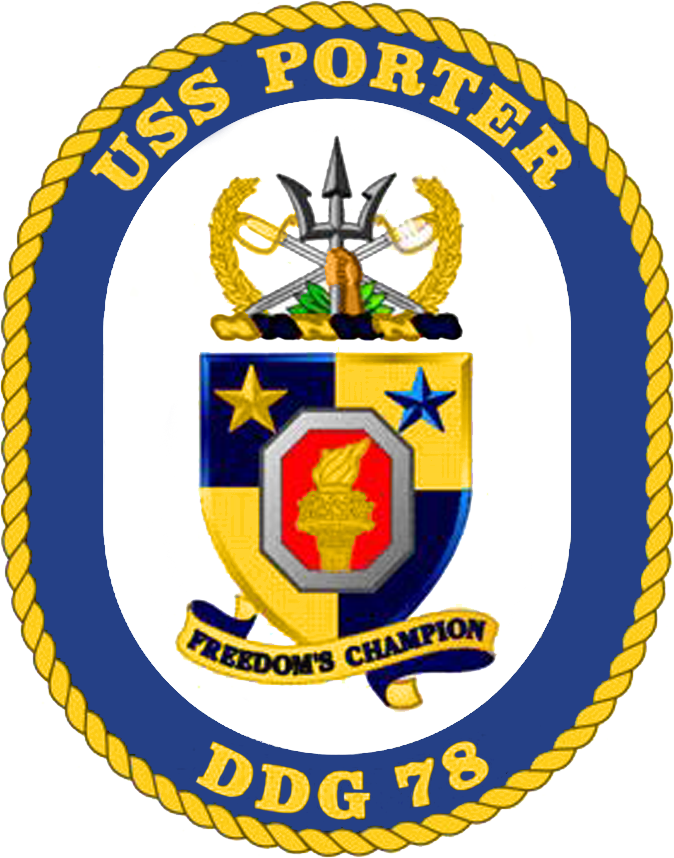
- Badge

General characteristics
- Class & type: Arleigh Burke-class destroyer
- Displacement: 8,637 long tons (8,776 t) (Full load)
- Length: 505 ft (154 m)
- Beam: 59 ft (18 m)
- Draft: 31 ft (9.4 m)
- Installed power: 4 × General Electric LM2500-30 gas turbines; 100,000 shp (75,000 kW)
- Propulsion: 2 × shafts
- Speed: In excess of 30 kn (56 km/h; 35 mph)
- Range: 4,400 nmi (8,100 km; 5,100 mi) at 20 kn (37 km/h; 23 mph)
- Complement: 33 commissioned officers; 38 chief petty officers; 210 enlisted personnel
- Sensors & processing systems: AN/SPY-1D PESA 3D radar (Flight I, II, IIA); AN/SPY-6(V)1 AESA 3D radar (Flight III); AN/SPS-67(V)3 or (V)5 surface search radar (DDG-51 – DDG-118); AN/SPQ-9B surface search radar (DDG-119 onward); AN/SPS-73(V)12 surface search/navigation radar (DDG-51 – DDG-86); BridgeMaster E surface search/navigation radar (DDG-87 onward); 3 × AN/SPG-62 fire-control radar; Mk 46 optical sight system (Flight I, II, IIA); Mk 20 electro-optical sight system (Flight III); AN/SQQ-89 ASW combat system: AN/SQS-53C sonar array; AN/SQR-19 tactical towed array sonar (Flight I, II, IIA); TB-37U multi-function towed array sonar (DDG-113 onward); AN/SQQ-28 LAMPS III shipboard system
- Electronic warfare & decoys: AN/SLQ-32 electronic warfare suite; AN/SLQ-25 Nixie torpedo countermeasures; Mk 36 Mod 12 decoy launching systems; Mk 53 Nulka decoy launching systems; Mk 59 decoy launching systems
- Armament: Guns: 1 × 5-inch (127 mm)/54 mk 45 mod 1/2 (lightweight gun); 1 × 20 mm (0.8 in) Phalanx CIWS; 2 × 25 mm (0.98 in) Mk 38 machine gun system; 4 × 0.50 inches (12.7 mm) caliber guns; Missiles: 2 × Mk 141 Harpoon anti-ship missile launcher; 1 × SeaRAM CIWS; 1 × 29-cell, 1 × 61-cell (90 total cells) Mk 41 vertical launching system (VLS): RIM-66M surface-to-air missile; RIM-156 surface-to-air missile; RIM-161 anti-ballistic missile; BGM-109 Tomahawk cruise missile; RUM-139 vertical launch ASROC; Torpedoes: 2 × Mark 32 triple torpedo tubes: Mark 46 lightweight torpedo; Mark 50 lightweight torpedo; Mark 54 lightweight torpedo
- Aircraft carried: 1 × Sikorsky MH-60R

USS Porter (DDG-78) is an Arleigh Burke-class (Flight II) Aegis guided missile destroyer in the United States Navy and is the last of the Flight II variant. Porter is the fifth US Navy ship to be named after US Navy officers Commodore David Porter, and his son, Admiral David Dixon Porter. Porter was the 12th ship of this class to be built at Ingalls Shipbuilding in Pascagoula, Mississippi. She was laid down on 2 December 1996, launched and christened on 12 November 1997, and commissioned 20 March 1999, in Port Canaveral, Florida.

== Service history ==
=== OEF/OIF ===
From January to July 2003, Porter engaged in combat and support operations of Operation Enduring Freedom, Operation Iraqi Freedom, and Joint Task Force (JTF) Cobra. Porter launched Tomahawk missiles during the Dora Farms and Shock and Awe stages of the Iraq War. Porter also worked with the Israeli Defense Force (IDF) off the coast of Israel while some Porter sailors worked with the IDF from the Nevatim base in the Negev desert of Southern Israel.

=== Piracy ===
On 28 October 2007, Porter attacked and sank two pirate skiffs off Somalia after receiving a distress call from the tanker MV Golden Nori which was under attack from pirates.

=== 2009 upgrade ===
On 12 November 2009, the Missile Defense Agency announced that Porter would be upgraded during fiscal year 2013 to RIM-161 Standard Missile 3 (SM-3) capability in order to function as part of the Aegis Ballistic Missile Defense System. In 2016 the aft CIWS mount was replaced by a SeaRAM missile system.

=== Operation Nanook 2010 ===
In August 2010, Porter and the United States Coast Guard buoy tender USCGC Alder participated in Operation Nanook 2010 in Baffin Bay and the Davis Straits. This was the fourth annual Operation Nanook organized by the Canadian Government, but it was the first to host foreign vessels.

=== 2012 collision ===
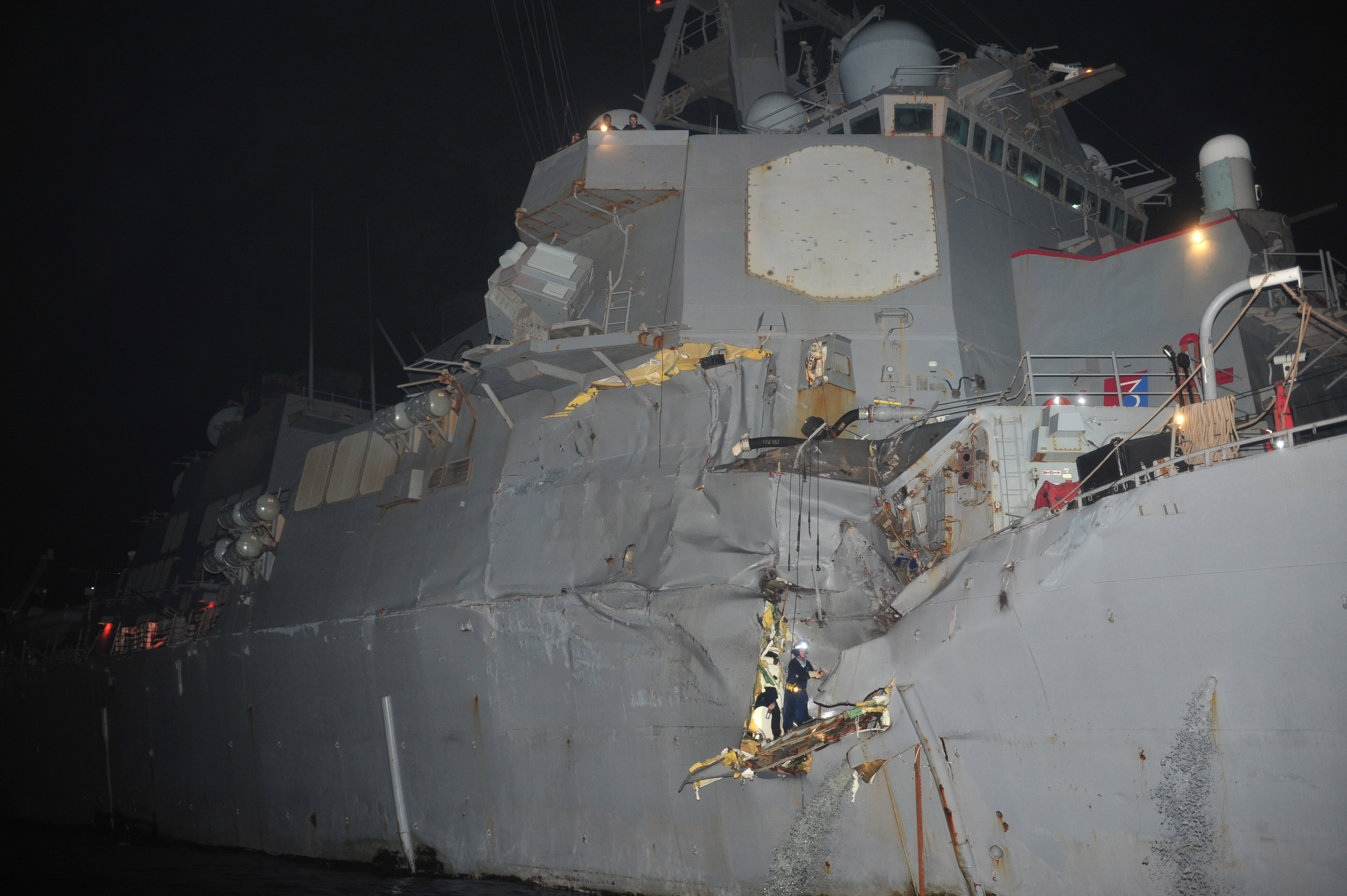
USS Porter after colliding with another ship in August 2012.

On 12 August 2012, Porter collided with MV Otowasan, an oil tanker, near the Strait of Hormuz. The collision ripped a 3-by-3-meter (10 ft × 10 ft) hole in the starboard side of the destroyer, forcing her to Jebel Ali, Dubai for repairs. No one on either ship was injured. Initially Naval Forces Central Command did not provide details about the collision, saying that it was under investigation. Porter's captain, Commander Martin Arriola, was subsequently removed from command of the ship and replaced by Commander Dave Richardson. On 12 October 2012, Porter rejoined Carrier Strike Group 12 for its transit through the Suez Canal following temporary repairs to the ship costing $700,000. Later repairs were budgeted at a cost of nearly $50 million.

=== Naval Station Rota ===
On 30 April 2015, Porter arrived at Naval Station Rota, Spain. Naval Station Rota would be Porter's permanent homeport for the next seven years. Porter joined three other US destroyers at Rota. These four ships were assigned to the United States Sixth Fleet, and conducted ballistic missile defense patrols in the Mediterranean Sea in support of Commander, US Sixth Fleet's mission.

=== 2016 upgrade ===
In 2016, four destroyers patrolling with the U.S. 6th Fleet based in Naval Station Rota, Spain, including Porter received self-protection upgrades, replacing the aft Phalanx CIWS 20mm Vulcan cannon with the SeaRAM 11-cell RIM-116 Rolling Airframe Missile launcher. The SeaRam uses the same sensor dome as the Phalanx. This was the first time the close-range ship defense system was paired with an Aegis ship. All four ships to receive the upgrade were either Flight I or II, meaning they originally had two Phalanx CIWS systems when launched.

=== Attack on Shayrat Airfield ===
On 7 April 2017, a total of 59 Tomahawk missiles were fired by Porter and Ross at military targets at Shayrat Airbase in Homs, Syria, from their positions in the eastern Mediterranean. The missile strike was in response to the Khan Shaykhun chemical attack on 4 April 2017, which the U.S. government said was launched by the Syrian regime from Shayrat.

=== Defender Europe 2021 ===
On 21 February 2021, Porter conducted an exercise with the Greek Navy's HS Adrias with four F-16s off southern Crete.

=== 2022 Baltic exercise ===
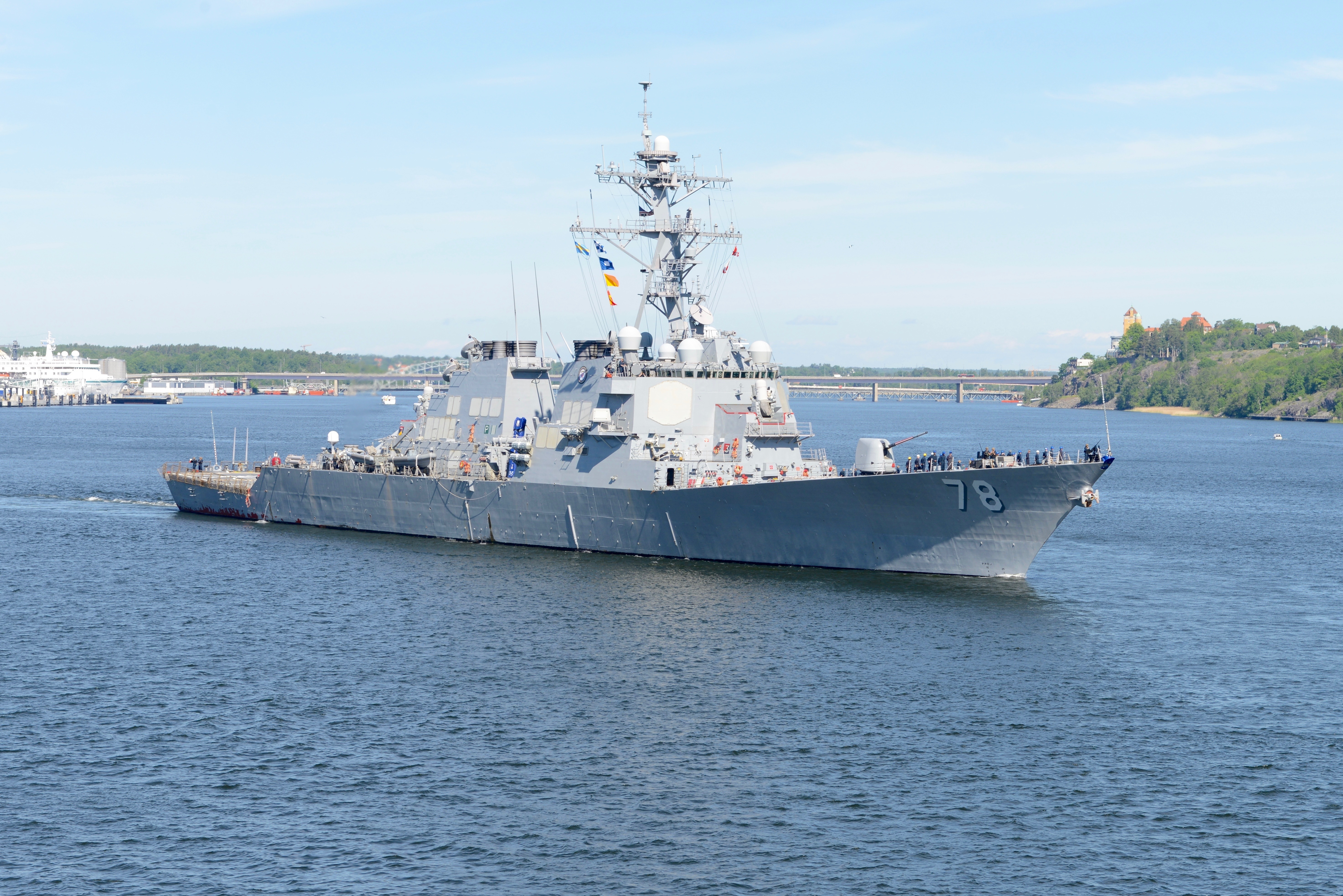
USS Porter during BALTOPS 2022.

In June 2022, Porter took part in the naval exercise BALTOPS 2022 in the Baltic Sea, where together with British destroyer HMS Defender and German frigate Sachsen, she provided an air defense screen for the task group centered around USS Kearsarge (LHD-3) and USS Gunston Hall (LSD-44).

=== Homeport Shift to Norfolk ===
On 28 September 2022, Porter departed Naval Station Rota for the last time as part of a homeport shift of the Rota-based destroyers. In October 2022, the Navy announced that Porter arrived at Norfolk after 7 years serving as a Forward-Deployed Naval Forces-Europe (FDNF-E) destroyer. USS Bulkeley replaced Porter at Rota.

== Awards ==
- Battle "E" – 2003
- Navy Unit Commendation (NUC) - 2003
- Battle "E" – 2016
- CNO Afloat Safety Award (LANTFLT) – (2008)
- LANTFLT Anti-Submarine Warfare (ASW) Bloodhound Award – 2016
- Captain Edward F. Ney Memorial Award for outstanding food service – 2020

== Coat of arms ==
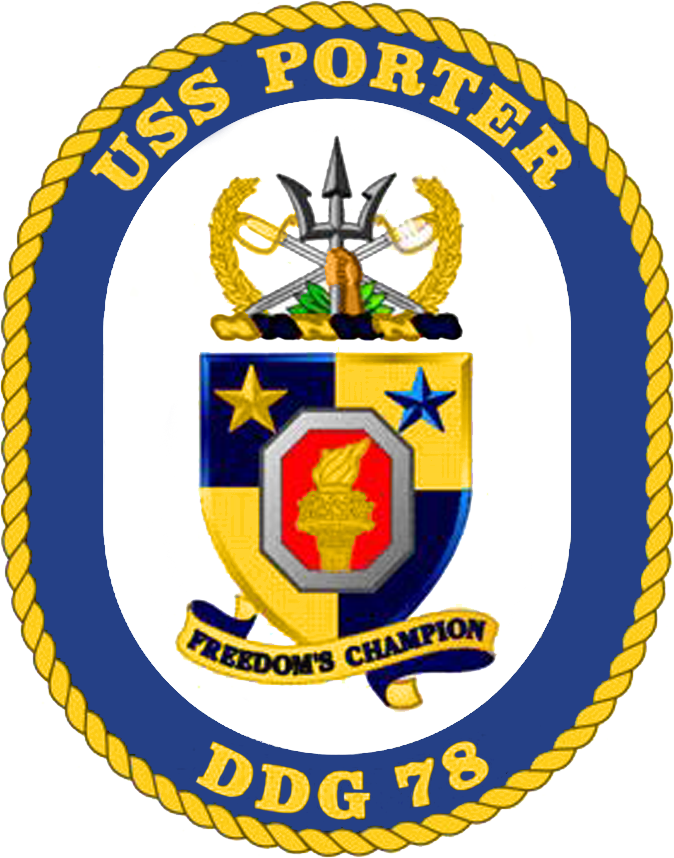

=== Shield ===
The shield has a quartered background of gold and a blue with a star in each upper quadrant. In the center of the shield is a red array enclosing a torch.

The traditional Navy colors were chosen for the shield because dark blue and gold represents the sea and excellence respectively. Red is emblematic of courage and sacrifice. The shield's quartered division recalling previous Porter's while underlining the US Navy's worldwide mission and the four cardinal compass points. The stars represent each battle star earned by the fourth Porter during World War II and the Korean War. The AEGIS array is red to reflect courage and action and symbolizes her modern warfare capabilities. The Statue of Liberty torch represents the ship's motto and signifies freedom, the principle of which our country was founded.

=== Crest ===
The crest consists of crossed swords behind an arm held trident, all surrounded by laurels.

Two Naval Officers' crossed swords honor David Porter, his son, and the ships mission to "Train, Fight and Win." The laurel, arm and trident are adaptations of the US Naval Academy's coat of arms highlighting David Porter's tenure as the Academy Superintendent. The trident is the symbol of sea power which denotes the AEGIS vertical launch system. The three prongs of the trident represent the three wars the Porter served in; the War of 1812, the Mexican War, and the Civil War.

=== Motto ===
The motto is written on a scroll of gold that has a blue reverse side.

The ships motto is "Freedom's Champion". The motto is a reference to the principles upon which the United States of America was founded and the honorable feats of Admiral Porter.

=== Seal ===
The coat of arms in full color as in the blazon, upon a white background enclosed within a dark blue oval border edged on the outside with a gold rope and bearing the inscription "USS PORTER" at the top and "DDG 78" in the base all gold.
