= Destroyer Squadron 60 =

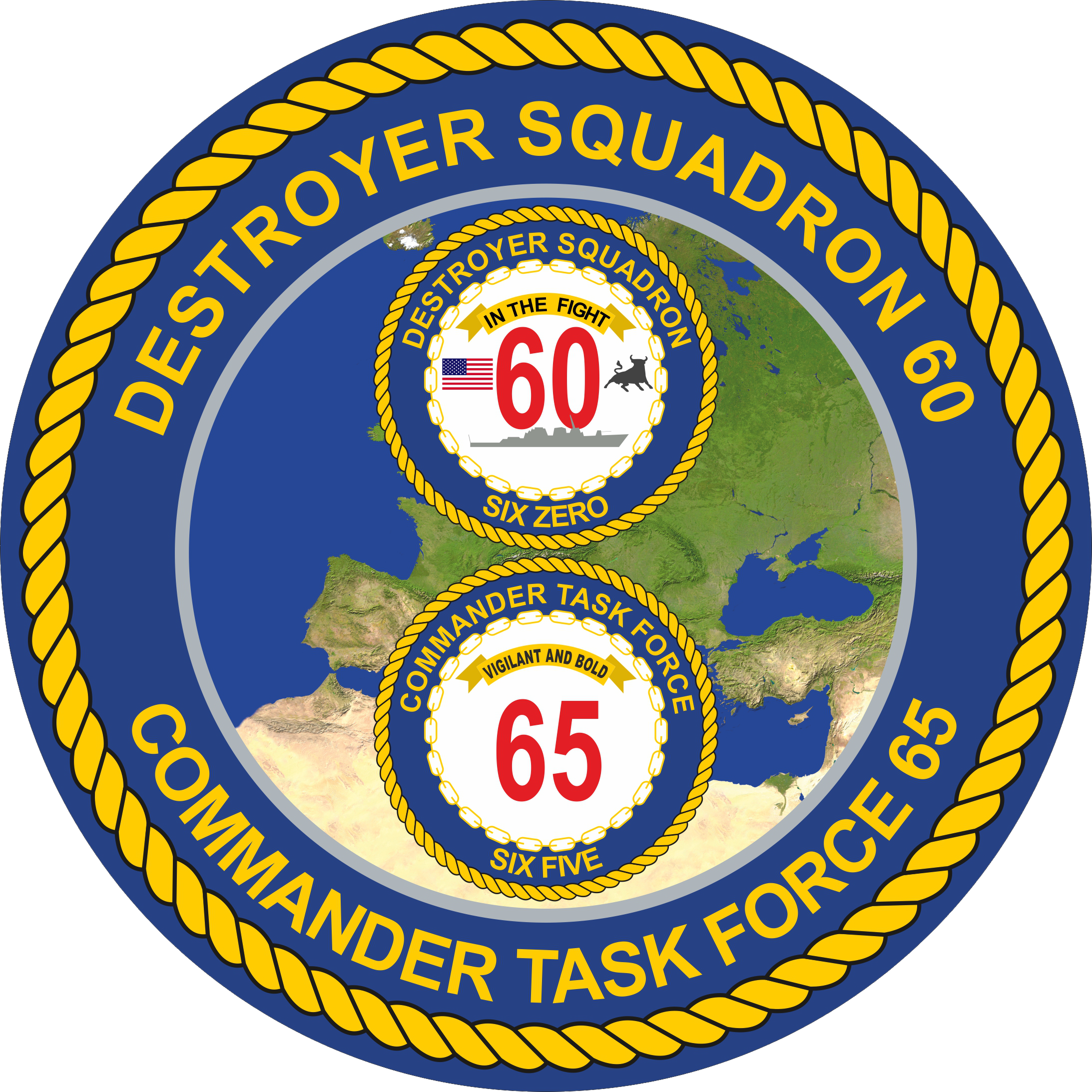
- Destroyer Squadron 60 emblem
- Active: 1940s, 19 February 2003 – present
- Country: United States
- Branch: United States Navy
- Type: Destroyer squadron
- Role: Naval surface/strike/anti-aircraft warfare, ballistic missile defense (BMD)
- Part of: United States Sixth Fleet
- Garrison/HQ: Naval Station Rota, Spain
- Motto: In the Fight
- Website: www.surflant.usff.navy.mil/desron60/

Commanders
- Commodore: Captain Alexander Mamikonian 16 April 2024-Present

Destroyer Squadron 60 (stylized DESRON 60, Destroyer Squadron SIX ZERO, and CDS 60) is a destroyer squadron of the United States Navy. Destroyer Squadron 60 is one of three U.S. Navy destroyer squadrons permanently based outside the continental United States.

== World War II ==
During World War II, Destroyer Squadron 60 consisted two destroyer divisions, the 119th and 120th, under the overall command of Captain William L. Freseman.

Destroyer Squadron 60, World War Two

Destroyer Division 119	Destroyer Division 120
USS Meredith (DD-726)	USS Cooper (DD-695)
USS O'Brien (DD-725)	USS Ingraham (DD-694)
USS Laffey (DD-724)	USS Moale (DD-693)
USS Walke (DD-723)	USS Allen M. Sumner (DD-692)
USS Barton (DD-722), flag	——

Destroyer Squadron 60 was part of the naval force assigned to Omaha Beach during the Normandy invasion of June 1944. On 6 June 1944, the Meredith struck a mine, and after being towed to the Bay of the Seine, sank on 9 June 1944. DESRON 60 subsequently was part of Task Force 129 which carried out the shore bombardment of the French seaport Cherbourg.

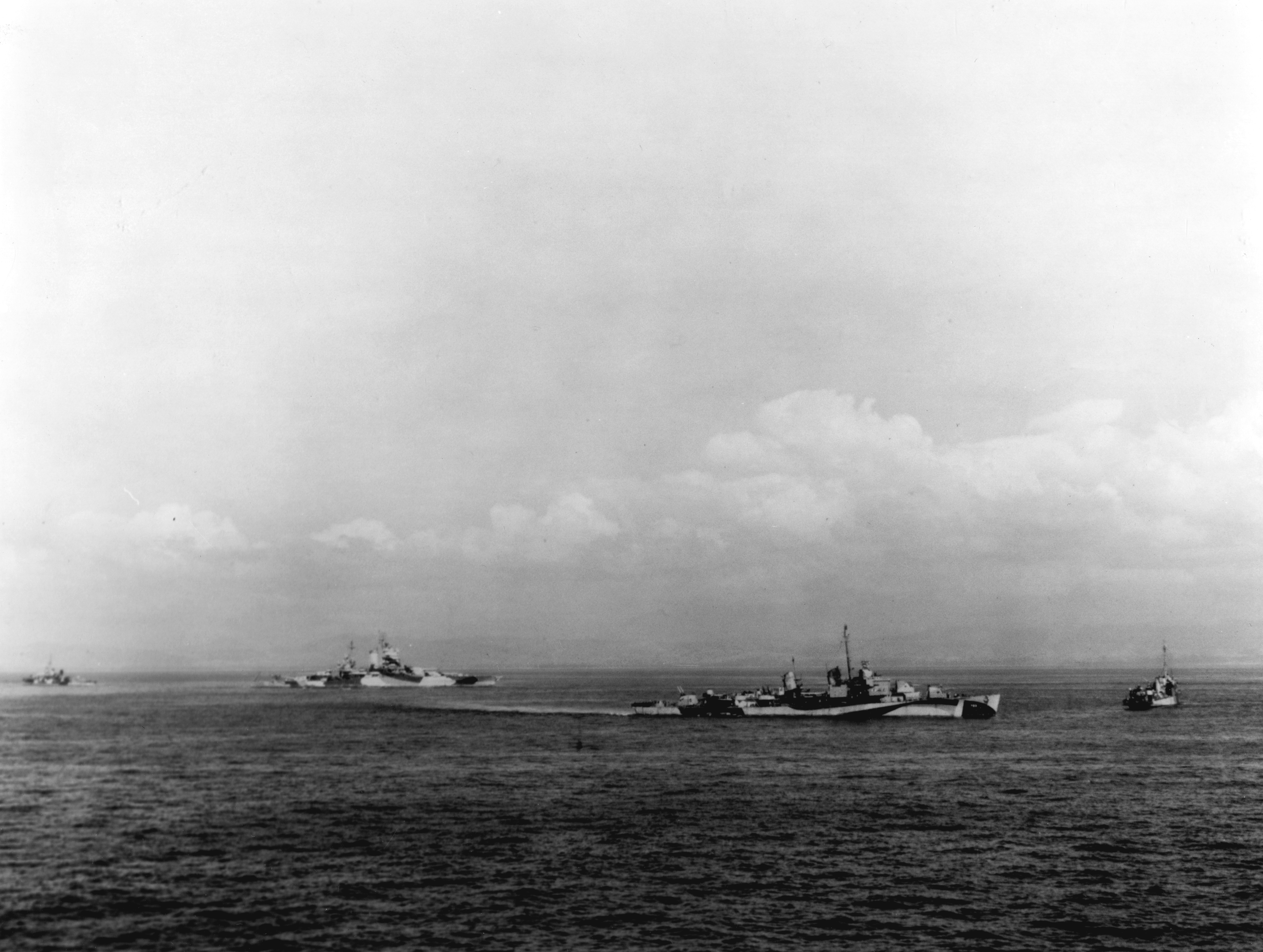
Lingayen Gulf (9 January 1945)

During the Pacific War, Destroyer Squadron 60 initially participated in the Philippines campaign. The squadron was part of the escort screen for Task Group 78.3, the amphibious assault force that invaded Leyte in October 1944. The squadron also participated in the ensuing Battle of Ormoc Bay. On 3 December 1944, during an attack on a Japanese convoy, the Cooper was torpedoed and sunk. Destroyer Squadron 60 subsequently operated as part of the destroyer screen for Task Group 77.2, the Bombardment and Fire Support Group for the January 1945 Invasion of Lingayen Gulf (pictured).

Destroyer Squadron 60 next operated with Task Force 38, the U.S. Third Fleet's Fast Carrier Task Force. On 16–17 February 1945, TF-38 flew air strikes against the Japanese home islands, Bonin Islands, and Volcano Islands to prevent any reinforcements of the Japanese garrison on Iwo Jima. During this period, Barton and Ingraham collided, and Moale was detached to escort the two damaged destroyers back to Saipan for repairs.

Destroyer Squadron 60 then operated off Okinawa during Operation Iceberg, with Destroyer Division 120 serving as the escort screen for Task Group 52.1, the escort carrier group providing carrier-based close air support to the Allied invasion force. Three units of Destroyer Squadron 60 – Walke, Barton, and Allen M. Sumner – came under intense kamikaze attacks during the squadron's operations in the closing months of the Pacific War.

== Re-establishment 2003 ==
On 19 February 2003, Destroyer Squadron 60 was re-established as a permanently assigned, forward-based destroyer squadron staff. It was initially based in Gaeta, Italy, the headquarters of the United States Sixth Fleet. At that time, the squadron's mission was described as to provide the Commander United States Sixth Fleet with a permanently assigned, forward-based destroyer squadron staff for the operational control over destroyers and frigates deployed to the Mediterranean Sea.

Destroyer Squadron 60, Present day

Destroyer Squadron 60
USS Roosevelt (DDG-80)
USS Arleigh Burke (DDG-51)
USS Bulkeley (DDG-84)
USS Paul Ignatius (DDG-117)
USS Oscar Austin (DDG-79)

With the courtesy title of commodore, the commander of Destroyer Squadron 60 (COMDESRON 60) not only oversees U.S. 6th Fleet surface naval warfare operations in the Mediterranean Sea but also throughout Europe and Africa. The squadron commodore also additionally serves as the executive assistant to the commander of U.S. Naval Forces Europe-Africa as well as the NATO commander of Allied Joint Force Command Naples for such exercises. In the latter NATO role, Commodore James Aiken (pictured) acted as the exercise director for Exercise Sea Breeze 2014, the annual multinational maritime exercise held in the Black Sea involving Standing NATO Maritime Group 2, NATO member navies, and navies involved in the Partnership for Peace initiative.

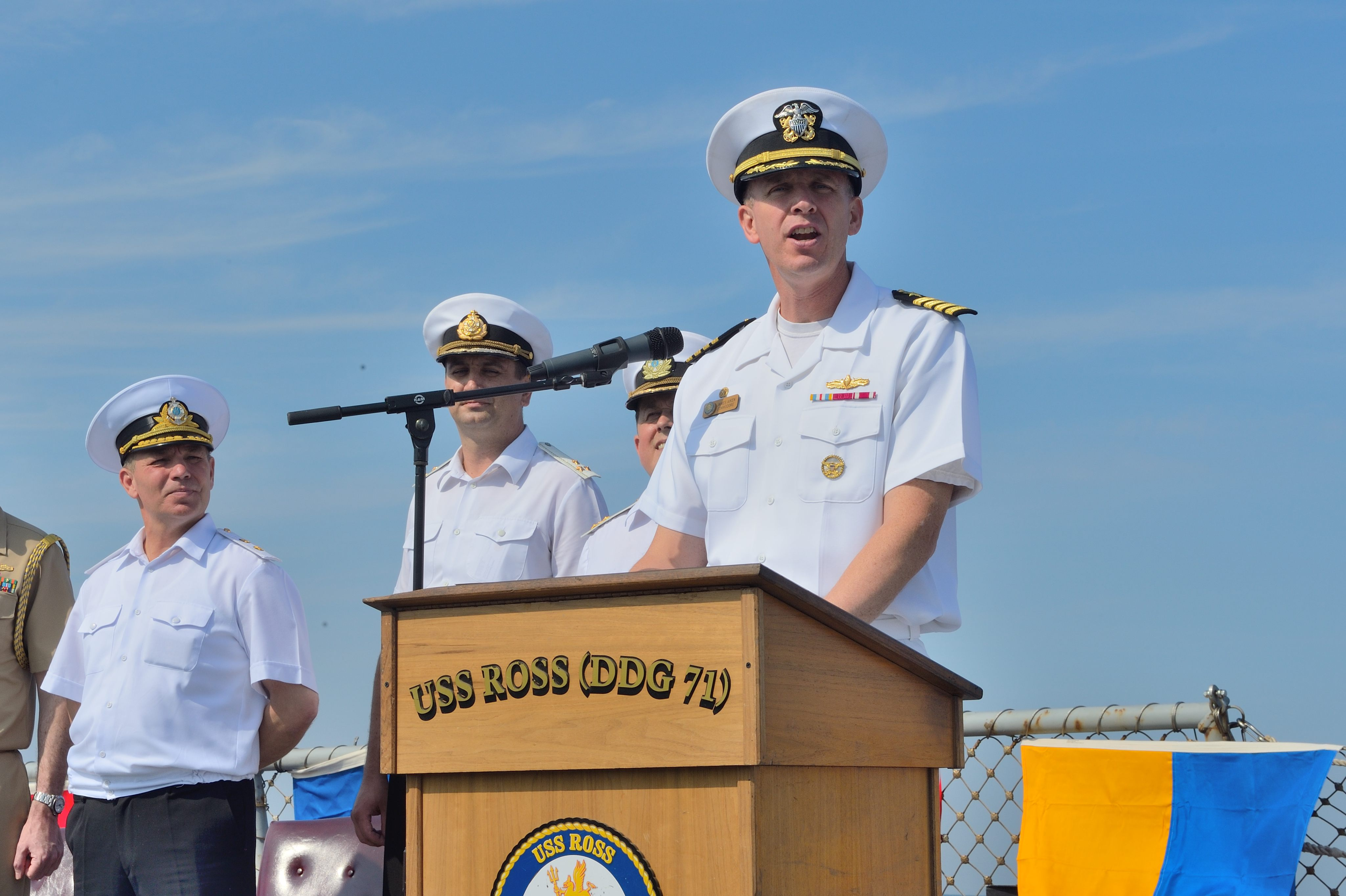
Commodore James Aiken, USN, COMDESRON 60 (8 September 2014)

Commander Destroyer Squadron 60 conducts combat and/or non-combat operations in his operational role as Commander Task Force 65 or as Sea Combat Commander, and when directed, as Maritime Interception Operations Commander. Depending on the missions to be undertaken, Task Force 65 employs surface warships, submarines, aircraft, SEAL teams, U.S. Marines, U.S. joint forces, and NATO forces assigned to the Sixth Fleet's area of operations to keep open the sea lines of communications throughout the U.S. European Command's area of responsibility.

2013 saw two major changes on the command responsibilities for the squadron:

- On 21 March 2013, the billet of Commander Destroyer Squadron 60 was renamed Commander Task Force 65, with Task Force 65 being the designation for the Sixth Fleet's surface combatant force.
- On 9 May 2013, Commander Destroyer Squadron 60 (COMDESRON 60) was formally re-established to provide type-command administrative oversight for those four BMD-capable destroyers assigned to the squadron.

In this new "type" capacity, COMDESRON 60 supervises the training, readiness, maintenance, schedules, material, supply, discipline, and morale for those assigned BMD-capable destroyers. Commander Destroyer Squadron 60 continues to command Task Force 65 in a "dual-hatted" role from two locations. The staff of Destroyer Squadron 60 is located in Rota, Spain and the staff of Task Force 65 is located in Naples, Italy. .

=== Africa Partnership Station ===
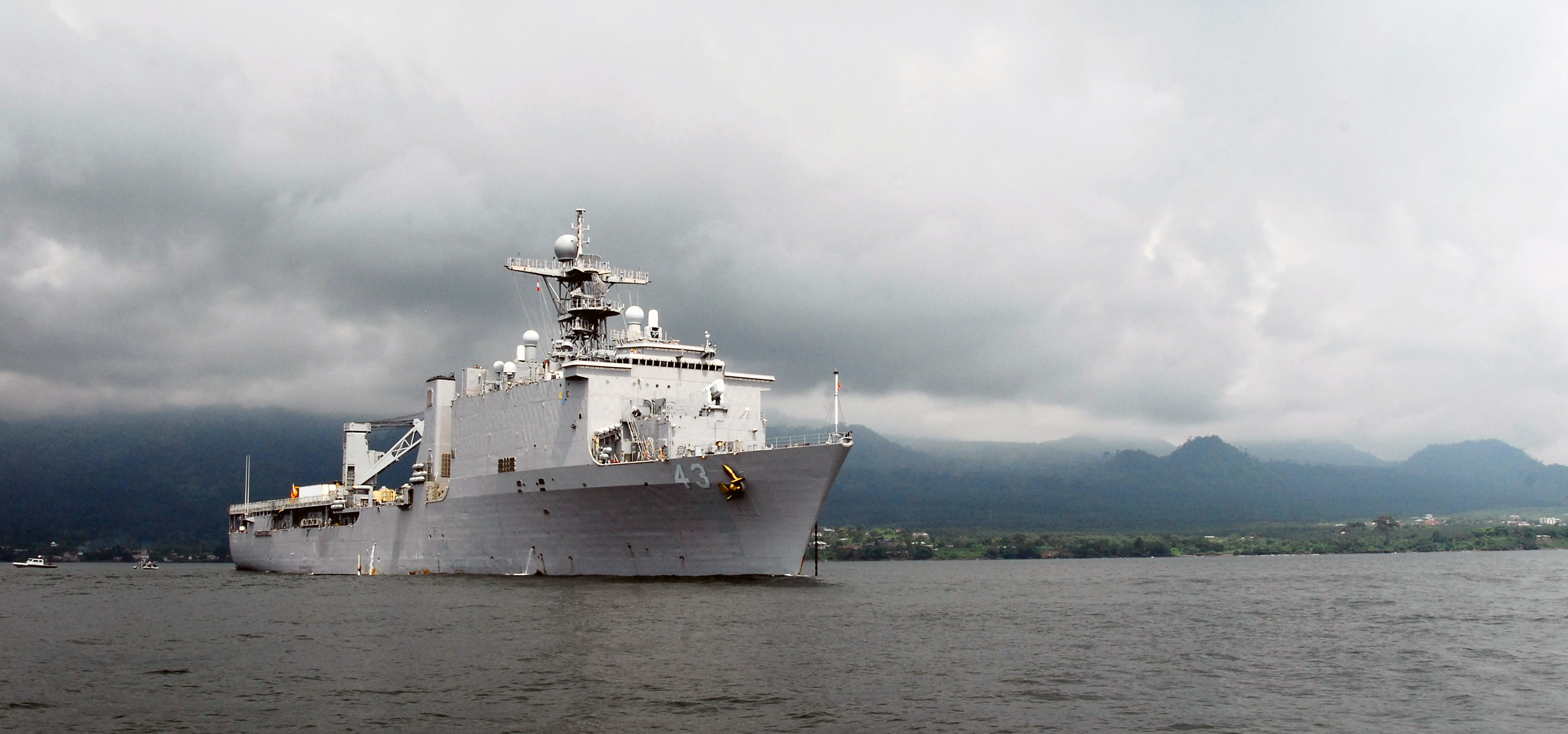
USS Fort McHenry – APS 2007

On 29 October 2007, the first Africa Partnership Station (APS) began under the command of Captain John Nowell, who was serving as Commander Destroyer Squadron 60 at the time. The APS task group, CTF-365, departed from Naples, Italy, with the dock landing ship USS Fort McHenry (LSD-43) (pictured) serving as its flagship and accompanied by the high-speed support ship USS Swift (HSV-2). En route to the region, the Fort McHenry augmented its passenger list with specialists from France, Germany, the United Kingdom and Spain and officers from Nigeria, Cameroon and Ghana. Denmark, Italy and Portugal were also provided military staff support. During its seven-month deployment, CTF-365 visited Senegal, Liberia, Ghana, Cameroon, Gabon, Angola, and Sao Tome and Principe. Africa Partnership Station 2007 developed cooperative partnerships among the regional maritime services while improving safety and security for the host nations. APS 2007 also supported over 20 humanitarian assistance projects during this deployment.

During her tour as Commander Destroyer Squadron 60, then-Captain Cynthia N. Thebaud commanded two multi-national African Partnership Station deployments that focused on maritime security capacity-building in West and Central Africa.

Commander John D. Tolg, commanded the 2009 USNS SWIFT Africa Partnership Station (APS) to West Central Africa, the deployment focused on maritime security capacity-building in West and Central Africa while embarking over 100 international sailors from 7 countries for Visit Board and Search (VBSS) operations. The SWIFT visited 10 West Central Africa countries engaging with Heads of State, Ambassadors and Senior Military representatives.

=== European Phased Adaptive Approach ===
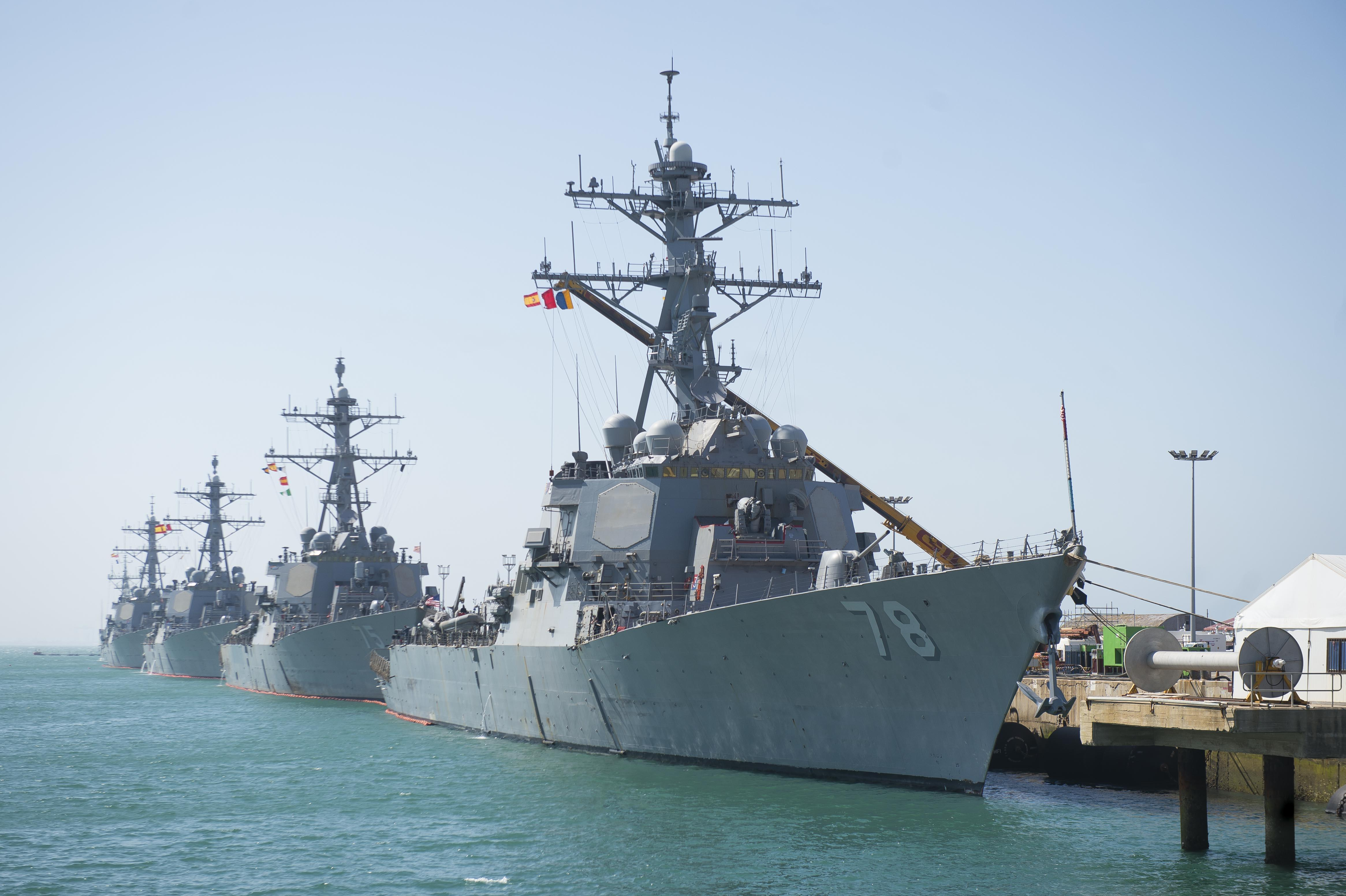
Porter (front) with (r-l) Donald Cook, Carney and Ross moored in Rota, Spain

On 5 October 2011, U.S. Secretary of Defense Leon Panetta announced that the United States Navy will station four Aegis Ballistic Missile Defense System warships at Naval Station Rota, Spain, to strengthen its presence in the Mediterranean Sea and bolster the ballistic missile defense (BMD) of NATO as part of the European Phased Adaptive Approach (EPAA) missile defense program. On 16 February 2012, it was reported that the Arleigh Burke-class destroyers Donald Cook and Ross (pictured) will be relocated to Rota during Fiscal Year 2014, followed by Porter and Carney (pictured) in fiscal year 2015. On 9 May 2013, Commander Destroyer Squadron 60 was formally designated to perform type-command administrative oversight for the four BMD-capable destroyers based at Rota, Spain.

On 31 January 2014, the first BDM-arm destroyer, the Donald Cook, departed Naval Station Norfolk, Virginia, for its new home-port of Rota, Spain. On 3 June 2014, the next BDM-arm destroyer, the Ross, departed Naval Station Norfolk, Virginia, for its new home-port of Rota, Spain, arriving on 16 June 2014. The third destroyer, the Porter, joined Destroyer Squadron 60 on 30 April 2015. The final destroyer, USS Carney, arrived at Rota, Spain, on 25 September 2016, completing the forward deployment of Destroyer Squadron 60 to the European Phased Adaptive Approach mission.

=== 2013 Ghouta chemical attack ===
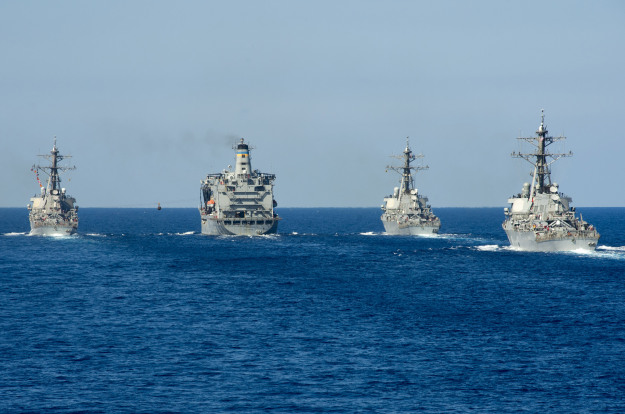
Ramage, Barry, and Stout conducting a replenishment-at-sea with Leroy Grumman (27 September 2013)

The U.S. Navy initially delayed the departure of the Aegis-equipped guided-missile destroyer Mahan from the U.S. Sixth Fleet amid allegations that the regime of Syrian president Bashar al-Assad used chemical weapons during the ongoing Syrian civil war, including the gas attacks that occurred on 21 August 2013. Both the Mahan and its relief, the Ramage, remained in the Eastern Mediterranean with two other Aegis-equipped destroyers, the Barry and Gravely. All four destroyers are capable of intercepting ballistic missiles as well as launching land-attack Tomahawk cruise missiles.

On 28 August 2013, the U.S. Navy announced that a fifth Arleigh Burke-class destroyer, the USS Stout (DDG-55), was en route to join the other four Burke-class destroyers in the Eastern Mediterranean. On 4 September 2013, the US Navy announced that USS Mahan had departed for its home-port of Naval Station Norfolk, Virginia, leaving four Burke-class destroyers operating in the Eastern Mediterranean. On 13 September 2013, the Mahan returned to Naval Station Norfolk, Virginia, completing an 8 1/2-month deployment with the U.S. Sixth Fleet.

On 12 September 2013, the U.S. Department of Defense announced that the remaining four Burke-class destroyers will remain in the eastern Mediterranean as Russian and American diplomats negotiate the turn-over of Syria's stockpile of chemical weapons to the United Nations, with Pentagon spokesman George E. Little noting: "We have no plans at this time to change our military posture in the Mediterranean. We’re prepared for any potential military contingencies that might involve Syria." On 31 October 2013, the Organisation for the Prohibition of Chemical Weapons announced that all declared equipment and facilities related to Syria's chemical weapons production have been destroyed.

=== 2014 Black Sea incident ===
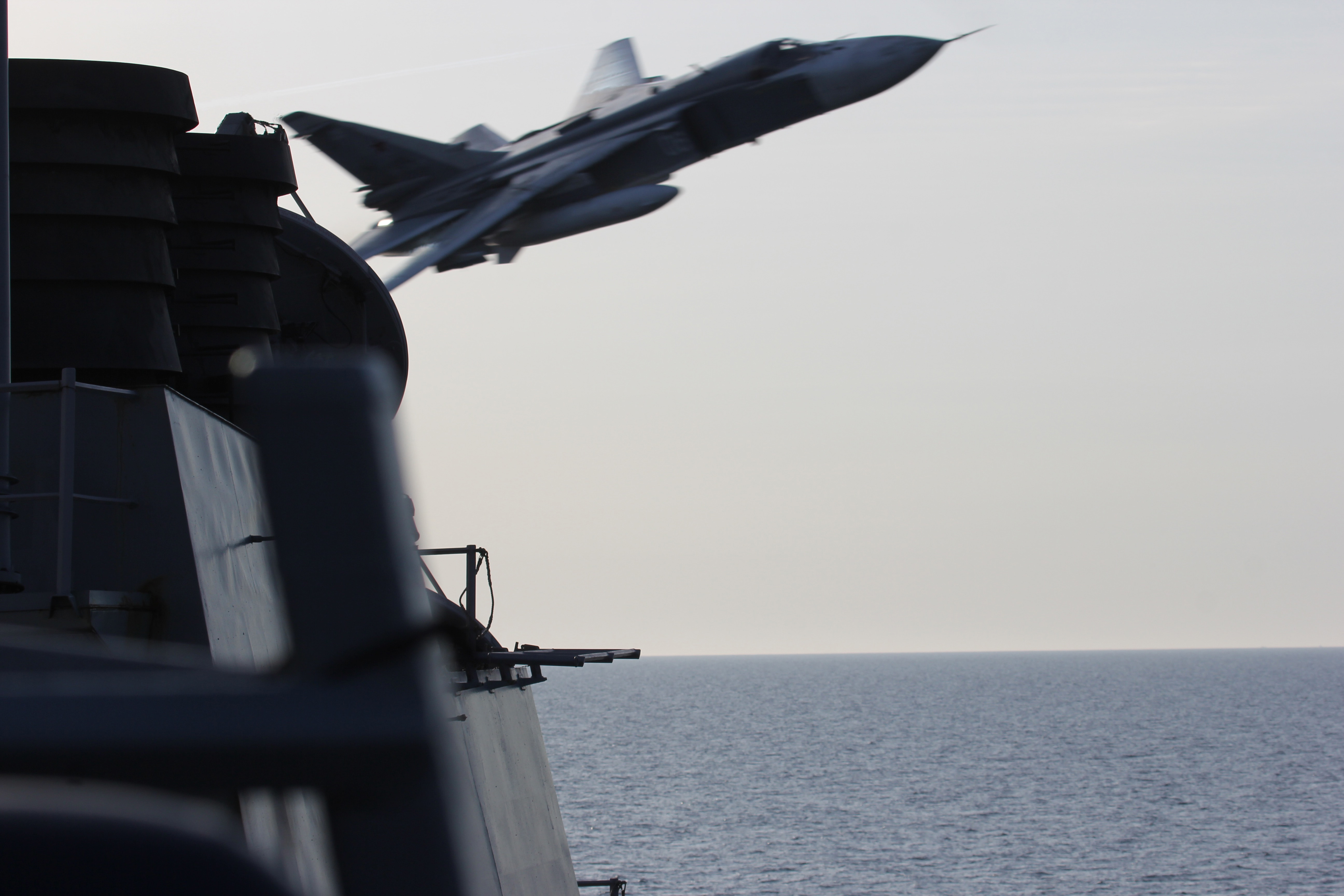
Flyover of Russian Sukhoi Su-24

On 14 March 2014, Desron-60 guided-missile destroyer USS Donald Cook (DDG-75) departed for its first patrol as a forward deployed naval vessel of the U.S. Sixth Fleet. On 10 April 2014, Donald Cook entered the Black Sea. A Department of Defense spokesman said the deployment of the Donald Cook to the Black Sea was "to reassure NATO allies and Black Sea partners of America’s commitment to strengthen and improve interoperability while working towards mutual goals in the region."

On 12 April 2014, the Donald Cook was operating in the western Black Sea when a pair of unarmed Russian Su-24 Fencer attack aircraft enter the area. One Su-24 left its formation and began to fly closer to the Donald Cook. A total of twelves passes took place over a 90-minute period, and the Russian aircraft approached within about 1,000 yards of the Donald Cook.

In the aftermath of this incident, Pentagon spokesman Colonel Warren stated: "This provocative and unprofessional Russian action is inconsistent with international protocols and previous agreements on the professional interaction between our militaries." On 14 April 2014, the Donald Cook paid a port call at Constanța, Romania, which included a visit by Romanian president Traian Băsescu. The Donald Cook conducted a multilateral training exercise with the Romanian warships Regina Maria and Mărășești, as well as the frigate Taylor.

The Donald Cook departed the Black Sea on 24 April 2014. After a port visit to Durrës, Albania, and training with Albanian forces, the Donald Cook returned to Rota, Spain, on 25 July 2014, completing its first forward-based deployment. Donald Cook's next Black Sea cruise, 28 December 2014 to 14 January 2015, transpired without incident.

=== 2015 Black Sea incident ===
On 21 May 2015, the destroyer USS Ross (DDG-71) entered the Black Sea to conduct joint operations with NATO and regional navies as part of Operation Atlantic Resolve. On 25 May 2015, the Ross began a 3-day training exercise with the frigates Regina Maria and Mărășești of the Romanian Navy.

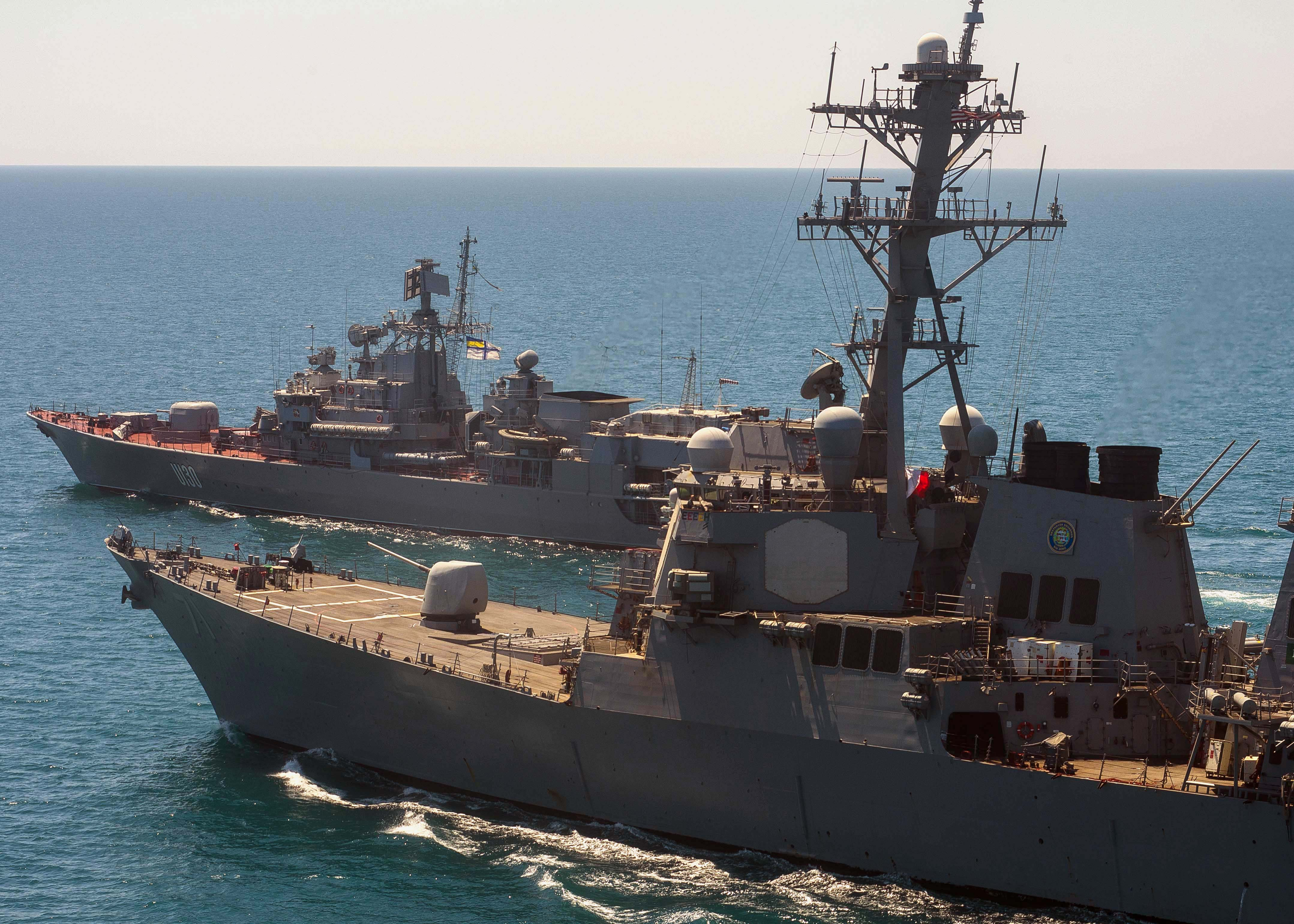
Ross, front, with Hetman Sahaydachniy in the Black Sea (1 June 2015)

On 30 May 2015, the Ross was over-flown by Russian Su-24 Fencer aircraft while the ship was underway in the Black Sea. In its 31 May 2015 press release, the U.S. Navy noted that:

Ross observed the routine flights of SU-24 aircraft and had no interaction while both operated in international waters. Ross continued on her mission after observing the aircraft return to base. At no time did Ross act aggressively nor did she deviate from her planned operations. The conduct of her crew has been and continues to be professional.

On 1 June 2015, U.S. Defense Department spokesman Colonel Steven Warren, U.S. Army, further noted that the Russian military aircraft in the incident "were naked. In other words, no weapons aboard, no weapons on her wings." Also on that date, the U.S. Navy released a video of the Russian aircraft overflight. Finally, on this date, the Ross began a two-day naval exercise with the Ukrainian frigate Hetman Sahaydachniy (pictured). On 3 June 2015, the Ross departed the Black Sea, concluding an 11-day cruise.

=== 2015 NATO Exercise Sea Breeze ===
The squadron's destroyer Porter entered the Black Sea on 5 July 2015 to join Dutch frigate Tromp, the Portuguese frigate D. Francisco de Almeida, and Spanish minesweeper Tajo for the NATO Exercise Sea Breeze 2015. The exercise was planned to include 30 ships and around 1,700 personnel from Greece, Bulgaria, Turkey, the Netherlands, Spain, and the United States, as well as NATO's Standing NATO Maritime Group 1 and Standing NATO Mine Countermeasures Group 2. Sea Breeze 2015 was scheduled to take place between 3–12 July 2015.

=== 2017 Attack on Shayrat Airfield ===
On 7 April 2017, USS Ross (DDG-71) and USS Porter (DDG-78), from their positions in the Eastern Mediterranean Sea, fired a total of 59 Tomahawk cruise missiles at specific military targets at the Shayrat airfield in Syria. The missile barrage was in response to the death of at least 80 civilians in the immediate aftermath of 4 April 2017, Khan Shaykhun chemical attack in Idlib province, an attack that the US government concluded was launched by the Syrian regime, from Shayrat.

=== 2018 Black Sea Operations ===
On 16 February 2018, USS Ross (DDG-71) joined USS Carney (DDG-64) in the Black Sea near Russia for an "unspecified regional proactive presence mission". The move follows increased tensions between Russia and the U.S. after American federal prosecutors announced indictments against 13 Russian citizens for their alleged interference in the 2016 U.S. presidential campaign. The destroyers also arrived in the Black Sea during the fourth anniversary of the 2014 Winter Olympics at Sochi, Russia. Speculation that successful hosting of the 2014 Winter Olympic games provided President Vladimir Putin with the nationalist support he needed to proceed with the forced annexation of Crimea from Ukraine in 2014.

=== 2020 Barents Sea Operations ===
In late April 2020, the destroyers USS Donald Cook (DDG-75), USS Porter (DDG-78) and USS Roosevelt (DDG-80) operated with the fast combat support ship USNS Supply (T-AOE-6), a U.S. nuclear-powered submarine, and a P-8A maritime patrol aircraft above the Arctic Circle after completing training together as part of the Submarine Command Course (SMCC) sponsored the Royal Navy. In May 2020, the three U.S. destroyers and the Supply operated in the Barents Sea with the British frigate HMS Kent (F78) to "assert freedom of navigation and demonstrate seamless integration among allies", the first such operation in this area since the 1980s.

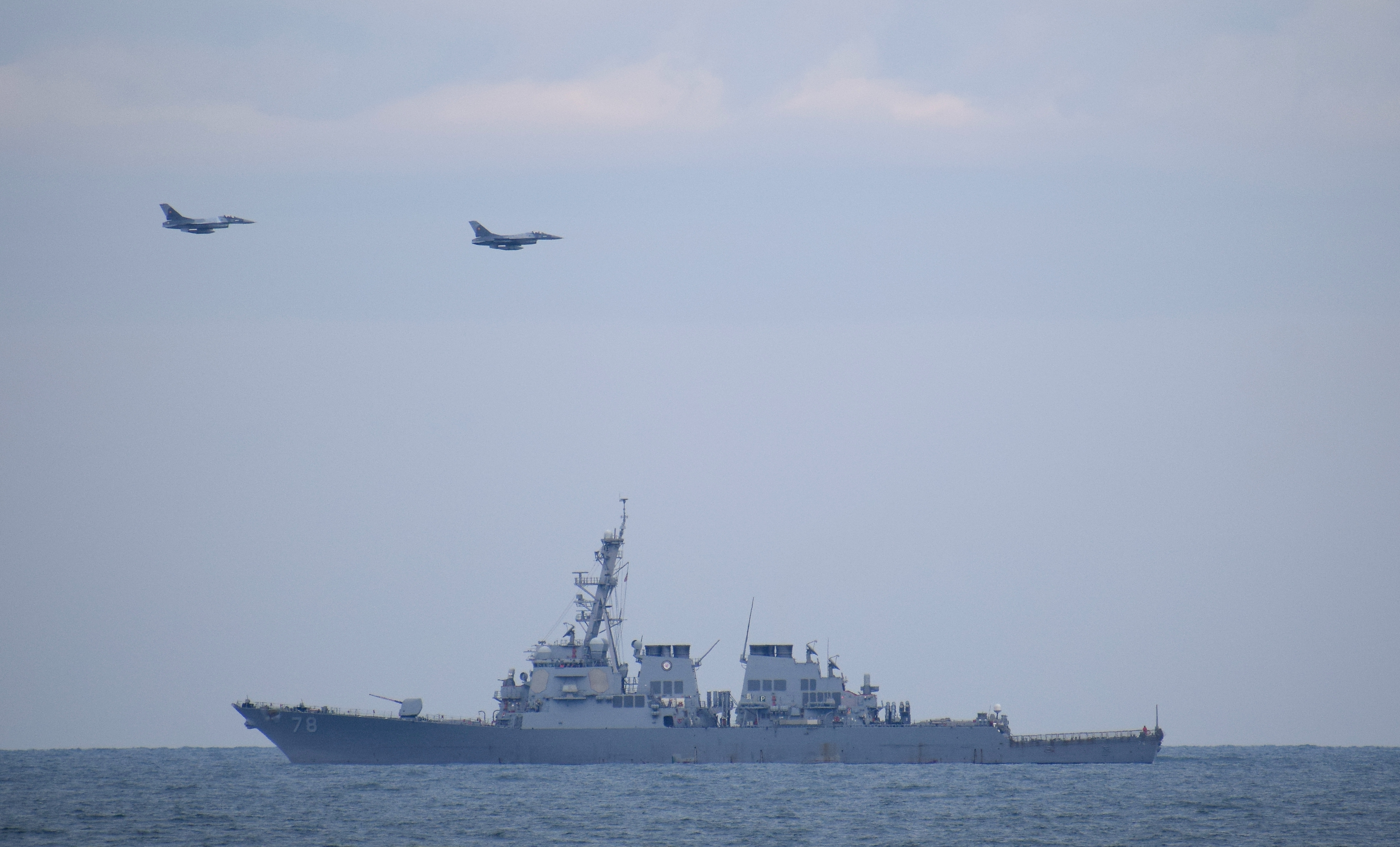
USS Porter overflown by two Romanian F-16 fighters in February 2021

=== 2021 Black Sea Operations ===
In February 2021, USS Porter (DDG-78) and USNS Laramie (T-AO-203) took part in maneuvering exercises with the Romanian frigate Mărășești and Romanian Air Force F-16 fighters in the Black Sea.

USS Porter (DDG-78) returned to the Black Sea in late 2021, and visited the port of Batumi in Georgia after participating in the United States Air Forces in Europe – Air Forces Africa led Operation Castle Forge together with USS Mount Whitney (LCC-20). The two ships also participated in bilateral exercises with ships from the Bulgarian Navy and Turkish Navy as well as the Georgian Coast Guard. Previously, USS Donald Cook (DDG-75) also visited Batumi in February 2021.

== List of commanders ==
No.	Commodores		Term		
No.	Portrait	Name	Took office	Left office	Term length
1	W.L. Freseman	Captain; W.L. Freseman	1 March 1944	2 April 1945	1 year, 32 days
2	Beverly Harrison	Captain; Beverly Harrison	2 April 1945	7 January 1946	280 days
3	Rolor Taylor	Captain; Rolor Taylor	19 February 2003	15 April 2005	2 years, 55 days
4	Thomas Rowden	Captain; Thomas Rowden	15 April 2005	12 August 2006	1 year, 119 days
5	John Nowell	Captain; John Nowell	12 August 2006	1 August 2008	1 year, 355 days
6	Cynthia Thebaud	Captain; Cynthia Thebaud	1 August 2008	18 August 2010	2 years, 17 days
7	Dan Shaffer	Captain; Dan Shaffer	18 August 2010	3 August 2012	1 year, 351 days
8	John M. Esposito	Captain; John M. Esposito	3 August 2012	13 December 2013	1 year, 132 days
9	James Aiken	Captain; James Aiken	13 December 2013	3 August 2015	1 year, 233 days
10	Richard Dromerhauser	Captain; Richard Dromerhauser	3 August 2015	9 December 2016	1 year, 128 days
11	Tate Westbrook	Captain; Tate Westbrook	9 December 2016	29 March 2018	1 year, 110 days
12	Matthew Lehman	Captain; Matthew Lehman	29 March 2018	9 August 2019	1 year, 133 days
12	Joseph Gagliano	Captain; Joseph Gagliano	9 August 2019	10 August 2021	2 years, 1 day
12	Kyle Gantt	Captain; Kyle Gantt	10 August 2021	5 August 2022	360 days
12	Edward Sundberg	Captain; Edward Sundberg	5 August 2022	17 April 2024	1 year, 256 days
13	Alexander Mamikonian	Captain; Alexander Mamikonian	17 April 2024	10 Sep 2025	1 year, 146 days
14	Kelechi Ndukwe	Captain; Kelechi Ndukwe	10 Sep 2025	Incumbent	364 days

== See also ==
- 1986 Black Sea incident
- 1988 Black Sea bumping incident
- Aegis Ashore
- Montreux Convention Regarding the Regime of the Straits
- U.S.–Soviet Incidents at Sea agreement
