= Japanese destroyer Take (1944) =

Destroyer of the Imperial Japanese Navy

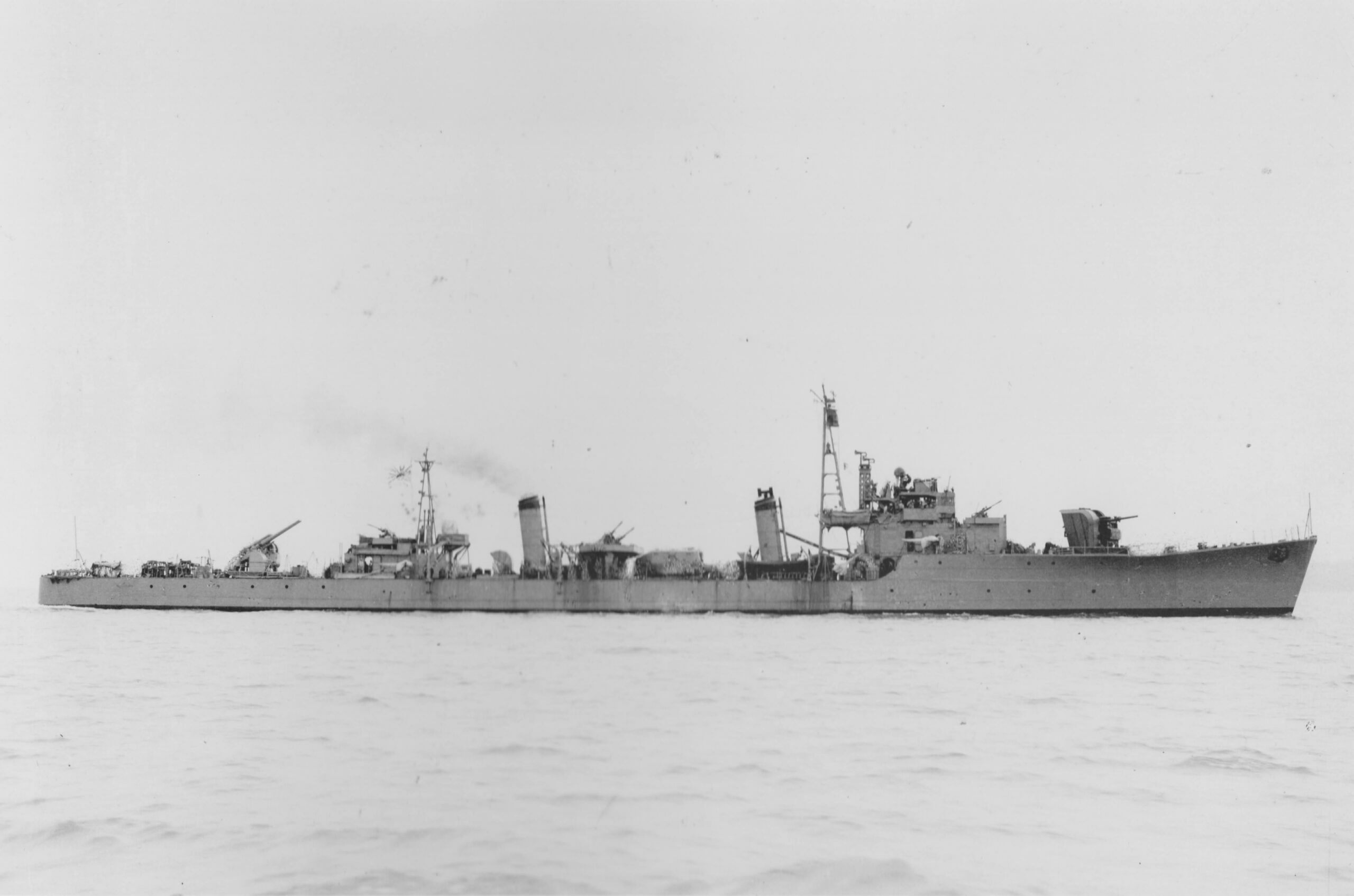
- Take, 30 May 1944

History

Empire of Japan
- Name: Take
- Namesake: Bamboo
- Builder: Yokosuka Naval Arsenal
- Laid down: 25 October 1943
- Launched: 28 March 1944
- Completed: 16 June 1944
- Stricken: 5 October 1945
- Fate: Turned over to Great Britain, 16 July 1947, Scrapped, 1948

General characteristics (as built)
- Class & type: Matsu-class escort destroyer
- Displacement: 1,282 t (1,262 long tons) (standard)
- Length: 100 m (328 ft 1 in) (o/a)
- Beam: 9.35 m (30 ft 8 in)
- Draft: 3.3 m (10 ft 10 in)
- Installed power: 2 × water-tube boilers; 19,000 shp (14,000 kW)
- Propulsion: 2 shafts, 2 × geared steam turbines
- Speed: 27.8 knots (51.5 km/h; 32.0 mph)
- Range: 4,680 nmi (8,670 km; 5,390 mi) at 16 knots (30 km/h; 18 mph)
- Complement: 210
- Sensors & processing systems: 1 × Type 22 search radar; 1 × Type 13 early-warning radar
- Armament: 1 × twin, 1 × single 127 mm (5 in) DP guns; 4 × triple, 8 × single 25 mm (1 in) AA guns; 1 × quadruple 610 mm (24 in) torpedo tubes; 2 × rails, 2 × throwers for 36 depth charges

Take (竹; "Bamboo") was one of 18 Matsu-class escort destroyers built for the Imperial Japanese Navy (IJN) near the end of World War II. Completed in mid-1944, the ship spent her short career escorting troop and supply convoys. She was damaged in the Battle of Ormoc Bay in early December and returned to Japan for repairs. Remaining in home waters for the rest of the war, she was modified to deliver Kaiten manned torpedoes in early 1945. Take was surrendered to the Allies at the end of the war and used to repatriate Japanese troops until 1947. Mid-year the destroyer was turned over to the United Kingdom and later scrapped.

== Design and description ==
Designed for ease of production, the Matsu class was smaller, slower and more lightly armed than previous destroyers as the IJN intended them for second-line duties like escorting convoys, releasing the larger ships for missions with the fleet. The ships measured 100 meters (328 ft 1 in) long overall, with a beam of 9.35 meters (30 ft 8 in) and a draft of 3.3 meters (10 ft 10 in). Their crew numbered 210 officers and enlisted men. They displaced 1,282 metric tons (1,262 long tons) at standard load and 1,554 metric tons (1,529 long tons) at deep load. The ships had two Kampon geared steam turbines, each driving one propeller shaft, using steam provided by two Kampon water-tube boilers. The turbines were rated at a total of 19,000 shaft horsepower (14,000 kW) for a speed of 27.8 knots (51.5 km/h; 32.0 mph). The Matsus had a range of 4,680 nautical miles (8,670 km; 5,390 mi) at 16 knots (30 km/h; 18 mph).

The main armament of the Matsu-class ships consisted of three 127-millimeter (5 in) Type 89 dual-purpose guns in one twin-gun mount aft and one single mount forward of the superstructure. The single mount was partially protected against spray by a gun shield. The accuracy of the Type 89 guns was severely reduced against aircraft because no high-angle gunnery director was fitted. The ships carried a total of 20 Type 96 25-millimeter (1 in) anti-aircraft guns in four triple and eight single mounts. The Matsus were equipped with a Type 22 surface-search radar. The ships were also armed with a single rotating quadruple mount amidships for 610-millimeter (24 in) torpedoes. They could deliver their 36 depth charges via two stern rails and two throwers.

Take probably was not initially fitted with a Type 13 early-warning radar. The radar and five additional 25 mm guns on single mounts were probably installed in late 1944.

== Construction and career ==
Authorized in the late 1942 Modified 5th Naval Armaments Supplement Program, Take (bamboo) was laid down by the Yokosuka Naval Arsenal on 25 October 1943 and launched on 28 March 1944. Completed on 16 June 1944, the ship was assigned to Destroyer Squadron 11 of the Combined Fleet for a month's training. The ship was assigned to the newly formed Destroyer Division 43 of the squadron on 15 July. That same day she escorted a convoy to the Ryukyu Islands, resuming training upon her return to home waters on 20 July.

Take and the rest of the division were transferred to the 31st Escort Squadron of the 5th Fleet on 20 August. At that time, the ship was conducting an unsuccessful search for survivors of the sunken light cruiser Natori near Palau. Six days later she attempted to render assistance to the destroyer Samidare which had run aground on Velasco Reef near Palau, but Samidare had been torpedoed by the American submarine USS Batfish the day prior and broken in half. Take rescued the survivors and ferried them to Palau. The ship escorted a convoy from Manila, Philippines, to Miri, Borneo, from 4 to 14 October and probably returned directly to Manila. Six days later she was part of the escort for Convoy MATA 30 (also known as the Harukaze Convoy) between Manila and Takao, Japanese Taiwan, between 20 and 26 October. During the voyage, Take helped the destroyer Harukaze sink the submarine USS Shark on 24 October and rescued 347 survivors from the torpedoed merchantman Airsan Maru. Take arrived back at Manila on 30 October.

Convoys TA-3 and TA-4 were tasked to transport the 26th Division to Ormoc Bay to reinforce Japanese forces on the island of Leyte, Philippines, after the recent American amphibious landing there. TA-3 would carry the division's heavy equipment while TA-4 would ferry the unit's troops. American airstrikes and typhoon weather caused delays in loading the ships of TA-3, but the TA-4 troop ships were able to depart as scheduled on 8 November with TA-3 leaving a day later with Take assigned to her escort. TA-4 was attacked by American carrier aircraft after it had unloaded most of its troops earlier on 10 November and had lost several ships sunk and others damaged. TA-3 encountered the withdrawing TA-4 in the early evening and the commanders agreed to exchange escorts. Take and the destroyer Hatsuharu were tasked with escorting the damaged destroyer Akishimo and the cargo ship Kinka Maru to Manila. They reached the port the next day with Take continuing onward with Akishimo to Cavite Navy Yard.

The carriers of Task Force 38 conducted airstrikes on ships in Manila Harbor beginning on 13 November, but Take was not damaged. Together with four other destroyers, she withdrew to the Spratly Islands that night. The group was ordered to proceed to occupied Brunei, but Take was detached and ordered to return to Manila to escort more reinforcements for Ormoc Bay. The destroyer was tasked with leading three fast transports as the second echelon of Convoy TA-5. They departed on 24 November and anchored overnight in the Balanacan. The convoy was attacked the following morning by aircraft from the carrier USS Intrepid (CV-11). Two of the transports were sunk while the third one was badly damaged. Take was not hit, but was damaged by near-misses that killed 15 crewmen. Bomb splinters caused leaks in her oil tanks and damaged her gyrocompass and half her radios. The ship's captain decided to return to Manila after rescuing survivors and they arrived there on 27 November. Take began repairs at Cavite Navy Yard later that day.

With the ship's repairs completed on 29 November, Take and her sister ship Kuwa were ordered to escort the third echelon of Convoy TA-7 from Manila to Ormoc Bay. The ships departed on 1 December and arrived on the evening of 2 December; Kuwa took up a patrol position seaward of the unloading convoy, while Take loaded survivors from a previous convoy. The convoy had been spotted enroute by American aircraft and three destroyers had been ordered to intercept them. Their radar spotted the Japanese ships at a range of 20,000 yards (18,000 m) at 23:55 and the Americans opened fire at 00:08; Take was engaged by USS Moale at a range of 7,500 yards (6,900 m) while the other two ships targeted Kuwa. The American gunfire was accurate and Kuwa began taking hits three minutes after they opened fire. The sisters were able to fire their torpedoes before Kuwa was crippled and set on fire by American shells by 00:20. One torpedo, probably fired by Kuwa, struck USS Cooper and broke her in half at 00:13. Take was hit two minutes later by a shell that failed to detonate in the forward engine room. The resulting flooding forced the abandonment of the engine room and the ship escorted her convoy back to Manila using only a single propeller.

Take began repairs after her arrival at Manila on 4 December, but her engine damage was beyond the capabilities of the facilities in the Philippines. Forced to return to Japan, the ship escorted a convoy back home via Taiwan and arrived at Sasebo Naval Arsenal on 15 December. She was present at Kure when aircraft of Task Force 58 attacked Kure on 19 March 1945, but was not damaged. Take was modified on 20 April with a sloping ramp that overhung her stern to operate a Kaiten manned torpedo. The destroyer was turned over to Allied forces at Maizuru at the time of the surrender of Japan on 2 September and was stricken from the navy list on 5 October. She was disarmed and used to repatriate Japanese personnel in 1945–1947. Take was turned over to Great Britain on 14 August of the latter year and scrapped the following year in Singapore.

== Bibliography ==
- Dodson, Aidan & Cant, Serena (2020). Spoils of War: The Fate of Enemy Fleets after Two World Wars. Barnsley, UK: Seaforth Publishing. ISBN 978-1-5267-4198-1.
- Jentschura, Hansgeorg; Jung, Dieter & Mickel, Peter (1977). Warships of the Imperial Japanese Navy, 1869–1945. Annapolis, Maryland: United States Naval Institute. ISBN 0-87021-893-X.
- O'Hara, Vincent P. (2007). The U.S. Navy against the Axis: Surface Combat, 1941 – 1945. Annapolis, Maryland: Naval Institute Press. ISBN 978-1-59114-650-6.
- Nevitt, Allyn D. (23 April 2023). "IJN Take: Tabular Record of Movement". www.combinedfleet.com.
- Nevitt, Allyn D. (15 July 2002). "The TA Operations of Leyte, Part II". www.combinedfleet.com.
- Rohwer, Jürgen (2005). Chronology of the War at Sea 1939–1945: The Naval History of World War Two (Third Revised ed.). Annapolis, Maryland: Naval Institute Press. ISBN 1-59114-119-2.
- Stille, Mark (2013). Imperial Japanese Navy Destroyers 1919–45 (2): Asahio to Tachibana Classes. Botley, UK: Osprey Publishing. ISBN 978-1-84908-987-6.
- Sturton, Ian (1980). "Japan". In Chesneau, Roger (ed.). Conway's All the World's Fighting Ships 1922–1946. Greenwich, UK: Conway Maritime Press. ISBN 0-85177-146-7.
- Whitley, M. J. (1988). Destroyers of World War Two: An International Encyclopedia. Annapolis, Maryland: Naval Institute Press. ISBN 0-87021-326-1.
