= Japanese destroyer Kuwa (1944) =

Destroyer of the Imperial Japanese Navy

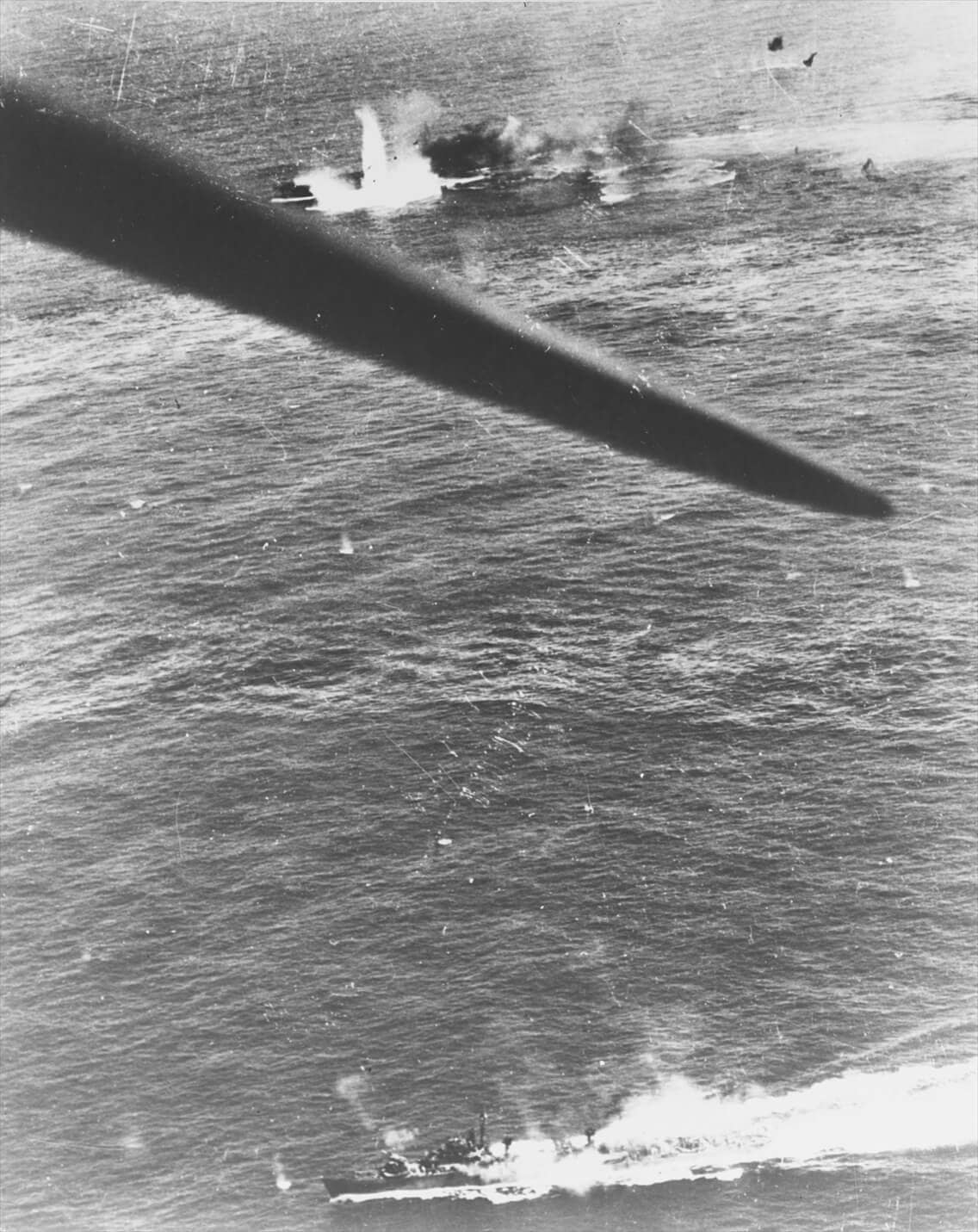
- Kuwa under air attacks during the battle of Leyte Gulf, 25 October 1944

History

Empire of Japan
- Name: Kuwa
- Namesake: Mulberry
- Builder: Fujinagata Shipyards, Osaka
- Laid down: 20 December 1943
- Launched: 25 May 1944
- Completed: 25 July 1944
- Stricken: 10 February 1945
- Fate: Sunk by gunfire, 3 December 1944

General characteristics
- Class & type: Matsu-class escort destroyer
- Displacement: 1,282 t (1,262 long tons) (standard)
- Length: 100 m (328 ft 1 in) (o/a)
- Beam: 9.35 m (30 ft 8 in)
- Draft: 3.3 m (10 ft 10 in)
- Installed power: 2 × water-tube boilers; 19,000 shp (14,000 kW)
- Propulsion: 2 shafts, 2 × geared steam turbines
- Speed: 27.8 knots (51.5 km/h; 32.0 mph)
- Range: 4,680 nmi (8,670 km; 5,390 mi) at 16 knots (30 km/h; 18 mph)
- Complement: 210
- Sensors & processing systems: 1 × Type 22 search radar; 1 × Type 13 early-warning radar
- Armament: 1 × twin, 1 × single 127 mm (5 in) DP guns; 4 × triple, 13 × single 25 mm (1 in) AA guns; 1 × quadruple 610 mm (24 in) torpedo tubes; 2 × rails, 2 × throwers for 36 depth charges

Kuwa (桑; "Mulberry") was one of 18 Matsu-class escort destroyers built for the Imperial Japanese Navy (IJN) during World War II. Completed in mid-1944, the ship played a minor role in the Battle off Cape Engaño in October and began escorting convoys the following month. She was sunk by American destroyers during the Battle of Ormoc Bay on 3 December.

== Design and description ==
Designed for ease of production, the Matsu class was smaller, slower and more lightly armed than previous destroyers as the IJN intended them for second-line duties like escorting convoys, releasing the larger ships for missions with the fleet. The ships measured 100 meters (328 ft 1 in) long overall, with a beam of 9.35 meters (30 ft 8 in) and a draft of 3.3 meters (10 ft 10 in). Their crew numbered 210 officers and enlisted men. They displaced 1,282 metric tons (1,262 long tons) at standard load and 1,554 metric tons (1,529 long tons) at deep load. The ships had two Kampon geared steam turbines, each driving one propeller shaft, using steam provided by two Kampon water-tube boilers. The turbines were rated at a total of 19,000 shaft horsepower (14,000 kW) for a speed of 27.8 knots (51.5 km/h; 32.0 mph). The Matsus had a range of 4,680 nautical miles (8,670 km; 5,390 mi) at 16 knots (30 km/h; 18 mph).

The main armament of the Matsu-class ships consisted of three 127-millimeter (5 in) Type 89 dual-purpose guns in one twin-gun mount aft and one single mount forward of the superstructure. The single mount was partially protected against spray by a gun shield. The accuracy of the Type 89 guns was severely reduced against aircraft because no high-angle gunnery director was fitted. The ships carried a total of twenty-five 25-millimeter (1 in) Type 96 anti-aircraft guns in 4 triple and 13 single mounts. The Matsus were equipped with and Type 22 surface-search radars. The ships were also armed with a single rotating quadruple mount amidships for 610-millimeter (24 in) torpedoes. They could deliver their 36 depth charges via two stern rails and two throwers.

Kuwa may not have been initially fitted with a Type 13 early-warning radar and may also have been equipped with only eight single mounts for Type 96 AA guns when completed. Before the end of 1944, the radar and the additional 25 mm guns had been installed.

== Construction and career ==
Authorized in the late 1942 Modified 5th Naval Armaments Supplement Program, Kuwa was laid down by Fujinagata Shipyards on 20 December 1943 in its Osaka facility and launched on 25 May 1944. Upon her completion on 25 July 1944, Kuwa was assigned to Destroyer Squadron 11 of the Combined Fleet for training. The ship was assigned to Destroyer Division 43 on 18 October and participated in the Battle off Cape Engaño on 25 October as part of Vice-admiral Jisaburō Ozawa's Northern Force. She escorted the aircraft carriers Zuihō and Chiyoda during the battle. Kuwa rescued hundreds of survivors from Zuihō and only stopped when she could fit no more. The ship was attacked by 10 American aircraft as she steamed for Okinawa, but was only lightly damaged. She arrived at Nakagusuku Bay the following day and was able to transfer 310 survivors to the light cruiser Isuzu. The destroyer rendezvoused with the fleet at Amami Ōshima on 27 October and transferred the remaining survivors to the hybrid battleship/carrier Hyūga. The fleet arrived at Kure Naval Arsenal two days later and Kuwa's repairs began.

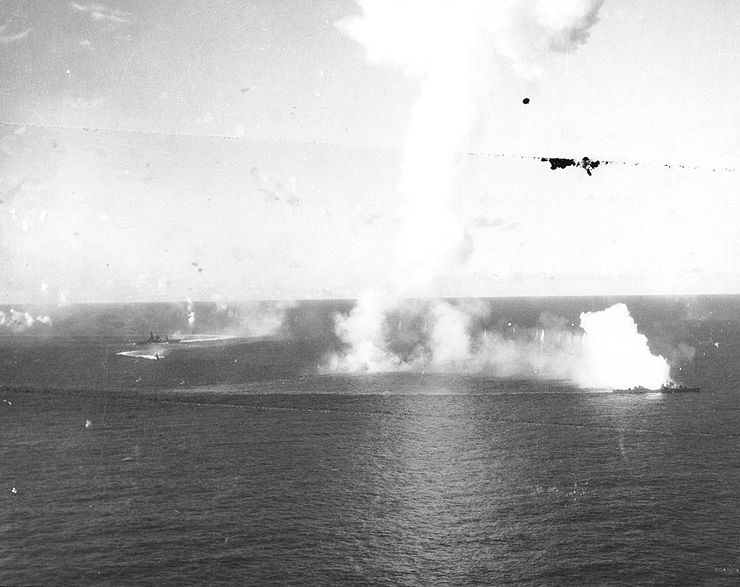
Kuwa is seen to the right ahead of the battleship Ise. The destroyer Akizuki is on fire to the left

While under repairs that lasted until 8 November, the destroyer was transferred to Escort Squadron 31 which was tasked to escort Hyūga and her sister ship Ise as they ferried supplies to Manila at the beginning of November. American air raids deterred the battleships from completing the journey and the ships were diverted to the Spratly Islands; the battleships' cargo was transferred to fast transports on 15–16 November, while Isuzu, Kuwa and two other destroyers proceeded to Manila Bay. Kuwa had been transferred to the newly organized Destroyer Division 52 during this time and was now assigned to the 5th Fleet. She was enroute to Brunei to help build a new seaplane base when Isuzu was torpedoed on 19 November. The cruiser was ordered to Singapore for repairs and Kuwa was ordered to return to Manila.

The destroyer's final operation was to escort the third echelon of Convoy TA-7 from Manila to Ormoc Bay. Arriving there on the night of 2/3 December, Kuwa took up a patrol position seaward of the unloading convoy, while her sister Take loaded survivors from a previous convoy. The convoy had been spotted enroute by American aircraft and three destroyers had been ordered to intercept them. Their radar spotted the Japanese ships at a range of 20,000 yards (18,000 m) at 23:55 and the Americans opened fire at 00:08; Kuwa was engaged by USS Allen M. Sumner at a range of 9,000 yards (8,200 m) and by USS Cooper at 12,000 yards (11,000 m) while the third ship targeted either Take or the transports. The American gunfire was accurate and Kuwa began taking hits three minutes after they opened fire. The ship was able to fire her torpedoes before she was crippled and set on fire by American shells by 00:20. One torpedo, probably fired by Take, struck Cooper and broke her in half at 00:13. Kuwa drifted for an hour or two before sinking at 10°00′N 124°35′E with the loss of about half her crew; as the convoy departed at 03:30, one transport rescued eight survivors. A few other survivors were rescued when the Americans returned to rescue Cooper's survivors; the disposition of the other survivors is uncertain. The ship was struck from the navy list on 10 February 1945.

Kuwa's wreck was discovered in 2002 and explored by an expedition in December 2005. The wreck is upright at a depth of 105 meters (344 ft), but the ship's superstructure has mostly collapsed and the bridge area has been destroyed. The torpedo tube mount is relatively intact and its tubes are empty.

== Bibliography ==
- Jentschura, Hansgeorg; Jung, Dieter & Mickel, Peter (1977). Warships of the Imperial Japanese Navy, 1869–1945. Annapolis, Maryland: United States Naval Institute. ISBN 0-87021-893-X.
- Nevitt, Allyn D. & Tully, Anthony (December 2013). "IJN Kuwa: Tabular Record of Movement". www.combinedfleet.com.
- O'Hara, Vincent P. (2007). The U.S. Navy against the Axis: Surface Combat, 1941 – 1945. Annapolis, Maryland: Naval Institute Press. ISBN 978-1-59114-650-6.
- Rohwer, Jürgen (2005). Chronology of the War at Sea 1939–1945: The Naval History of World War Two (Third Revised ed.). Annapolis, Maryland: Naval Institute Press. ISBN 1-59114-119-2.
- Stille, Mark (2013). Imperial Japanese Navy Destroyers 1919–45 (2): Asahio to Tachibana Classes. Botley, UK: Osprey Publishing. ISBN 978-1-84908-987-6.
- Sturton, Ian (1980). "Japan". In Chesneau, Roger (ed.). Conway's All the World's Fighting Ships 1922–1946. Greenwich, UK: Conway Maritime Press. ISBN 0-85177-146-7.
- Tully, Anthony P. "Shipwrecks of the Rising Sun". www.combinedfleet.com.
- Whitley, M. J. (1988). Destroyers of World War Two: An International Encyclopedia. Annapolis, Maryland: Naval Institute Press. ISBN 0-87021-326-1.
