= USS Moale =

Allen M. Sumner-class destroyer

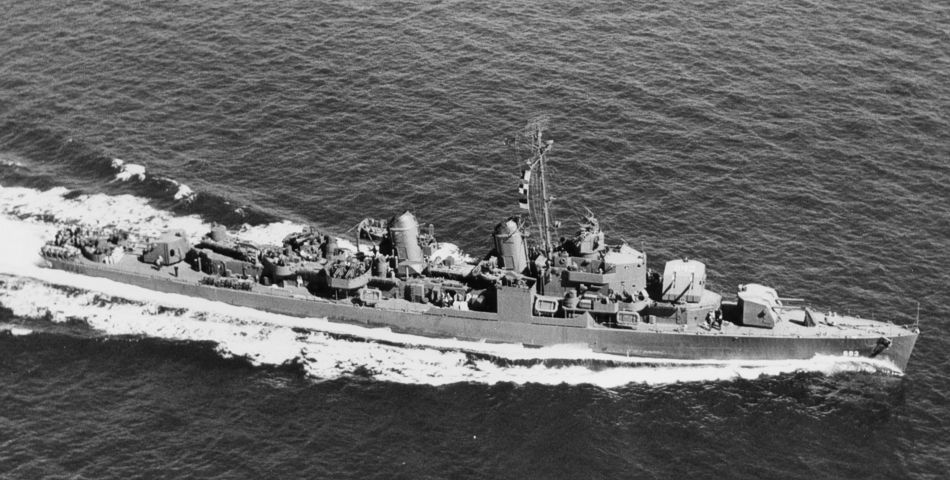
- USS Moale

History

United States
- Name: Moale
- Namesake: Edward Moale, Jr.
- Builder: Federal Shipbuilding and Dry Dock Company
- Laid down: 5 August 1943
- Launched: 16 January 1944
- Commissioned: 28 February 1944
- Decommissioned: 2 July 1973
- Stricken: 2 July 1973
- Fate: Sold for scrapping

General characteristics
- Class & type: Allen M. Sumner-class destroyer
- Displacement: 2,200 tons
- Length: 376 ft 6 in (114.76 m)
- Beam: 40 ft 10 in (12.45 m)
- Draft: 15 ft 8 in (4.78 m)
- Propulsion: 60,000 shp (45,000 kW); 2 propellers
- Speed: 34 knots (63 km/h; 39 mph)
- Range: 6,500 nautical miles (12,000 km; 7,500 mi) at 15 knots (28 km/h; 17 mph)
- Complement: 336
- Armament: 6 × 5-inch 38 caliber guns, 12 × 40 mm AA guns, 11 × 20 mm AA guns, 10 × 21 inch (533 mm) torpedo tubes, 6 × depth charge projectors, 2 × depth charge tracks

USS Moale (DD-693) was the second Allen M. Sumner-class destroyer of the United States Navy.

== Namesake ==
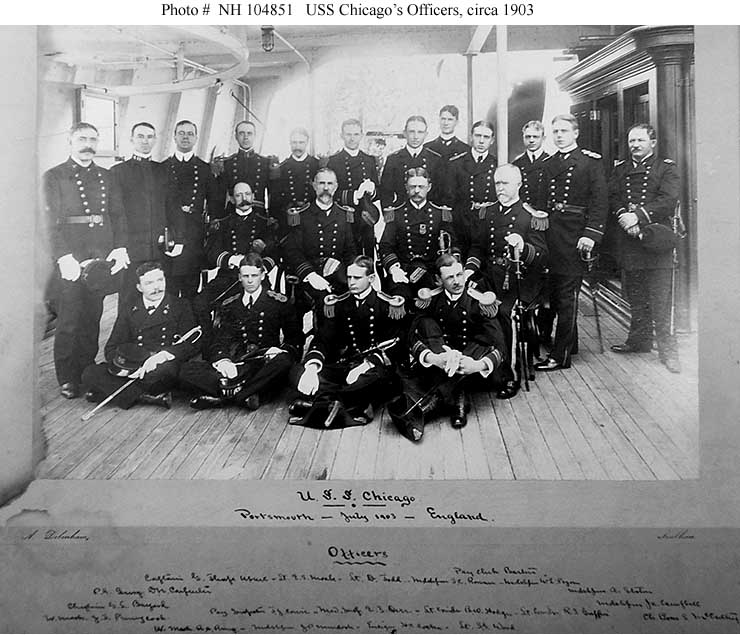
Moale as a lieutenant, standing sixth from the left in the back row in this photograph of the officers of the protected cruiser USS Chicago, ca. 1903.

Edward Moale Jr. was born on 10 September 1866 at Little Rock, Arkansas. He was appointed a naval cadet in 1882 and commissioned an ensign, 1 July 1889. As an officer on board gunboat USS Helena in 1898, he took part in operations against Spanish land and naval forces at Santiago de Cuba, including the naval battle of 3 July. Helena subsequently sailed east, around the Cape of Good Hope, and across the Indian Ocean to the Philippines. There, Lieutenant Moale participated in operations, off northern Luzon, to assist the U.S. Army during the Philippine–American War, 1890–1900. Lt. Moale later served on the USS Scindia, USS San Francisco, USS Chicago and USS Brooklyn. He died 23 October 1903, at Baltimore, Maryland, from illness contracted during land operations in the Cagayan Valley (Philippines) swamps in 1899.

== Construction and commissioning ==
Moale was laid down 5 August 1943 by the Federal Shipbuilding and Dry Dock Company, Kearny, N.J.; launched 16 January 1944; sponsored by Mrs. Edward S. Moale, daughter-in-law of Lieutenant Moale Jr.; and commissioned in the Brooklyn Navy Yard 28 February 1944.

== Service history ==
=== World War II ===
Following a Bermuda shakedown, Moale remained on the Atlantic coast conducting experimental tests and training precommissioning destroyer crews. On 21 August, she rendezvoused with the newly commissioned Missouri, Alaska, and Destroyer Division 120 (DesDiv 120) and got underway for Trinidad in the British West Indies, whence she continued to the Panama Canal Zone, and, thence to San Pedro, California. Reporting to the Commander Destroyers, Pacific Fleet (ComDesPac), at Pearl Harbor, 15 September, she underwent carrier screening, night firing, and shore bombardment exercises until 23 October. She then departed for the Western Carolines as a unit of Destroyer Squadron 60 (DesRon 60). Arriving at Ulithi 5 November, she joined the 3rd Fleet's Fast Carrier Task Force (TF 38, later 5th Fleet's TF 58), and got underway the same day to screen the carriers as their planes conducted strikes against Japanese targets on Leyte, Luzon and Mindoro. Returning to Ulithi 22 November, she was underway again on the 27th to report for duty with the 7th Fleet.

Joining Task Group 77.2 (TG 77.2), 29 November, in San Pedro Bay, she patrolled Leyte Gulf and participated in the Battle of Ormoc Bay. On 2 December 1944, she was joined by the destroyers Allen M. Sumner and Cooper for a midnight raid of enemy troop reinforcement at the western Leyte port of Ormoc. The three destroyers found themselves in confined waters, battered by continuous air attacks, two Japanese destroyers, several PT boats or fast motor launches, and one or more submarines, plus shore batteries. The enemy destroyer Kuwa was sunk by gunfire from the three ships, but Take torpedoed and sank Cooper with the loss of 191 crewmen and 13 officers. Moale suffered three dead and twenty-five wounded. Allen M. Sumner recorded no fatalities but had 11 wounded. On 12 December, Moale shifted to TG 77.3 and took up a screening position with the Mindoro assault force. On 15 December, she provided fire support for the troops and antiaircraft protection for the ships in the transport area of Mangarin Bay. About ten kamikazes attacked the LSTs of the landing force. At least one plane was shot down by Moale's gunners, but two ships were hit. Moale went alongside LST-738 to assist fighting the resulting fire, suffering damage, but the LST had to be abandoned and sunk. Moale suffered one fatality and thirteen wounded. Moale picked up 88 survivors from LST-738 including the ship's captain.

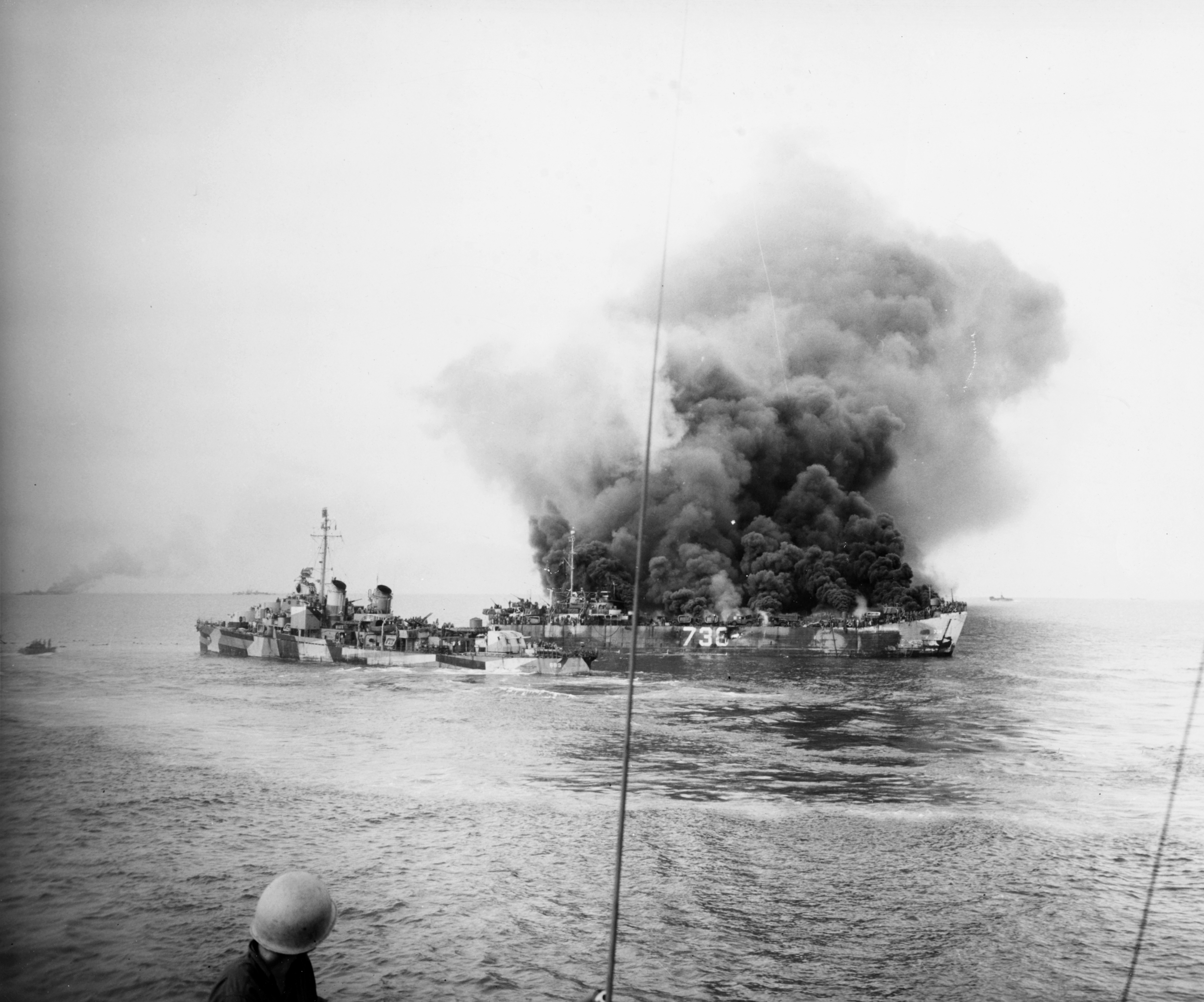
Moale stands by near LST-738 which is burning after she was hit by a kamikaze off the Mindoro landing beaches, 15 December 1944.is nearby. Smoke in the left distance may be from LST-472, which was also hit by the kamikaze attack.

Moale set sail for Leyte Gulf 17 December. Arriving on the next day, she completed a high speed cargo run to Ulithi and back by the end of the year. On 3 January 1945, she was once again en route to an assault area. Steaming with Vice Admiral Jesse Oldendorf's Bombardment & Fire Support Group TG 77.2, she arrived off Luzon on 6 January and commenced screening the heavy ships to seaward as they bombarded San Fernando and other enemy concentrations in the beachhead area at Lingayen Gulf. On 9 January, she took up gunfire support duties, alternating such duties with antisubmarine and antiaircraft operations. The destroyer operated with the Luzon covering group until 22 January. She then returned to Leyte, whence she joined the 5th Fleet and steamed back to Ulithi to resume operations with the Fast Carrier Forces, now designated TF 58. On 10 February, the force sortied from Ulithi and on 16–17 February, strikes were conducted against the enemy's capital to prevent aid from being sent to the Japanese defenders on Iwo Jima. Two ships of DesRon 60, Barton and Ingraham, were damaged when they collided on 16 February and on 17 February Moale was detached to escort them back to Saipan. While en route, Moale assisted in the sinking of an enemy armed merchantman and a small coastal vessel. Ordered back on 18 February, she rendezvoused with TG 58.4 on 19 February and, on 21 February, screened the carriers as they provided air cover for the marines' on Iwo Jima.

Having sustained extensive damage to her deck and No. 1 mount during heavy seas with 40-foot (12 m) swells, Moale departed the Volcano Islands, 25 February, and sailed eastward for repairs at Pearl Harbor. On 3 June, she returned to Ulithi, getting underway for the combat area the next day. Arriving at Hagushi Anchorage, Okinawa, 7 June, she reported to CTG 31.5 and immediately became part of the antiaircraft defenses of the area. Through 27 June she served on radar picket stations, where danger remained present and alerts still frequent, even though the pressure was not as great as in April and May. On 28 June, Moale departed for Leyte, where she joined Task Group 32.12 of the Third Fleet and returned to Okinawa to act as part of the covering force for minesweepers in Operation Juneau. At the end of the month, Moale once again anchored in San Pedro Bay, Leyte. There, on 15 August, she received word of the Japanese surrender. On 20 August, she sailed to rendezvous with TG 38.4 off the coast of Japan, and for the next month she steamed off that coast, serving as a weather ship and air route radio beacon. On 27 September she departed Tokyo Bay, proceeding, via Guam, to the west coast and peacetime duty.

=== 1945–1973 ===
Following the end of World War II the assignments of Moale were varied. She had the honor of escorting the first ship bearing war dead back to the United States. Moale remained in operation off the west coast until 21 May 1946, when she sailed for Bikini to join TF 1 for Operation Crossroads, the atom bomb test taking place there, returning to the west coast for overhaul at Puget Sound Naval Shipyard 22 August. Overhaul completed in January 1947, she conducted operations along the California coast until March. She then deployed to the western Pacific for 6 months prior to reporting to the Fleet Sonar School at San Diego for duty as a training ship. In the spring of 1949, Moale, with DesDiv 72, was transferred to the Atlantic Fleet. Arriving at Norfolk at the end of April, she participated in training exercises in the western Atlantic until November 1950, when she sailed eastward for her first 6th Fleet deployment. Similar operational schedules, alternate east coast and Mediterranean duties, were followed until 24 April 1953, when Moale departed on an around-the-world voyage. During that cruise, which ended at Norfolk, Virginia, 27 October, the destroyer spent 4 months with the UN forces off the coast of Korea. During June and July, she operated with TF 77 and TF 95, remaining after the truce as a unit of the security patrol.

From 1954, into 1969, Moale's employment schedule included operations in the Atlantic, North Sea, and the Caribbean, with regular rotation to the Mediterranean for duty with the 6th Fleet. Highlights of her career during this period were patrol duty in the Eastern Mediterranean during the Suez Crisis of 1956; duty as a recovery ship for the Mercury 7 mission of astronaut Scott Carpenter, May 1962; participation in the American blockade of Cuba during the Cuban Missile Crisis, October–November 1962; and standby duty for the evacuation of American nationals from Cyprus in 1964. In 1967, Moale was recognized for outstanding performance in Anti-Submarine Warfare (ASW) by winning the ASW trophy for the Atlantic Fleet. She also won the Battle Efficiency "E" Award for Destroyer Squadron 10. Moale concluded her service as part of the Reserve Destroyer Squadron 302 based at the Brooklyn Naval Yard.

Moale was decommissioned on 2 July 1973.

== Awards ==
Moale received five battle stars for her service in World War II, and one star for Korea. She also received the Battle Efficiency "E" Award and the Anti-Submarine Trophy.
