= USS Allen M. Sumner =

Allen M. Sumner-class destroyer

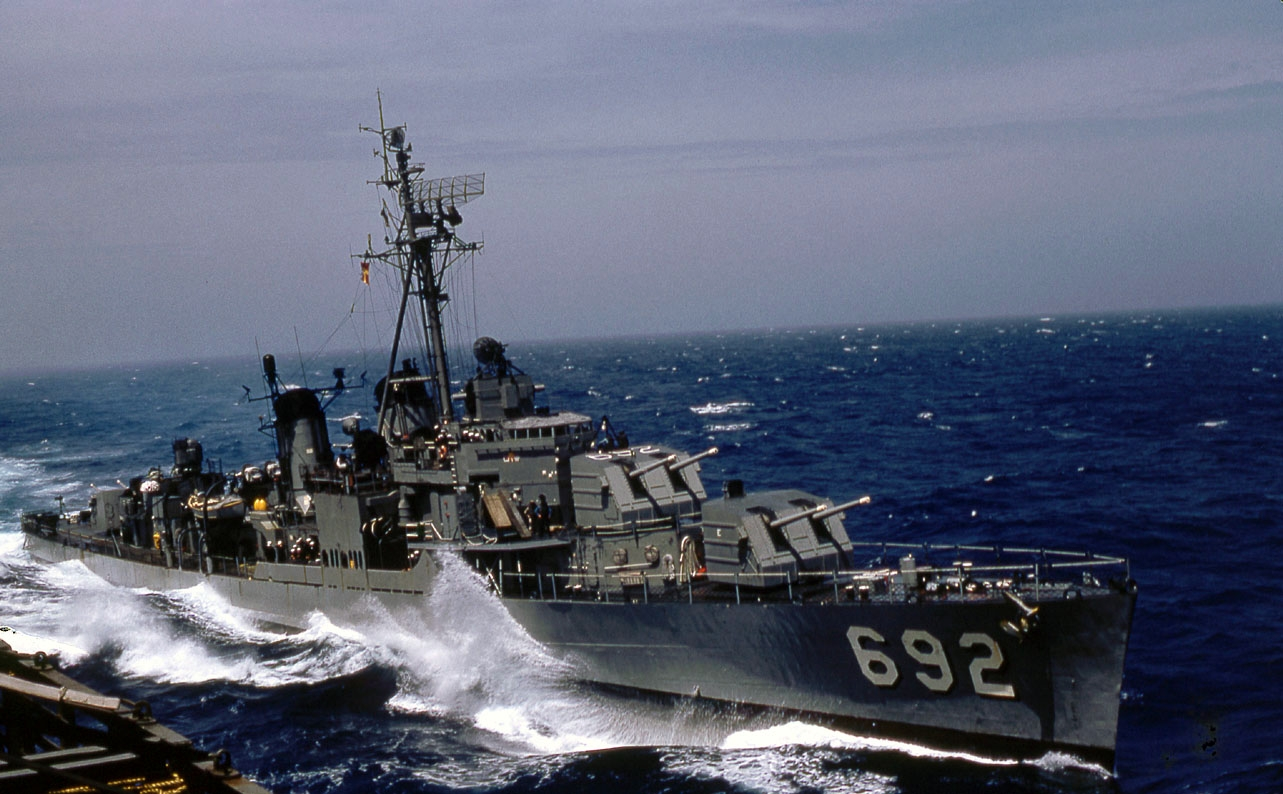
- USS Allen M. Sumner (DD-692) in April 1959

History

United States
- Name: Allen M. Sumner
- Namesake: Allen Melancthon Sumner
- Ordered: 7 August 1942
- Builder: Federal Shipbuilding and Drydock Company
- Laid down: 7 July 1943
- Launched: 15 December 1943
- Commissioned: 26 January 1944
- Decommissioned: 15 August 1973
- Stricken: 15 August 1973
- Motto: Sui Generis
- Fate: Sold for scrap on 16 October 1974

General characteristics
- Class & type: Allen M. Sumner-class destroyer
- Displacement: Design; 2,890 tons; Standard; 2,200; Full load; 3,315 tons
- Length: 376 ft 6 in (114.76 m)
- Beam: 40 ft (12 m)
- Draft: 15 ft 8 in (4.78 m)
- Propulsion: 60,000 shp (45,000 kW); 2 propellers
- Speed: 34 knots (63 km/h; 39 mph)
- Range: 6,500 nautical miles (12,000 km; 7,500 mi) at 15 knots (28 km/h; 17 mph)
- Complement: 336 officers and enlisted
- Armament: 6 × 5 in (130 mm)/38 calibre guns; 12 × 40 mm AA guns; 11 × 20 mm AA guns; 10 × 21-inch (533 mm) torpedo tubes; 6 × depth charge projectors; 2 × depth charge tracks
- Aircraft carried: Gyrodyne QH-50 DASH (years 1960)

USS Allen M. Sumner (DD-692), was the lead ship of her class of destroyers. The ship was named for Allen Melancthon Sumner, a United States Marine Corps captain, who was killed in action during World War I.

Allen M. Sumner was laid down on 7 July 1943 at Kearny, New Jersey, by the Federal Shipbuilding and Drydock Company; launched on 15 December 1943; sponsored by Mrs. Allen M. Sumner, Captain Sumner's widow; and commissioned at the New York Navy Yard on 26 January 1944.

== Service history ==
=== World War II ===
==== 1944 ====
The destroyer was fitted out at the New York Navy Yard until 3 March when she got underway for shakedown training in the waters around Bermuda. Allen M. Sumner returned to New York on 8 April and commenced post-shakedown availability. Repairs were completed on 3 May, and the warship stood out of New York bound for Norfolk, Virginia. She arrived there the following day and began two months of duty as a training platform for destroyer nucleus crews. The warship headed north on 5 July and arrived back at New York the next day. Following a five-week availability at the navy yard there, Allen M. Sumner put to sea on 12 August, bound ultimately for the Pacific. Along the way, she conducted antisubmarine warfare and antiair warfare exercises, stopped briefly at Norfolk, and transited the Panama Canal on 29 August. The destroyer stayed overnight at San Diego on 7 and 8 September before continuing on to Hawaii. She arrived at Pearl Harbor on 14 September and began five weeks of exercises in the Hawaiian operating area.

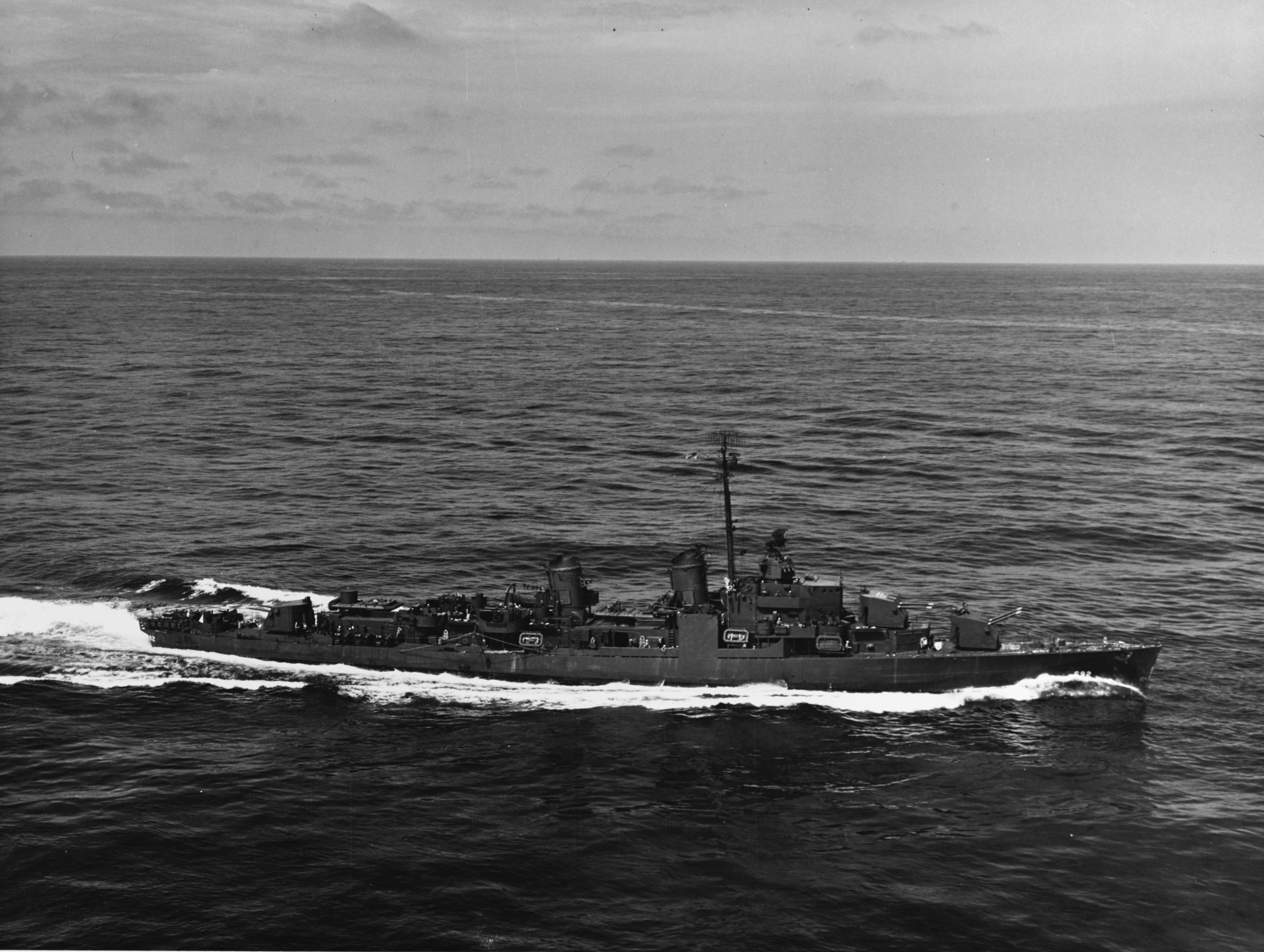
Allen M. Sumner in the Atlantic, 26 March 1944

Her stay in Hawaii lasted until 23 October when she steamed out of Pearl Harbor in company with the battleship North Carolina, bound for duty in the western Pacific with the Fast Carrier Task Force. Steaming via Eniwetok, the destroyer entered Ulithi lagoon on 5 November. Allen M. Sumner remained at Ulithi until 19 November at which time she departed the atoll to join Task Group (TG) 38.4 at sea. After rendezvousing with the carriers, she accompanied them to waters near Yap Island whence the aircraft carriers launched air strikes on 22 November before reentering Ulithi that same day. The destroyer remained there for 5 days and then returned to sea, bound for newly invaded Leyte in the Philippines. She arrived in San Pedro Bay on 29 November and began patrolling Leyte Gulf. That duty—punctuated intermittently by air alerts—lasted until the evening of 2 December when Allen M. Sumner set course for Ormoc Bay in company with the destroyers Moale and Cooper.

Reports from American aircraft earlier that day had indicated that an enemy reinforcement convoy was entering the bay that night, and the three warships were sent to destroy it. Just after 2300 that night, the destroyers suffered the first of many air attacks when a Mitsubishi Ki-46 "Dinah" – a fast, twin-engine, reconnaissance plane – dropped a bomb which near-missed Allen M. Sumner about 30 yards (27 m) from the ship's starboard bow, pierced her hull with fragments, and started a fire on board. Bomb fragments also wounded one officer and 12 men.

Air attacks continued; but, just after midnight, the three destroyers made surface radar contact on a pair of Japanese destroyers later identified as Kuwa and Take. Less than 10 minutes into the battle, Kuwa succumbed to the combined fire of the two destroyers, and the wrecked and burning mass began to sink. Take, however, evened the score just as Allen M. Sumner and Cooper joined Moale in firing on the remaining Japanese warship. One of her torpedoes slammed into Cooper amidships, broke that American destroyer's back, and sank her almost immediately. Less than half of Cooper's crew managed to get off the ship. Most of those were later rescued—but by PBY Catalinas rather than by Cooper's division mates who were still being subjected to heavy shore battery fire and air raids. Any attempt at rescue by Allen M. Sumner and Moale would have made them virtually stationary targets. At about 0145 on the 3rd, the two remaining American warships began retirement from Ormoc Bay and set a course for San Pedro Bay where they arrived later that day.

Allen M. Sumner spent the next nine days in San Pedro Bay undergoing upkeep and repairing the minor damage that she had suffered in the action at Ormoc Bay. Though the area was subjected to intermittent air raids throughout that period, Allen M. Sumner recorded only one, long-range—in excess of 9,000 yards (8,200 m)—approach by an enemy aircraft on 6 December. On 12 December, she departed San Pedro Bay and joined the screen of TG 78.3, bound for the landings on Mindoro Island. That task group constituted Rear Admiral Arthur D. Struble's Mindoro Attack Group. Although the group came under air attack during the transit, Allen M. Sumner escaped damage. On 15 December, she moved in with the close covering group to participate in the preinvasion shore bombardment, and the subsequent landings went forward against negligible opposition. Some enemy aircraft attempted to attack the invasion force, and Allen M. Sumner joined Moale and Ingraham in splashing an enemy light bomber. On the following day, the destroyer departed Mindoro to return to Leyte where she arrived on 18 December. Between 26 and 29 December, the warship escorted a resupply echelon to Mindoro and back to San Pedro Bay.

==== 1945 ====
On 2 January 1945, the destroyer stood out of San Pedro Bay, bound for the invasion of Luzon at Lingayen Gulf in the screen for the cruisers and battleships of Vice Admiral Jesse B. Oldendorf's Bombardment and Fire Support Group (TG 77.2). Early on 6 January, Allen M. Sumner moved into Lingayen Gulf to support minesweeping operations. Around noon, her unit came under air attack by kamikazes. The first plane retreated in the face of a heavy antiaircraft barrage while the second attacker hovered just out of range as a decoy to mask a run in by a third suicider. The latter plane dove on Allen M. Sumner strafing as he came. He swooped in out of the sun on the destroyer's port bow and crashed into her near the after stack and after torpedo mount. The warship lost 14 men killed and 19 injured. Extensive damage required her to retire from the gulf and join the heavy units of TG 77.2. Nevertheless, Allen M. Sumner remained in action with that unit and supported the Lingayen operation until 14 January.

On that day, she began a long and somewhat circuitous voyage back to the United States for repairs. She arrived at Manus in the Admiralties on 18 January and remained there for nine days. She got underway again on 27 January in company with the escort carrier Kadashan Bay and, after stopping at Majuro en route, arrived in Pearl Harbor on 6 February. She departed Oahu the next day and arrived at Hunters Point, California, on 13 February to begin repairs. Her renewal work was completed on 10 April and, four days later, she began duty training prospective destroyer crews along the west coast. Just over three months later, on 17 July, she was relieved of training duty and departed San Francisco to return to the western Pacific. The destroyer arrived at Oahu on the 23rd and began three weeks of training operations out of Pearl Harbor.

On 12 August, Allen M. Summer stood out of Hawaii to return to the war zone. However, when she was two days out, the Japanese capitulated. Nevertheless, the warship continued her voyage west. Following a two-day stop at Eniwetok, she got underway again on 21 August and, six-days later, rendezvoused with TG 38.3 in Japanese waters. After some three weeks of postwar patrols, first with TG 38.3 and later with TG 38.1, the destroyer put into Tokyo Bay on 16 September. She remained there only six days before getting underway for the Marianas on 22 August. The ship reached Saipan three days later but soon resumed her voyage back to the United States arriving on the west coast in October and assuming duty as a training platform for prospective destroyer crews.

=== 1946 to 1952 ===
These operations continued until May 1946 when the destroyer departed the west coast, bound for the Central Pacific to support Operation Crossroads, the atomic bomb tests conducted at Bikini Atoll in the Marshall Islands. At the conclusion of that assignment late that summer, she returned to her former west coast duty. On 23 February 1947, Allen M. Sumner began an extended cruise to the Far East which included visits to Australia, the Marianas, the Philippines, China, and Japan before her return to the west coast for an overhaul and subsequent local operations.

That duty continued until early in 1949 at which time the ship was reassigned to the Atlantic Fleet. She transited the Panama Canal in mid-April and arrived in Hampton Roads, Virginia, on 20 April. Between the spring of 1949 and the spring of 1953, the destroyer conducted normal peacetime operations out of Norfolk. That routine was broken only by a tour of duty in the Mediterranean Sea with the 6th Fleet between November 1950 and March 1951. Otherwise, she cruised along the eastern seaboard and in the West Indies conducting training—particularly in antisubmarine warfare.

=== 1953 to 1966 ===
On 24 April 1953, the destroyer stood out of Norfolk, bound for her only assignment in the war zone during the Korean War. Steaming by way of the Mediterranean Sea, the Suez Canal, and Indian Ocean, Allen M. Sumner arrived in Yokosuka, Japan, early in June. After 10 days in port, she joined Task Force (TF) 77 in the Sea of Japan and began two months of duty as a plane guard and antisubmarine screening ship for the fast carriers while they sent their aircraft against targets in North Korea. While she was assigned those tasks, the armistice of 27 July ended the Korean War. Following a tour of duty with TF 95 patrolling the southern coast of Korea and a brief stop at Yokosuka, the warship headed back to the United States via the Pacific, the west coast, and the Panama Canal. She arrived back in Norfolk on 27 October.

Over the next eight years, Allen M. Sumner alternated east coast and West Indies operations with seven deployments to European waters. During the first two—conducted in the fall of 1954 and the summer of 1955, respectively—she visited northern European waters to participate in exercises with units of other NATO navies. The third European deployment—to the Mediterranean—came in July 1956. During that four-month assignment, the Suez Crisis erupted, and Allen M. Sumner supported the evacuation of American citizens from Egypt at Alexandria. On the fourth deployment of the period, she returned to northern European waters in September and October 1957. In February 1958, she embarked upon another deployment to the Mediterranean that lasted until July. After a period of normal east coast operations, the destroyer once again headed toward the "middle sea" in February 1958. That tour of duty differed from those preceding in that Allen M. Sumner was assigned to independent duty in the Persian Gulf and in the western portion of the Indian Ocean. She returned to the United States on 30 August and began a year of normal operations in the western Atlantic. In September 1960, the warship voyaged to the Mediterranean once more and again served on independent duty in the Persian Gulf and in the western Indian Ocean. She returned to the United States on 19 April 1961 and, on 17 May, began a fleet rehabilitation and modernization overhaul during which her antisubmarine warfare capabilities were improved and updated.

Allen M. Sumner completed her overhaul on 2 January 1962 and resumed her schedule of east coast operations alternated with Mediterranean cruises. Between March and September 1962, she served with the 6th Fleet. Soon after her return to American waters, President John F. Kennedy declared a "quarantine" of Cuba in response to the siting of offensive Soviet missiles on that island. Allen M. Sumner was one of the first warships to take up station off Cuba in October 1962. At the successful conclusion of that operation, she resumed normal duty out of Mayport, Florida. That employment—including frequent duty as school ship for the Fleet Sonar School—continued through 1963 and into 1964. In June and July 1964, the destroyer made a brief deployment to the Mediterranean for a midshipman cruise. Upon her return to the western hemisphere, she resumed normal duty out of Mayport. In the spring of 1965, political unrest in the Dominican Republic took her to the waters around that troubled island. Upon concluding that assignment, the destroyer returned to Mayport and resumed operations out of that port. In October, she embarked upon another deployment in the Mediterranean. After a routine tour of duty with the 6th Fleet in the "middle sea," Allen M. Sumner returned to Mayport on 8 March 1966 and began 11 months of operations out of her home port which included duty as a support ship for the Gemini 10 space shot in July.

=== Vietnam ===
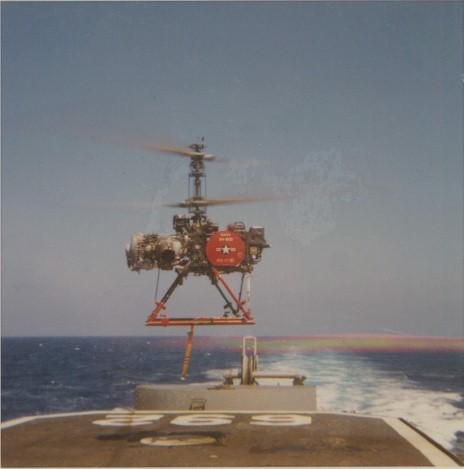
A Gyrodyne QH-50 DASH drone hovering over Allen M. Sumner's flight deck, 1969.

On 7 February 1967, the destroyer departed Mayport on her way to her first and only deployment to the Vietnam war zone. Steaming via the Panama Canal and Hawaii, she arrived in Yokosuka, Japan, on 14 March. Four days later, she got underway for the coast of Vietnam. On her first tour in the Gulf of Tonkin, Allen M. Sumner served as "shotgun" (screening ship) for Long Beach while the nuclear-powered guided missile cruiser served on positive identification radar advisory zone duty in the gulf. She was relieved of that assignment on 5 April to participate in Operation Seadragon, the interdiction of communist waterborne logistics operations. That assignment lasted until 11 April, when she joined the screen of the aircraft carrier Hancock for a voyage to Sasebo, Japan. She remained at Sasebo from 15 to 22 April before heading back to the Gulf of Tonkin again in company with Hancock. Upon her return to Vietnamese waters, Allen M. Sumner moved inshore with the Australian cruiser Hobart to resume "Sea-dragon" duty and, later, to provide shore bombardment support for marines engaged in Operation Beau Charger, a combined waterborne and airborne amphibious assault conducted near the demilitarized zone late in May.

At the end of May, she rejoined the fast carriers on Yankee Station and screened them until 10 June when she resumed "Seadragon" duty. Her work closer to the Vietnam coast lasted for 12 days. On 22 June, she departed Vietnamese waters and set a course for Kaohsiung, Taiwan, where she visited from 26 June to 2 July. Departing Kaohsiung on the latter day, Allen M. Sumner called at Hong Kong from 7 to 9 July. On 11 July, she returned to the coast of Vietnam and began a nine-day gunfire support mission. Leaving Vietnamese waters on 20 July, the destroyer made a six-day stop at Subic Bay in the Philippines from 22 to 28 July before returning to the gunline from 30 July to 1 August. She then began her voyage back to the United States; stopped at Yokosuka, Hawaii, and Acapulco, in Mexico; transited the Panama Canal on 7 September, and reached Mayport on 10 September.

=== Post-Vietnam ===
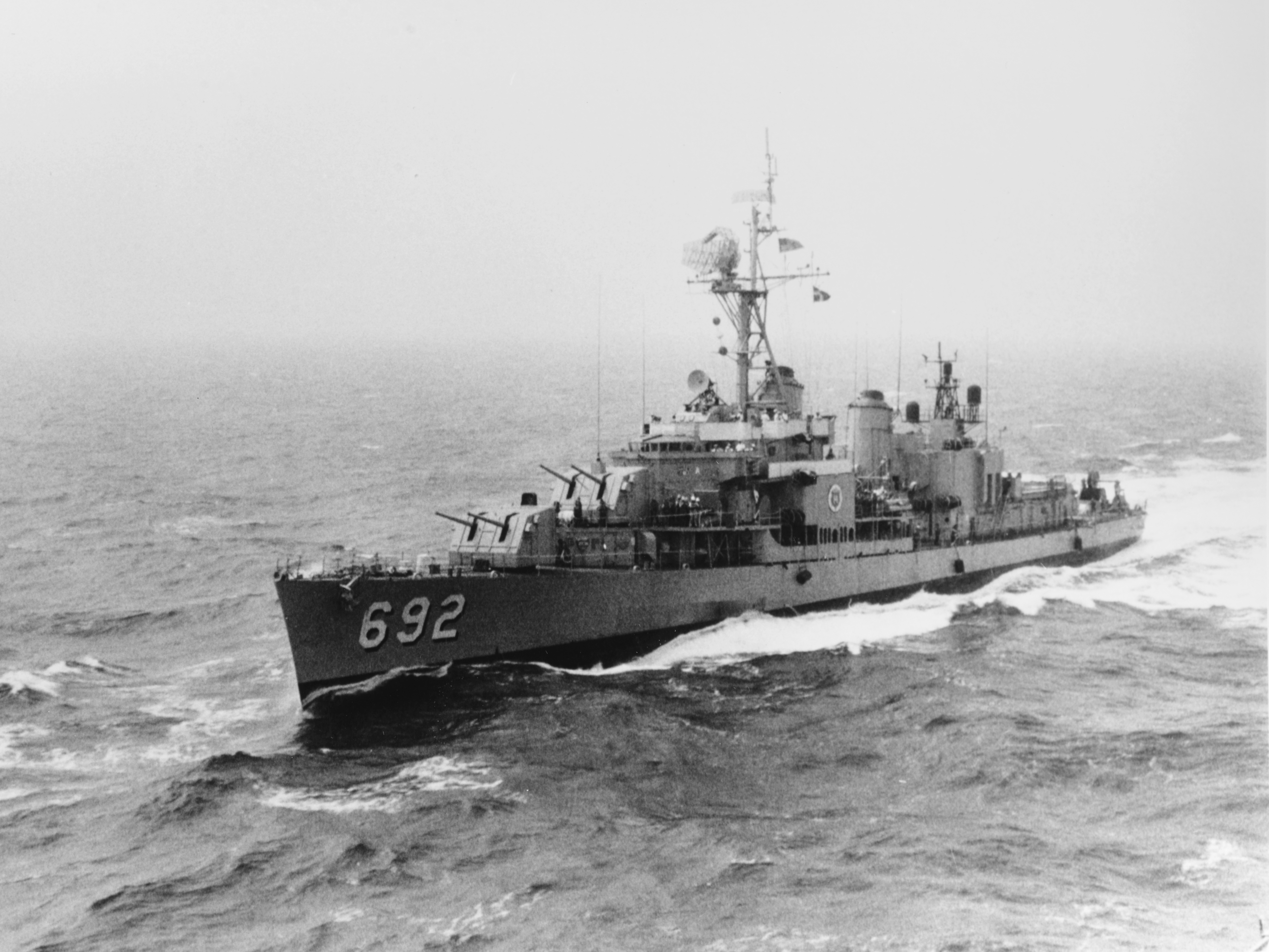
Allen M. Sumner in 1970.

The destroyer resumed normal operations out of Mayport in October. Throughout 1968, she cruised the waters of the West Indies, frequently providing support for the encircled naval base at Guantánamo Bay, Cuba. Similar duty carried her through the first four months of 1969. In May, she voyaged to England and northern European waters to participate in a NATO review celebrating the 20th anniversary of the alliance. On 22 May, she headed for the Mediterranean and a normal tour of duty with the 6th Fleet. She concluded that assignment at Mayport on 10 October. Following 10 months of normal operations put of Mayport, Allen M. Sumner embarked upon the final Mediterranean deployment of her career on 27 August 1970. The destroyer returned to Mayport on 28 February 1971 and briefly resumed normal duty out of her home port. On 1 July 1971, she was reassigned to duty as a Naval Reserve training ship. In mid-August, she moved to Baltimore, Maryland, where she began her Naval Reserve training duties. That employment remained her assignment until 15 August 1973 at which time Allen M. Sumner was decommissioned at Philadelphia. On 16 October 1974, she was sold to the Union Minerals & Alloy Corp. for scrapping.

== Awards ==
Allen M. Sumner earned two battle stars during World War II, one during the Korean War, and two during the Vietnam War.
