= USS Cooper =

Allen M. Sumner-class destroyer

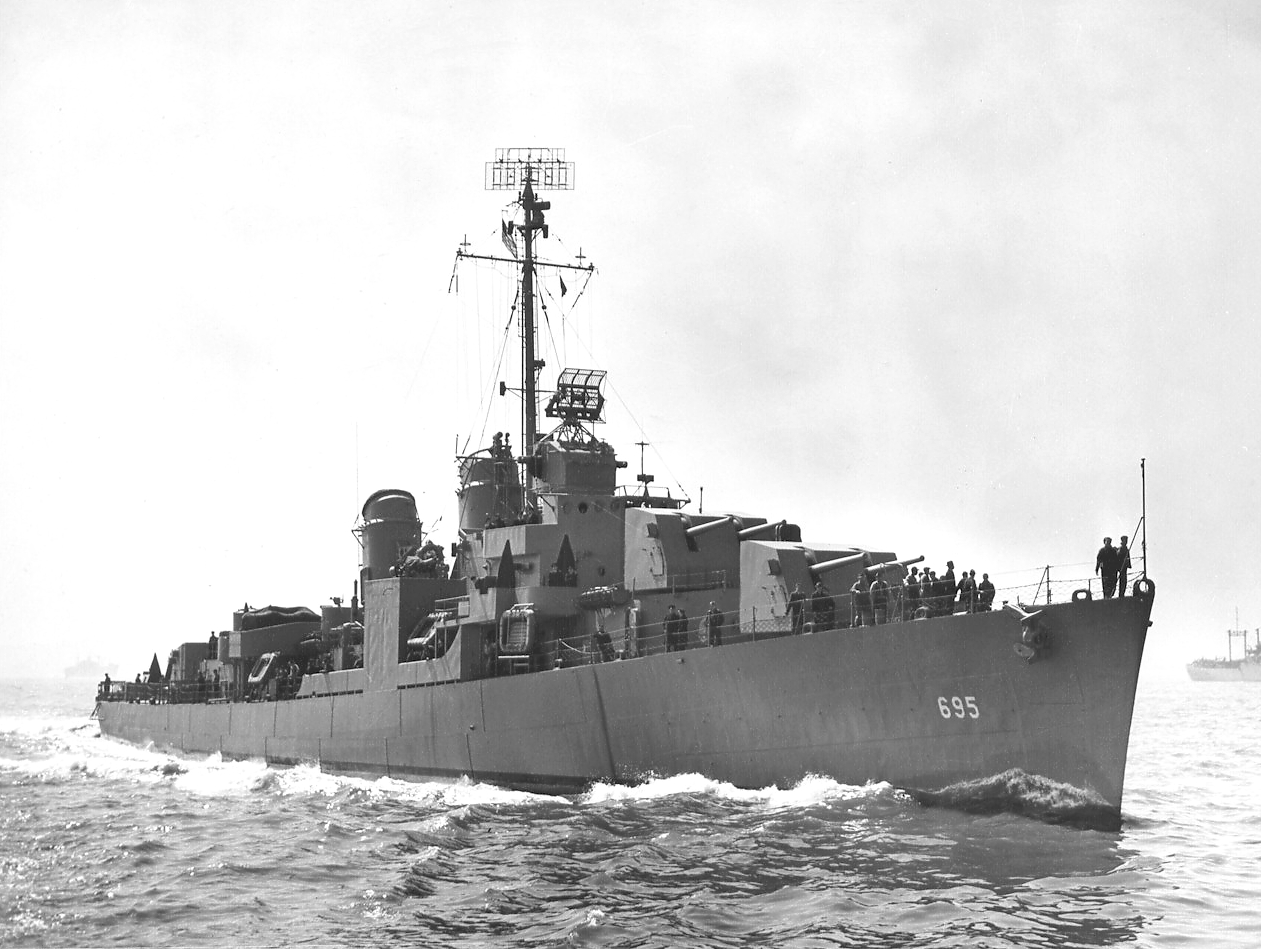
- USS Cooper, in New York before commissioning.

History

United States
- Name: USS Cooper
- Namesake: Elmer Glenn Cooper
- Builder: Federal Shipbuilding and Drydock Company; Kearny, New Jersey
- Laid down: 30 August 1943
- Launched: 9 February 1944
- Sponsored by: Mrs. Elmer G. Cooper
- Commissioned: 27 March 1944
- Stricken: 20 January 1945
- Fate: Torpedoed and sunk by the Japanese destroyer Take in Ormoc Bay, 3 December 1944; 10°54′N 124°36′E

General characteristics
- Class & type: Allen M. Sumner-class destroyer
- Displacement: 2,200 tons
- Length: 376 ft 6 in (114.76 m)
- Beam: 40 ft (12.2 m)
- Draft: 15 ft 8 in (4.78 m)
- Propulsion: 60,000 shp (45,000 kW); 2 propellers
- Speed: 34 knots (63 km/h; 39 mph)
- Range: 6,500 nmi (12,000 km; 7,500 mi) at 15 kn (28 km/h; 17 mph)
- Complement: 336
- Armament: 6 × 5 in (130 mm)/38 guns, 12 × 40 mm AA guns, 11 × 20 mm AA guns, 10 × 21 inch (533 mm) torpedo tubes, 6 × depth charge projectors, 2 × depth charge tracks

USS Cooper (DD-695), was an Allen M. Sumner-class destroyer of the United States Navy.

== Namesake ==
Elmer Glenn Cooper was born on 9 May 1905 in Monticello, Arkansas. He graduated from the United States Naval Academy on 2 June 1927. Remaining at the Naval Academy until 14 July 1927, Cooper completed instruction in aviation before reporting for duty on the battleship USS Maryland on 26 August. He was commissioned Ensign on 6 March 1928. Detaching from the battleship in early November, he next served on the submarine tender USS Holland until 29 May 1929 and then on the destroyer USS Moody through 7 January 1930. He commenced flight training at Naval Air Station Pensacola, Florida on 30 January 1930. Promoted to Lieutenant (junior grade) effective 2 June, he earned his aviator wings on 2 October 1930. He remained at Pensacola until 7 November and then joined Torpedo Squadron 1 (VT-1) on the aircraft carrier USS Lexington on 13 December.

On 31 May 1932, he transferred to Scouting Squadron 6B (VS-6B) embarked in the light cruiser USS Concord. His next assignment took him to the U.S. Fleet Air Base, Coco Solo, in the Panama Canal Zone, reporting to Patrol Squadron 3F (VP-3F) on 30 June 1933. He then served with Bombing Squadron 2B (VB-2B) on USS Saratoga from 24 June 1935. He advanced to the rank of Lieutenant effective 1 July 1936.

On 11 January 1937, Cooper joined VP-11F based at Naval Air Station North Island, San Diego, California. On 2 February 1938, he was at the controls of 11-P-3, a Consolidated PBY Catalina (BuNo 0462), participating with his squadron in the first day of a fleet exercise approximately 70 miles (110 km) west of San Diego, south of San Clemente Island. While flying into a tight formation in the dark during a sudden rain squall, Cooper's flying boat collided with 11-P-4 (BuNo 0463), piloted by Lt. Carlton B. Hutchins. Bursting into flames, 11-P-3 plunged into the Pacific, claiming the lives of Cooper and his six crewmen. Hutchins was able to keep his plane aloft long enough to enable four of his six-man crew to exit the doomed PBY, although one of these men died from his injuries the next day. With 11 fatalities and only three survivors, the collision was at that point in time the worst disaster involving an airplane in the history of the U.S. Navy. Cooper's body was never recovered.

== Construction and commissioning ==
Cooper was launched 9 February 1944 by Federal Shipbuilding and Drydock Company, Kearny, New Jersey; sponsored by Mrs. Elmer G. Cooper; and commissioned 27 March 1944, Commander J. W. Schmidt in command.

== Operational history ==
Cooper cleared Boston, Massachusetts on 23 July 1944 for Pearl Harbor arriving on 4 September. After operational training, she sailed on 23 October for Ulithi, arriving on 5 November, and put to sea at once to screen aircraft carriers in air attacks on Luzon, Ormoc Bay, and Manila Bay until 19 November.

After repairs at Ulithi, she entered San Pedro Bay, Philippines on 29 November and joined in patrols in Leyte Gulf until 2 December, when she sailed with the destroyers Allen M. Sumner and Moale to destroy shipping in Japanese-held Ormoc Bay. Here the ships engaged two small enemy destroyers and numerous small craft. At about 00:13 on 3 December, Cooper was torpedoed by the Take. Reports state that she suffered an explosion on her starboard side, then broke in two, and sank within a minute. The presence of enemy forces prevented rescue of survivors until about 14:00, when "Black Cat" airplanes were able to save 168 of Cooper's crew; 191 were lost.

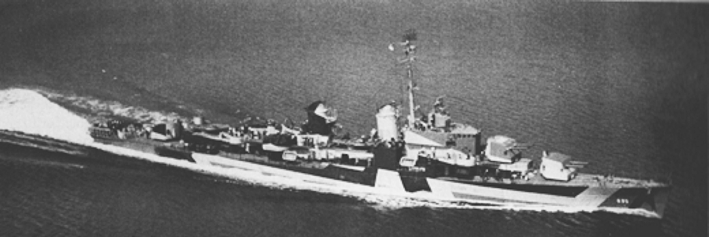
Cooper in late 1944.

In the Battle of Ormoc Bay, Kuwa was sunk and Take was damaged by the American destroyers. In addition to the loss of Cooper, Allen M. Sumner and Moale were both damaged.

Cooper was awarded one battle star for World War II service.

In 2005, Rob Lalumiere became the only diver to have descended to the wreck of USS Cooper, and the only known instance at that time of a shipwreck in the area being positively identified. A memorial plaque was placed beside the shipwreck as a tribute.

In December 2017, a Paul Allen expedition aboard the research ship RV Petrel pinpointed the wreck of Cooper, and conclusively confirmed her identity after cross-referencing the destroyer's armaments and sinking position with historical documents.

== Trivia ==
A documentary TV film, USS Cooper: Return to Ormoc Bay, was produced by Bigfoot Entertainment and made its debut in mid-2006. It featured deep-sea diver Rob Lalumiere and survivors of the Cooper sinking.
