= Battle of Ormoc Bay =

1944 battle in the Pacific theater of WW2

- Part of the Pacific Theatre of World War II
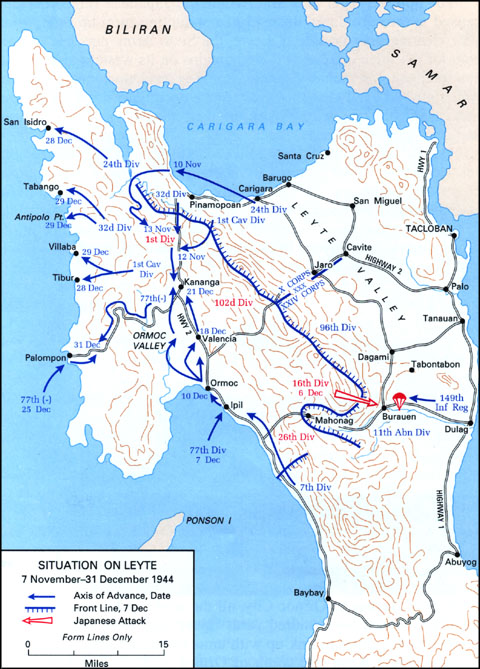
- Leyte campaign, November–December 1944
Date	9 November–21 December 1944
Location	Camotes Sea, Philippines
Result	American victory

Belligerents
United States	Japan

Commanders and leaders
(United States) Douglas MacArthur	(Empire of Japan) Tomoyuki Yamashita

Casualties and losses
6 ships sunk	29 ships sunk 1 submarine sunk 1 patrol boat sunk

The Battle of Ormoc Bay was a series of air-sea battles between Imperial Japan and the United States in the Camotes Sea in the Philippines from 9 November to 21 December 1944, at Ormoc, part of the Battle of Leyte in the Pacific campaign of World War II. The battles resulted from Japanese operations to reinforce and resupply their forces on Leyte and U.S. attempts to interdict them.

== Background ==
After gaining naval control over the Western Pacific in mid-1944, the Allies attacked the Philippines in October, landing troops at Leyte Gulf on the east side of Leyte on 20 October 1944. The island of Leyte was defended by about 20,000 Japanese; American General Douglas MacArthur thought that the occupation of Leyte would be only a prelude to the major engagement on Luzon. For the Japanese, maintaining control of the Philippines was essential because their loss would enable the Allies to sever their oil supply lines from Borneo and Sumatra.

The Imperial Japanese Navy responded to this attack with a combined fleet attack that led to the Battle of Leyte Gulf from 23 to 26 October. In this massive naval engagement, the Japanese Navy was destroyed as a strategic force. However, this was not at first clear, and the Japanese commander in the Philippines, General Tomoyuki Yamashita, believed that the United States Navy had suffered severe casualties and that the Allied land forces might be vulnerable. Accordingly, he began to reinforce and resupply the garrisons on Leyte; over the course of the battle the Japanese ran nine convoys to the island, landing around 34,000 troops from the 1st, 8th, 26th, 30th, and 102nd divisions. Ormoc City at the head of Ormoc Bay on the west side of Leyte was the main port on the island and the main destination of the convoys.

Decryption of messages sent using the PURPLE cipher alerted the Allies to the concentration of Japanese shipping around Leyte, but they initially interpreted this as an evacuation. However, by the first week of November the picture was clear, and the Allies began to interdict the convoys.

== Operations ==
=== TA-3 and TA-4 (Japanese) ===
On 8–9 November, the Japanese dispatched two convoys from Manila to Ormoc Bay. The convoys were spaced one day apart so that the destroyers escorting the first convoy could double back and escort the second. However, the convoys were spotted on November 9 and attacked by land-based aircraft of the Fifth Air Force. On 10 November the 38th Bomb Group, based on Morotai, sent 32 B-25 Mitchells escorted by 37 P-47 Thunderbolts to attack TA-4 near Ponson Island. Reaching the convoy just before noon, the B-25s attacked at minimum altitude in pairs, sinking the two largest transports, the landing craft carrier Takatsu Maru and transport Kashii Maru, disabling a third, and sinking two of the patrol craft escorts at a cost of seven bombers, for which the group was awarded the Distinguished Unit Citation. But the Japanese transports had been able to put ashore the 10,000 soldiers they had been carrying, be it with only a fraction of the supplies.

On 11 November, U.S. 3rd Fleet commander Admiral William F. Halsey ordered an attack by 350 planes of Task Force 38 on the combined convoys.

Four destroyers – Shimakaze, Wakatsuki, Hamanami and Naganami – and four transports Mikasa Maru, Taizan Maru, Seiho Maru and Tensho Maru were sunk, with many of the 4,000 soldiers on board killed. Rear Admiral Mikio Hayakawa went down with Shimakaze, and some 1,000 sailors from the 8 ships were killed.

=== TA-5 (Japanese) ===
Convoy TA-5 left Manila on 23 November for Port Cataingan and Port Balancan. Of the six transports, five were sunk by air attack (T-111, T-141, T-160, T-6 and T-10) .

=== U.S. destroyer sweeps ===
Bad weather in late November made air interdiction less effective, and the U.S. Navy began to send destroyers into Ormoc Bay. Canigao Channel was swept for mines by the minesweepers Pursuit and Revenge, and the four destroyers of Destroyer Squadron 22 (DesRon 22) under the command of Captain Robert Smith (Waller, Pringle, Renshaw and Saufley) entered the bay on 27 November, where they shelled the docks at Ormoc City.

An Allied patrol plane radioed a message to the division noting that a surfaced Japanese submarine (I-46) was south of Pacijan Island and heading for Ormoc Bay. The division headed south to intercept; and, at 01:27 on 28 November, Waller's radar picked up the target just off the northeast coast of Ponson Island. Waller disabled I-46 with her first shots and, unable to submerge, she could only return fire with her deck guns until she sank at 01:45.

=== TA-6 (Japanese) ===
Two transports, Shinsho Maru and Shinetsu Maru, escorted by three patrol vessels, Subchasers Nos. 45 and 53 and Patrol Boat No. 105, left Manila on 27 November. They were attacked by American PT boats in Ormoc Bay on the night of 28 November and by air attack as the survivors left the area. All five ships were sunk, but not before they were able to unload most of their badly needed supplies to the troops on Leyte.

Another U.S. destroyer sweep on the night of 29–30 November in search of a reported convoy resulted only in the destruction of a few barges.

=== TA-7 (Japanese) ===
A convoy of three transports departed Manila on 1 December, escorted by destroyers Take and Kuwa under the command of Lieutenant Commander Masamichi Yamashita. Two groups of transport submarines also took part in the operation.

The convoy was docked at Ormoc City when it was engaged at 00:09 on 3 December by three ships of U.S. Destroyer Division 120 (DesDiv 120) under the command of Commander John C. Zahm (Allen M. Sumner, Cooper and Moale).

The U.S. ships sank the transports as they were unloading but came under heavy attack from Yokosuka P1Y "Frances" bombers, shore batteries, submarines that were known to be in the harbor, and the Japanese destroyers. Kuwa was sunk and Commander Yamashita was killed. Take attacked and stroke Cooper with torpedoes and escaped, though with some damage. Cooper sank at about 00:15 with the loss of 191 lives (168 sailors were rescued from the water on 4 December by Consolidated PBY Catalina flying boats). At 00:33, the two surviving U.S. destroyers were ordered to leave the bay, and the victorious Japanese successfully resupplied Ormoc Bay once more. This phase of the Battle of Ormoc Bay has gone down in history as the only naval engagement during the war in which the enemy brought to bear every type of weapon: naval gunnery, naval torpedoes, air attack, submarine attack, shore gunnery, and mines.

=== Ormoc Bay U.S. troop landings ===
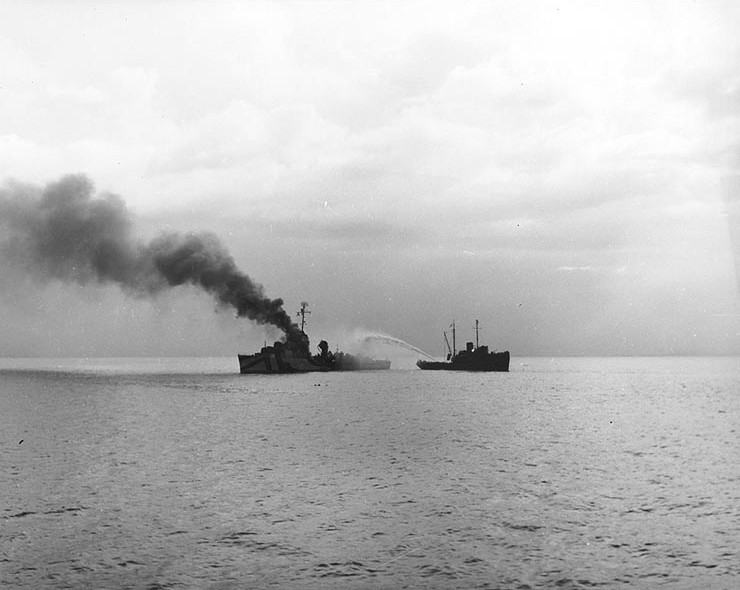
Lamson on fire in Ormoc Bay on 7 December 1944, after she was hit by a kamikaze. The tug assisting with firefighting is probably ATR-31.

On 7 December, the 77th Infantry Division, commanded by Major General Andrew D. Bruce, made an amphibious landing at Albuera, 3.5 mi (5.6 km) south of Ormoc City. The 77th Division's 305th, 306th, and 307th Infantry Regiments came ashore unopposed, but naval shipping was subjected to kamikaze attacks, resulting in the loss of destroyers Ward and Mahan.

=== TA-8 (Japanese) ===
This convoy carried 4,000 troops destined for Ormoc Bay, which were unloaded at San Isidro, 30 miles north of Ormoc, after receiving news of the U.S. troop landings near Ormoc. All five transports, Akagisan Maru, Hakuba Maru, Shinsei Maru No. 5, Nichiyo Maru and T-7 were sunk on 7 December by air attack, and the escorting destroyers Ume and Sugi were damaged. Some 350 sailors were killed.

=== TA-9 (Japanese) ===
Convoy TA-9 landed some 4,000 troops at Palompon, but escorting destroyers entered the bay on 11 December where two, Yūzuki (by air attacks) and Uzuki (by PT boats), were sunk and the third, Kiri, was damaged.

== Aftermath ==
By fighting this series of engagements in Ormoc Bay, the U.S. Navy was eventually able to prevent the Japanese from further resupplying and reinforcing their troops on Leyte, contributing significantly to the victory in the land battle. The final tally of ships lost in Ormoc Bay is: U.S. – three destroyers, one high speed transport, and two LSMs; Japan – six destroyers, 20 small transports, one submarine, one patrol boat and three escort vessels.

Historian Irwin J. Kappes argued that naval historians have unjustly neglected the importance of these engagements, writing:

"In the end, it was the rather amorphous Battle of Ormoc Bay that finally brought Leyte and the entire Gulf area under firm Allied control. From 11 November 1944 until 21 December, the combined efforts of Third Fleet carrier planes, Marine fighter-bomber groups, a pincer movement by the Army’s 77th Division and the First Division plus a motley assortment of destroyers, amphibious ships and PT boats trounced the now semi-isolated Japanese in a series of skirmishes and night raids. And because of poor weather conditions air support for most of these surface actions was almost non-existent."

Fires on the Plain is a renowned book by the Japanese writer Ooka Shohei which describes the final conditions of the Japanese army on the island of Leyte and the desperate flight of some of its isolated soldiers after their units have been defeated by US armed forces, as they try to reach Palompon on Leyte's West coast in the hope of re-embarking on Japanese vessels.
