= Port of Balanacan =

Port in the Philippines

Location
- Country: Philippines
- Location: Luzon island, the Philippines
- Coordinates: 13°32′01″N 121°51′55″E

Details
- Owned by: Philippine Ports Authority
- Type of harbour: Natural/Artificial

Statistics
- Website www.ppa.com.ph

Balanacan Port (Filipino: Pantalan ng Balanakan) is the major port in the island province of Marinduque, Philippines. It is located at the north-western tip of the province in Barangay Balanacan at the town of Mogpog, and is managed by the Philippine Ports Authority.

== Port Operation ==
The main shipping lines operating are Montenegro Shipping Lines and Starhorse Shipping Lines. Routes are mainly to and from Dalahican, Quezon.

== Expansion ==
In 2020, despite the COVID-19 pandemic in the Philippines, the PPA was set to complete Balinacan Port's expansion along with 17 other ports the agency operates.
