= Ormoc Bay =

Bay on island of Leyte in the Philippines

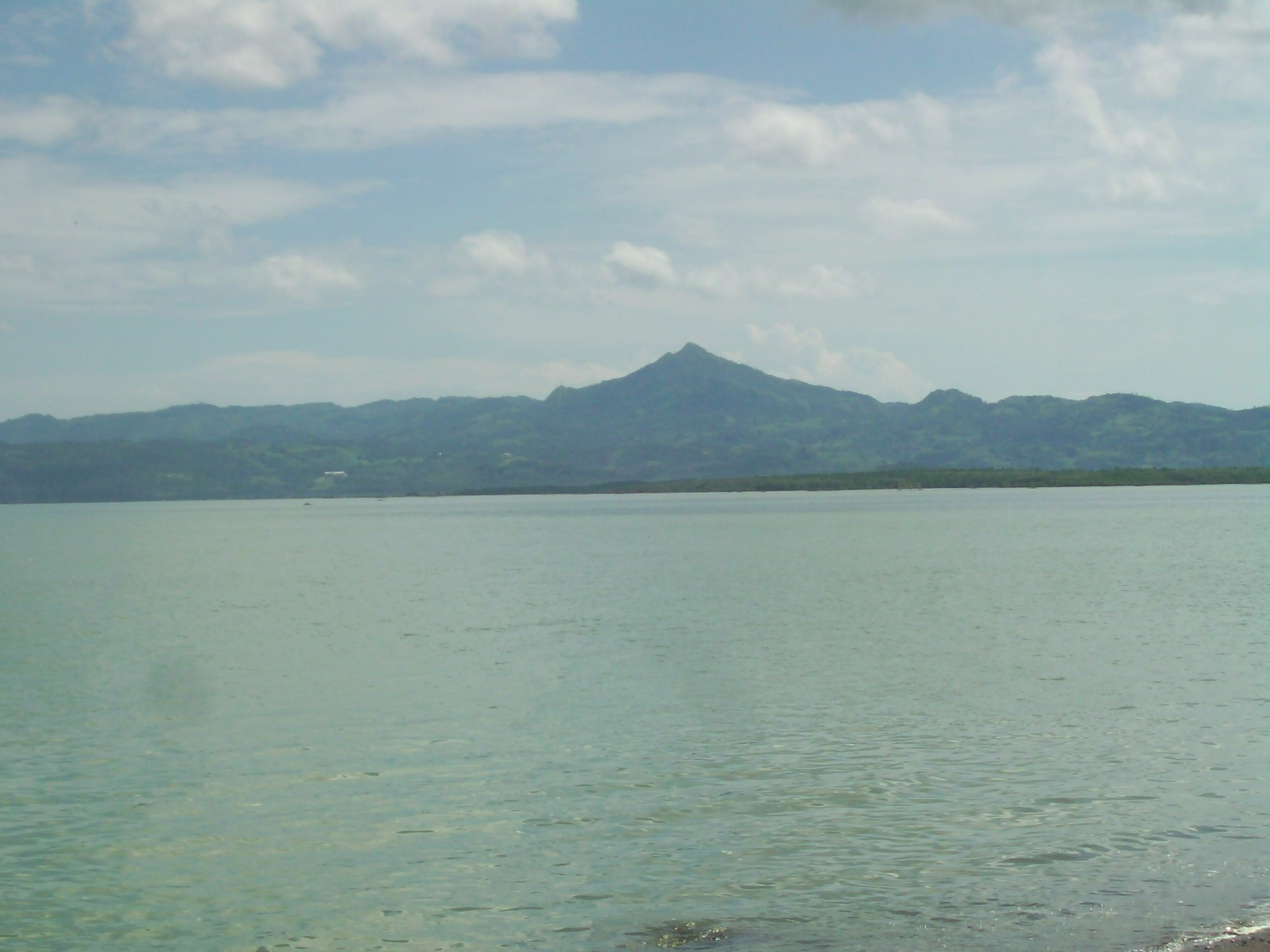
- The bay facing Merida, with the Magsanga mountain peak in the background

- Location within the Philippines Ormoc Bay (Philippines)
- Location: Leyte, Philippines
- Coordinates: 10°57′N 124°36′E
- Type: bay
- Part of: Camotes Sea
- Settlements: Albuera; Merida; Ormoc

Ormoc Bay is a large bay in the island of Leyte in the Philippines. The bay is an extension of the Camotes Sea. The city of Ormoc lies at the head of the bay and exports rice, copra and sugar.

The World War II Battle of Ormoc Bay took place from November 11 until mid-December in Ormoc Bay during late 1944. It consisted of a series of almost daily destroyer skirmishes and air battles. It was decisive in determining the outcome of the Battle of Leyte. The city of Ormoc was mostly destroyed during the battle and the current city is built on its ruins.
