= National Register of Historic Places listings in Lincoln County, Kansas =

Location of Lincoln County in Kansas

This is a list of the National Register of Historic Places listings in Lincoln County, Kansas.

This is intended to be a complete list of the properties on the National Register of Historic Places in Lincoln County, Kansas, United States. The locations of National Register properties for which the latitude and longitude coordinates are included below, may be seen in a map.

There are 17 properties listed on the National Register in the county.

This National Park Service list is complete through NPS recent listings posted September 26, 2025.

== Current listings ==
	Name on the Register	Image	Date listed	Location	City or town	Description
1	Archeological Site Number 14LC306		July 9, 1982 (#82004882)	Address restricted	Lincoln	
2	Behrhorst Brothers Hardware	Behrhorst Brothers Hardware	October 17, 2022 (#100008289)	105 North Main St. 39°00′40″N 98°23′36″W	Sylvan Grove	
3	Bullfoot Creek Bridge	Bullfoot Creek Bridge	July 2, 1985 (#85001421)	4 miles south and 0.9 miles east of Vesper; 38°58′25″N 98°15′39″W	Vesper	
4	Cummins Block Building	Cummins Block Building	March 24, 2000 (#00000268)	161 E. Lincoln; 39°02′24″N 98°08′47″W	Lincoln	
5	Danske Evangelist Lutheran Kirke	Danske Evangelist Lutheran Kirke	September 12, 1991 (#91001154)	Between Trail and Timber Creeks due east of Denmark; 39°05′22″N 98°16′42″W	Grant Township	Built c.1875-1880; bell tower and steeple added in 1901.
6	Evangelical Lutheran School	Evangelical Lutheran School	October 2, 2015 (#15000690)	308 N. Indiana St. 39°00′49″N 98°23′16″W	Sylvan Grove	
7	Frank & Anna Felcman Homestead	Frank & Anna Felcman Homestead	December 4, 2024 (#100011116)	264 N 60th Rd; 38°53′44″N 98°23′37″W	Sylvan Grove	
8	Lincoln Carnegie Library	Lincoln Carnegie Library	June 25, 1987 (#87000957)	203 S. 3rd 39°02′21″N 98°08′41″W	Lincoln	
9	Lincoln City Park	Lincoln City Park	March 26, 2020 (#100005124)	500-700 blocks of East Lincoln Ave. 39°02′25″N 98°08′18″W	Lincoln	
10	Lincoln County Courthouse	Lincoln County Courthouse	July 13, 1976 (#76000825)	3rd and Lincoln Ave. 39°02′27″N 98°08′41″W	Lincoln	
11	Lincoln Downtown Historic District	Lincoln Downtown Historic District	June 1, 2020 (#100005123)	Roughly bounded by East and West Lincoln Ave., Elm St., Court St., West Court and South 5th St. 39°02′25″N 98°09′02″W	Lincoln	
12	Lincoln High School	Lincoln High School	February 3, 2020 (#100004204)	700 S. 4th St. 39°02′02″N 98°08′52″W	Lincoln	
13	Marshall-Yohe House	Marshall-Yohe House	April 19, 2001 (#01000386)	316 S. 2nd St. 39°02′15″N 98°08′41″W	Lincoln	
14	Nielsen Farm	Nielsen Farm	January 11, 2006 (#05001513)	1125 E. Pike Dr. 39°05′02″N 98°17′37″W	Sylvan Grove	
15	Salt Creek Truss Leg Bedstead Bridge	Salt Creek Truss Leg Bedstead Bridge	May 9, 2003 (#03000368)	B Rd., 0.6 mile east of its intersection with 24th Rd., 1.0 mile north of Barnard; 39°12′17″N 98°02′57″W	Barnard	
16	Spring Creek Tributary Bridge	Spring Creek Tributary Bridge	July 2, 1985 (#85001440)	8 miles south and 5 miles west of Lincoln; 38°54′32″N 98°14′38″W	Lincoln	
17	Sylvan Grove Union Pacific Depot	Sylvan Grove Union Pacific Depot	April 2, 2014 (#14000118)	131 S. Main St. 39°00′34″N 98°23′34″W	Sylvan Grove	Part of the Railroad Resources of Kansas MPS

== See also ==
- List of National Historic Landmarks in Kansas
- National Register of Historic Places listings in Kansas
