= Khan Shaykhun chemical attack =

2017 chemical attack in Syria

2017 Khan Shaykhun chemical attack
- Part of the Syrian Civil War
- Type: Airstrike, sarin attack
- Location: Khan Shaykhun, Idlib Governorate, Syria; 35°26′20″N 36°39′4″E
- Date: 4 April 2017; 9 years ago 06:30 EEST (UTC+03:00)
- Executed by: Syrian Air Force
- Outcome: US launches retaliatory missile strike
- Casualties: 89–100+ killed 300–541 injured
- Location of Khan Shaykhun within Syria

The Khan Shaykhun chemical attack took place on 4 April 2017 on the town of Khan Shaykhun in the Idlib Governorate of Syria. The town was reported to have been struck by an airstrike by government forces followed by massive civilian chemical poisoning. The release of a toxic gas, which included sarin, or a similar substance, killed at least 89 people and injured more than 541, according to the opposition Idlib Health Directorate. The attack was the deadliest use of chemical weapons in the Syrian civil war since the Ghouta chemical attack in 2013.

The OPCW-UN Joint Investigative Mechanism attributed the responsibility of the attack to the Syrian government. The OPCW-UN JIM described chemicals that it said linked the sarin used to the Syrian government: "The samples from Khan Shaykhun contain the three types of marker chemicals described above: PF6 [HFP], isopropyl phosphates and isopropyl phosphorofluoridates. Their presence is a strong indicator that the sarin disseminated in Khan Shaykhun was produced from DF from the Syrian Arab Republic stockpile."

The governments of the United States, United Kingdom, Turkey, Saudi Arabia, France, and Israel as well as Human Rights Watch attributed the attack to the forces of Syrian President Bashar al-Assad. The Syrian government said the attack was a "fabrication" while the Russian government said that the incident was staged.

On 7 April, the United States launched 59 cruise missiles at Shayrat Air Base, which U.S. intelligence cited as the source of the attack.

== Background ==
Use of chemical weapons in the Syrian Civil War has been confirmed by the local sources in Syria and by the United Nations. Deadly attacks by chemical weapons during the war include the Ghouta attack in the suburbs of Damascus in August 2013 and the Khan al-Assal attack in the suburbs of Aleppo in March 2013. While no party took responsibility for the chemical attacks, a U.N. fact-finding mission and a UNHRC Commission of Inquiry have both investigated the attacks.

The U.N. mission found likely use of the nerve agent sarin in the case of Khan al-Asal (19 March 2013), Saraqib (29 April 2013), Ghouta (21 August 2013), Jobar (24 August 2013) and Ashrafiyat Sahnaya (25 August 2013). The UNHRC commission later confirmed the use of sarin in the Khan al-Asal, Saraqib and Ghouta attacks, but did not mention the Jobar and the Ashrafiyat Sahnaya attacks. The UNHRC commission also found the sarin used in the Khan al-Asal attack bore "the same unique hallmarks" as the sarin used in the Ghouta attack and indicated the perpetrators likely had access to chemicals from the Syrian Army's stockpile. Those attacks prompted the international community to pressure disarmament of the Syrian Armed Forces from chemical weapons, which was executed during 2014. Despite the disarmament process, dozens of incidents with suspected use of chemical weapons followed throughout Syria, the majority being attributed to anti-government fighters, in particular the Al Qaeda affiliate Al Nusra Front.

In August and October 2016, United Nations reports explicitly blamed the Syrian military of Bashar al-Assad for dropping chlorine bombs on the towns of Talmenes on 21 April 2014, Sarmin on 16 March 2015. and Qmenas, also on 16 March 2015. Several other attacks have been alleged, reported and/or investigated. In December 2016, at least 53 people were killed in an alleged chemical weapons attack in ISIL-held villages near Uqairabat that bore similarities to the Ghouta attack, with none of the dead having blast injuries.

The immediate context for the Khan Shaykhun attack was the intensified aerial campaign in March and April 2017 by the government and its Russian ally to gain control of Kafr Zeita, Murek and al-Lataminah, then the three remaining rebel-held towns in the northern Hama Governorate. (See Hama offensive (March–April 2017).) On 30 March 2017, an airstrike hit al-Lataminah, around 15 kilometers (9 miles) from Khan Shaykhun. More than 70 people in the area were then exposed to an unidentified chemical agent and showed symptoms of nausea, agitation, foaming, muscle spasm, and miosis (constriction of the pupil of the eye). Cardiac arrest occurred in two of the victims and an orthopedic doctor died. On 3 April 2017, one day before the Khan Shaykhun attack, a "regime aircraft" allegedly carried out a similar chlorine gas attack on Al-Habit, a nearby village, injuring dozens and killing two children.

== Attack ==
Map showing frontlines at the time of the attack, with the location of the strike marked by the hatched circle

The attack took place around 6:30 a.m. local time on 4 April, before most children and parents had left for school or work. Witnesses reported smelling a strange odor about ten minutes after a rocket attack and airstrike, followed by visible symptoms of poisoning. White Helmets volunteers reported four unusually weak explosions. Victims were treated at al-Rahma hospital in Idlib. Medical workers and witnesses said the attack was different than the chlorine gas attacks they had experienced in the past, in which the chlorine gas usually killed a few people in confined spaces and buildings. In contrast, in this attack, many people died outside. Furthermore, the victims exhibited pinpoint pupils, a sign of contact with nerve agents and sarin specifically. Other symptoms reported included coldness in the extremities, decreased heart rate, and low blood pressure, convulsions, foaming at the mouth or vomit, and respiratory paralysis. Some first responders became ill when they came into contact with the victims.

Rescue workers gathered soil and tissue samples and sent them to Western intelligence officials for analysis. On 6 April, the Turkish Ministry of Health, which had conducted tests on people transported to Turkey, said it had identified the chemical used in the attack as sarin, citing lung damage found in victims. On 11 April, Turkish Minister of Health Recep Akdağ stated that isopropyl methylphosphonic acid—a known byproduct of sarin reacting with other compounds—was "identified in the blood and urine tests conducted on samples taken from the victims". Tests by British scientists of samples found at the scene indicated the chemical involved was "sarin or a sarin-like substance".

The Guardian's Kareem Shaheen, the first reporter from western media to visit the town after the attack, photographed the crater where the chemical weapon was reported to have hit an apparently abandoned warehouse and silos near the crater.

=== Casualties ===
Medical sources in Idlib in the immediate aftermath of the attack reported more than 58 people, including 11 children, were killed and over 300 were wounded. Test results of samples collected from ten of them indicated they had been exposed to sarin or a sarin-like substance.

By 7:30 a.m. EEST 100 wounded people arrived at a local field hospital. The opposition minister of health, Mohamad Firas al-Jundi, said victims experienced suffocation, fluid in the lungs, foaming at the mouth, unconsciousness, spasm, and paralysis. A few hours after the attack, a nearby clinic treating victims was hit by an airstrike, with reports that Russians bombed the hospital with the victims in an attempt to destroy the evidence. The area's largest hospital was bombed two days prior. According to Dr. Abdel Hay Tennari, who treated 22 victims of the attack, the symptoms of victims corresponded to symptoms of exposure to sarin. Patients who received pralidoxime, an antidote of sarin, reportedly stabilized their medical state in around an hour. Médecins Sans Frontières visited Bab Al Hawa hospital where they determined symptoms consistent with sarin. They also visited other hospitals where victims were taken and reported, "that victims smelled of bleach, suggesting they had been exposed to chlorine." They concluded that the "reports strongly suggest that victims of the attack on Khan Sheikhoun were exposed to at least two different chemical agents."

On 5 April, local doctors and rescue workers at the scene said the number of dead had risen to 74, with 600 injured, and later that day The Daily Telegraph reported 86 deaths, including 30 children, and noted the death toll was rising as so many had died in their homes and only taken to hospitals later. Turkish President Recep Tayyip Erdoğan and French Ambassador to the United Nations François Delattre said over 100 had died. On 7 April, the opposition Idlib Health Directorate said 89 had died, 18 women and 33 children. On 9 May 2017, a report from CNN said the attack killed 92 people in all.

== Responsibility ==
On 6 September 2017, the UN Office of the High Commissioner for Human Rights' Independent International Commission of Inquiry on the Syrian Arab Republic concluded that a Syrian Air Force aircraft was responsible the sarin attack, saying "the Syrian air force used sarin in Khan Sheikhoun, Idlib, killing dozens, the majority of whom were women and children". It dismissed the Syrian and Russian claim that a bomb struck an opposition chemical weapons depot on the outskirts of the northern town as “fabricated”. The report found that a Sukhoi 22 jet, which is only flown by the Syrian airforce, had carried out four airstrikes at 6.45am on 4 April. Three bombs carried conventional explosives, but one, which struck a road, carried the deadly nerve agent, which was carried as far as 600 metres away on a gentle wind. “Weather conditions at 6.45am on 4 April were ideal for delivering a chemical weapon,” the report said. “The wind speed was just over 3km/h, with no rain and practically no cloud cover. Under such conditions, the agent cloud would have drifted slowly downhill following the terrain features at the location.”

The Assad government has repeatedly denied using chemical weapons, but the report said the Syrian government's version of events, that an unknown weapons depot had been hit, was “extremely unlikely”. It said sarin stored in such circumstances would have mostly burned off or been absorbed by rubble, and that there was no evidence of the building being contaminated.

A visit by The Guardian to Khan Sheikhun two days after the attack revealed that the site officials claimed had been hit had been empty for many months, and contained only animal feed and a volleyball net. Witnesses described the frantic aftermath of a series of airstrikes, which overwhelmed the limited capacity of local medics and rescue workers. This finding was confirmed in a report released on 26 October 2017 by the OPCW-UN Joint Investigative Mechanism.

Many governments, such as the United States and some European countries and the Gulf Cooperation Council attributed the attack to the Syrian government. According to investigation by Human Rights Watch, the attack was conducted by Syrian government forces from the air using Soviet-made KhAB-250 aerial bombs designed to deliver sarin. The investigative journalism website Bellingcat suggested Russia may have inadvertently provided evidence of the Syrian government's use of the M4000 chemical bomb. The Syrian government denied any involvement. Immediately following the attacks, Russia said the Syrian Air Force had struck Khan Shaykhun "between 11:30am and 12:30pm local time" on 4 April, but that the target had been "a large terrorist ammunition depot" on its eastern outskirts. "On the territory of the depot, there were workshops which produced chemical warfare munitions", and following the OPCW conclusions, in October 2017, it strongly disputed the conclusion that the Syrian government was responsible. The UN Security Council session unanimously declared the need for an investigation of the chemical attack. According to an OPCW report, an investigation into the attack was concluded and released on 29 June 2017, which confirmed the use of sarin gas, or a similar substance.

The United Kingdom’s assessment is that it is almost certain that the Syrian Government was responsible for a sarin attack on Khan Shaykhun on 4 April. (...) There is no evidence to suggest that any party to the conflict in Syria, other than the Syrian Government, has access to a complex nerve agent such as sarin. We note that the FFM’s report refers to testimony from witnesses describing the presence of jets in the area at the time of the attack. Only the Syrian Air Force has the capability to launch a chemical weapons attack from aircraft, and it has already been condemned by this Council for having been found to have used chemical weapons, deployed from aircraft, on at least three occasions in 2014 and 2015.

— Sir Geoffrey Adams, UK Permanent Representative to the OPCW,

In May 2026, an OPCW expert team, supported by the Syrian authorities, discovered significant quantities of undeclared chemical weapons, including rockets and aerial bombs, at high-interest sites in northern coastal and central Syria, including aerial bombs of the same type as those used in the Khan Shaykhun attack.

== Claims by the Syrian government, Syrian opposition and Russian government ==
=== Syrian opposition claims ===
According to the Idlib Media Centre, the chemical agent had the characteristics of sarin. The National Coalition for Syrian Revolutionary and Opposition Forces accused the Syrian government and the Syrian Armed Forces of carrying out the attack and called for an immediate investigation by the United Nations Security Council. The opposition groups said the Syrian air force dropped chemical bombs on a civilian population.

=== Syrian government claims ===
On the day of the attack, a Syrian government official told Reuters "the government does not and has not used chemical weapons, not in the past and not in the future." Later, the Russian Ministry of Defence reiterated the statement made by the Syrian Armed Forces, and said the attack on the ammunition depot took place between 11:30 and 12:30 EEST.

In a 13 April interview to AFP, President Assad said the attack is "100 per cent fabrication" by the United States "working hand-in-glove with the terrorists", intended to provide a pretext for the airstrike on the Shayrat Airbase.

=== Russian government claims ===
The Russian government denied involvement in the chemical attack; Russia's Defence Ministry issued a statement saying the Russian Air Force had "not carried out any strikes near Khan Shaykhun of Idlib province", but said a Syrian aircraft did conduct an airstrike on a warehouse containing ammunition and equipment belonging to rebels near Khan Shaykhun, "yesterday, from 11:30 a.m. to 12:30 p.m". The Russian Foreign Ministry said it was "premature to accuse the Syrian government of using chemical weapons in Idlib", and insist on full and impartial investigation. Shortly after the attack Russian presidential spokesman Dmitry Peskov told reporters the use of chemical weapons is a "dangerous and monstrous crime" and that Russia's support for Assad is not "unconditional". He also said he doubted information was based on "objective materials or evidence", and that only Syrian government can resist "terrorists on the ground." Mikhail Ulyanov, head of the Russian delegation to UNGA First Committee and Director of the Department for Non-Proliferation and Arms Control of the MFA of Russia, stated on the sidelines of the 72nd session of the UN General Assembly that Russia tended to 'more and more to opt for that version' that explained the event as a staged incident, and to doubt that it was the result of an air bomb strike.

Later, President Vladimir Putin said the attack could be a provocation, but that several versions were possible, and the UN should investigate the attack. On 11 April, Putin suggested the chemical attack was a false flag operation intended to discredit the Syrian government.

UK based Bellingcat founder Eliot Higgins observed that Russian claims that a warehouse containing chemical weapons was bombed related to a raid carried out "two to three hours" after the first images of victims appeared. A statement made on the day of the attack by Major General Igor Konashenkov, a spokesperson for the Russian Ministry of Defence was also criticised by Higgins' Bellingcat colleague Dan Kaszeta, a veteran of the US Army Reserve's Chemical Corps, who called it "an infantile argument", and by the anti-Kremlin Russian non-profit Conflict Intelligence Team.

== United States reaction ==
=== Responsibility assessment ===
According to the US government, the Syrian government under Assad was behind the chemical attack, and Syrian jets carried out the bombing of a rebel stronghold. US Secretary of State Rex Tillerson was quoted as saying "Either Russia has been complicit or Russia has been simply incompetent". According to Tillerson, the US appealed to Assad to cease the use of chemical weapons, and "[o]ther than that, there is no change to our military posture", with ISIS remaining the primary priority.

President Donald Trump called the attack "reprehensible" and attributed it to the Syrian government, saying the act could not be ignored "by the civilized world" during his meeting with King Abdullah II of Jordan. Trump also blamed the attack on supposed failures of the administration of his predecessor, Barack Obama. Tillerson said: "Anyone who uses chemical weapons to attack his own people shows a fundamental disregard for human decency and must be held accountable." US representative to the UN Nikki Haley has stated that, though before the chemical attack the US had not considered overthrowing Syrian President Bashar al-Assad from power a top US priority, it is now prominent among US priorities in the region. At the UN Security Council, Haley said "When the United Nations consistently fails in its duty to act collectively, there are times in the life of states that we are compelled to take our own action", by it implying if the UN failed to hold Assad accountable for the use of chemical weapons on civilians, the US will. CIA Director Mike Pompeo confirmed on Thursday 13 April that his agency concluded the Syrian government was responsible for the chemical attack in Khan Shaykhun. “We were good and fast,” Pompeo said. The top Democrat on the house intelligence committee, Rep. Adam Schiff, agreed that the Syrian government was responsible for the attack.

A few members of Congress and former officials expressed skepticism, like Democratic Congresswoman Tulsi Gabbard, Republican Congressman Thomas Massie, and former Republican Congressman Ron Paul.

=== Missile strike ===
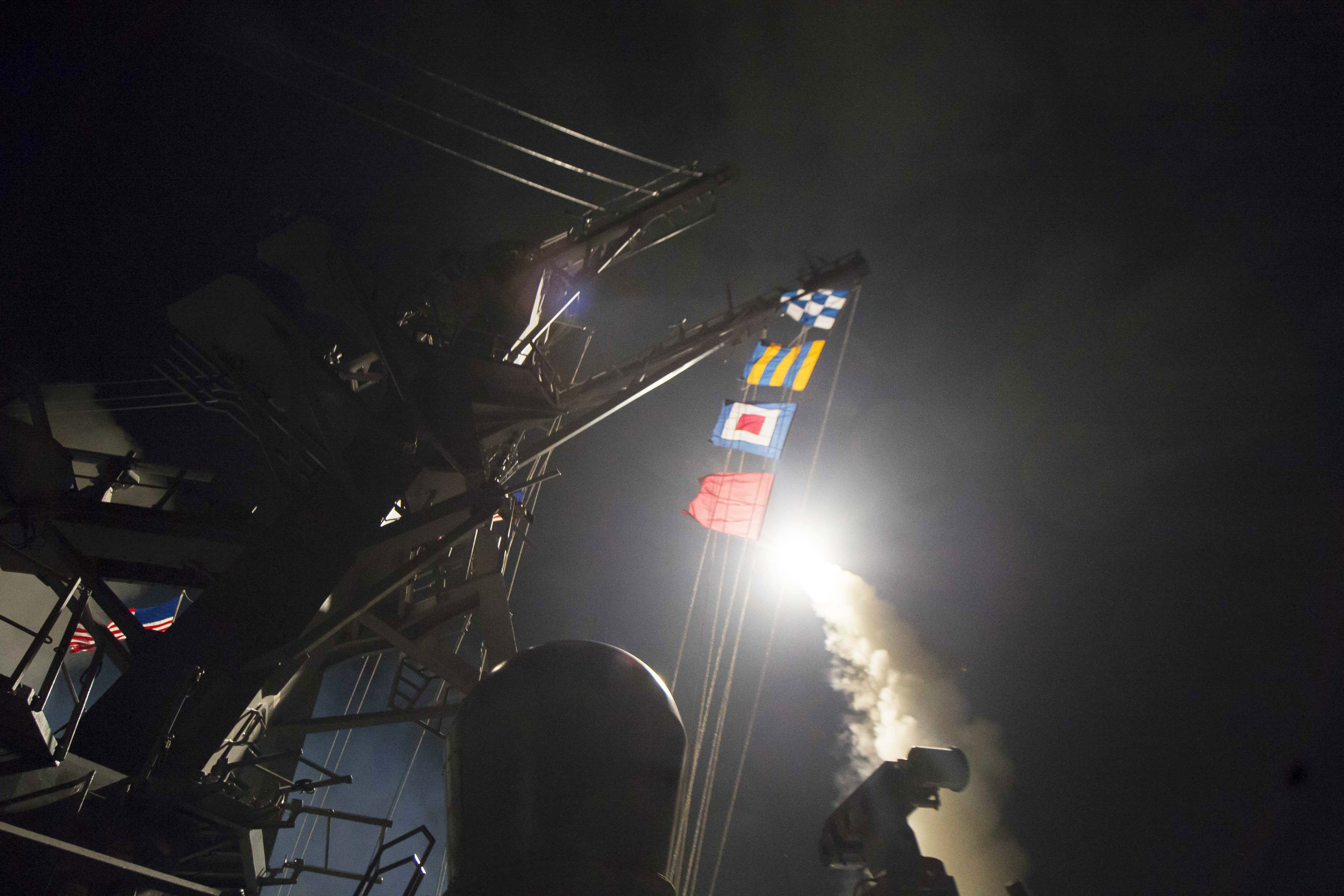
USS Ross firing a Tomahawk missile towards the Shayrat Airbase

On the morning of 7 April 2017, 72 hours after the attack, the United States launched 59 cruise missiles on Shayrat Airbase, a Syrian airfield near Shayrat, believed to be the base for the aircraft that carried out the chemical attack. In contrast to the coalition's accidental air raid on Deir ez-Zor in 2016, this was both a unilateral action and the first intentional strike against the Syrian government.

=== Sanctions ===
On 24 April 2017, the United States Department of the Treasury imposed sanctions on 271 employees of the Syrian Scientific Studies and Research Center for their alleged role in producing chemical weapons.

== International reactions ==
=== Supranational and non-governmental organizations ===
Secretary-General António Guterres said he was "deeply disturbed" by reports of the Idlib chemical attack, noting that the use of chemical weapons is banned under international law. Federica Mogherini, the European Union's diplomatic chief, called the attack "awful" and said Bashar al-Assad's government bore "primary responsibility" for it.

The Organisation for the Prohibition of Chemical Weapons (OPCW) expressed "serious concern" and said its Fact-Finding Mission in Syria was "gathering and analysing information from all available sources." The following day, the Technical Secretariat of the OPCW, referring to the media reports, requested all member states of the Chemical Weapons Convention to share available information on what it described preliminary as "allegations of use of chemical weapons in the Khan Shaykhun area of Idlib province in the Syrian Arab Republic." Amnesty International said the evidence points to an "air-launched chemical attack", while the World Health Organization said victims carried the signs of exposure to nerve agents. On 26 October, an investigative panel created by the UN Security Council said it was "confident" that Assad's air force was behind the chemical attack. Further, that the attack was possible because it drew from old Syrian stockpiles that Assad had vowed to destroy in 2013, indicating that Damascus has systematically cheated international inspectors for the past four years.

=== UN Security Council countries ===
France called for an emergency meeting of the United Nations Security Council after the attack. France, Britain, and the United States (who are among the permanent members of the Security Council), circulated a draft to the council's 15 members condemning the attack in Syria and demanding a full investigation into it. The emergency closed-door meeting was set on 5 April in New York. United States Ambassador to the United Nations Nikki Haley, serving as president of the Security Council for the month, announced there would not be a vote on a draft resolution to respond to the chemical weapons attack, but instead of one resolution by the U.S. and a second resolution by Russia, there was a third resolution unexpectedly submitted by Sweden and nine other non-permanent members. When the council concluded its meeting without conclusion on the morning of 6 April, the U.S. launched a missile strike. On 12 April, the proposed draft resolution was vetoed by Russia as it attributed blame to the Syrian government before any investigation had been undertaken. This was the eighth time that Russia vetoed a Security Council resolution on Syria. Instead, on 20 April, Russia and Iran formally proposed to start an OPCW investigation (which was rejected as an investigation is already in progress) and then on 26 April blocked UN resolution calling Syria to disclose information for the first OPCW investigation at the same accusing UN of "blocking independent international investigation" earlier proposed by Russia and Iran.

On 26 April 2017, French Foreign Minister Jean-Marc Ayrault said France had concluded that the Syrian government was "unquestionably" the perpetrator of the attack. He added that the same mixture of sarin and hexamine had been used in the 2013 Saraqib chemical attack.

United Kingdom government defense minister, Michael Fallon said he believed the Syrian air force responsible for the attack. Opposition leader Jeremy Corbyn said "There should now be an immediate ceasefire and a UN-led investigation rapidly into what is a horrific and totally illegal action by somebody using chemical weapons against innocent people."

The Egyptian Foreign Ministry released a statement saying the "painful and unacceptable" images of the massacre reaffirm the necessity of reaching a political solution to end the crisis in Syria, in light of the international community decisions and Security Council Resolution 2254, as well as the Geneva Conventions.

=== Other countries ===
Iranian President Hassan Rouhani called for an "impartial international fact-finding body" to be set up to investigate the attack. Foreign minister Mohammad Javad Zarif described the incident as "very painful" and condemned it, but also criticized US for attacking the Syrian airbase "without doing investigation". Iranian Foreign ministry spokesman Bahram Ghassemi condemned "all use of chemical weapons," but suggested the blame for the attack lay with "terrorist groups" rather than the Syrian government.

Canadian Prime Minister Justin Trudeau said: "There are continuing questions ... about who is responsible for these horrible attacks against civilians, and that's why I'm impressing on the UN Security Council to pass a strong resolution that allows the international community to determine first of all who was responsible for these attacks and how we will move forward." Israeli Prime Minister Benjamin Netanyahu called on the international community "to fulfill its obligation from 2013 to fully and finally remove these horrible weapons from Syria". Other countries who condemned the chemical attack include the Czech Republic, Italy, Pakistan, Saudi Arabia, Switzerland, United Kingdom, and the Vatican City.

The Iraqi government condemned the chemical attack and called for an "initiative aimed at punishing those responsible". The next day, Iraqi cleric Muqtada al-Sadr also condemned the attacks and called for President Assad to step down. Australian Prime Minister Malcolm Turnbull said if al-Assad was found to be behind the attack, as the United States believe, it represented "a shocking war crime." Other countries who accused Assad for responsibility include Qatar and Turkey.

== Other views ==
Former head of the International Atomic Energy Agency (IAEA), Hans Blix, described the US retaliation as "measured" and specific, but later criticized the rapid American military response. He initially raised concern that the responsibility of the Syrian government was not yet proven, but stated on 11 April 2017, "On balance it seems probable that the attack with gas was undertaken by the Syrian government air force," adding that "the factual circumstances known so far do not point to the rebels as arranging the gas action".

Other people who have expressed skepticism of the Syrian government being responsible for the attack include former UN weapons inspector Scott Ritter, US based weapons expert and MIT professor emeritus Theodore Postol, former UK ambassador to Syria and director of the British Syrian Society Peter Ford, investigative Israeli journalist Uri Avneri, and investigative journalist Seymour Hersh. The OPCW-UN JIM report found no merit in any of these views and concluded that the sarin used in the attack bore the Syrian government's signature; "the Leadership Panel is confident that the Syrian Arab Republic is responsible for the release of sarin at Khan Shaykhun on 4 April 2017".

In 2019, the Princeton University-linked journal Science & Global Security, on whose editorial board Ted Postol sat, intended to publish a paper titled "Computational Forensic Analysis for the Chemical Weapons Attack at Khan Sheikhoun on 4 April 2017" written by Goong Chen, Cong Gu, Postol, Alexey Sergeev, Sanyang Liu, Pengfei Yao and Marlan O. Scully. The article questioned the findings of the UN/OPCW investigation which concluded that the Syrian government had used sarin. The report's arguments were rebutted in a Bellingcat article that detailed inconsistencies and anomalies in the report's analysis. In response to the Bellingcat article, the editors of Science & Global Security said "Regrettably, the Bellingcat group blog post contains a number of incorrect statements about the contents and conclusions of the paper to be published. Some of the statements appear to refer to an earlier manuscript and do not take account of all the changes made during the peer review and editorial process managed by this journal." The journal later decided not to publish the paper.

== See also ==
- List of massacres during the Syrian Civil War
- Syria and weapons of mass destruction
- Use of chemical weapons in the Syrian Civil War
