= Shayrat Airbase =

Shayrat Airbase قاعدة الشعيرات الجوية
- IATA: none; ICAO: none; FAA LID: OS65

Summary
- Airport type: Military
- Owner: Syrian Armed Forces
- Operator: Syrian Air Force
- Location: Shayrat, Homs Governorate
- In use: Unknown–present
- Coordinates: 34°29′24″N 36°54′32″E

Map
- Location in Syria

Runways
Direction	Length		Surface
Direction	ft	m	Surface
11/29	9,850	3,002.28	Surface paved, not lighted
15/33	10,498.69	3,200	Asphalt

Shayrat Airbase (FAA LID: OS65) is home to the Syrian Air Force 50th Air Brigade located in Homs. It has two runways and around 40 hardened aircraft shelters.

== Squadrons ==
The brigade consists of three fighter squadrons:

- 675th Fighter Squadron (MIG-23s)
- 677th Fighter Squadron (SU-22s)
- 685th Fighter Squadron (SU-22s)

According to the Trump administration, the base is also believed to contain a chemical weapons storage depot.

== History ==
The airbase was originally constructed in the 1960s.

The Russian Air Force also uses the facility. In 2015, Russia expanded the runways in order to accommodate Russian aircraft. In February 2016, the Russian military doubled the number of attack helicopters stationed at Shayrat. Jane's reports that there were "four Russian Mi-35 helicopters, four Mi-24s, and one Mi-8/17." This deployment was in addition to a previous deployment of four Mi-24s in November 2015. In addition to Air Force assets, "Russia's 120th Artillery Brigade with six 152 mm 2A65 Msta-B towed howitzers had taken up position at a Syrian Arab Army (SAA) base just to the south of the airbase."

According to Defense & Foreign Affairs Strategic Policy, the Russian Air Force "use[d] the al-Shayrat Air Base as a transit hub and an entry point for military supplies for the Syrian military, thus reducing the congestion in Khmeimim," as well as operating forward refueling and rearming services for Russian aircraft supporting the Syrian Army. The journal also reported that the Iranian Air Force also extensively utilize the facilities.

=== 2017 U.S. Navy missile strike ===
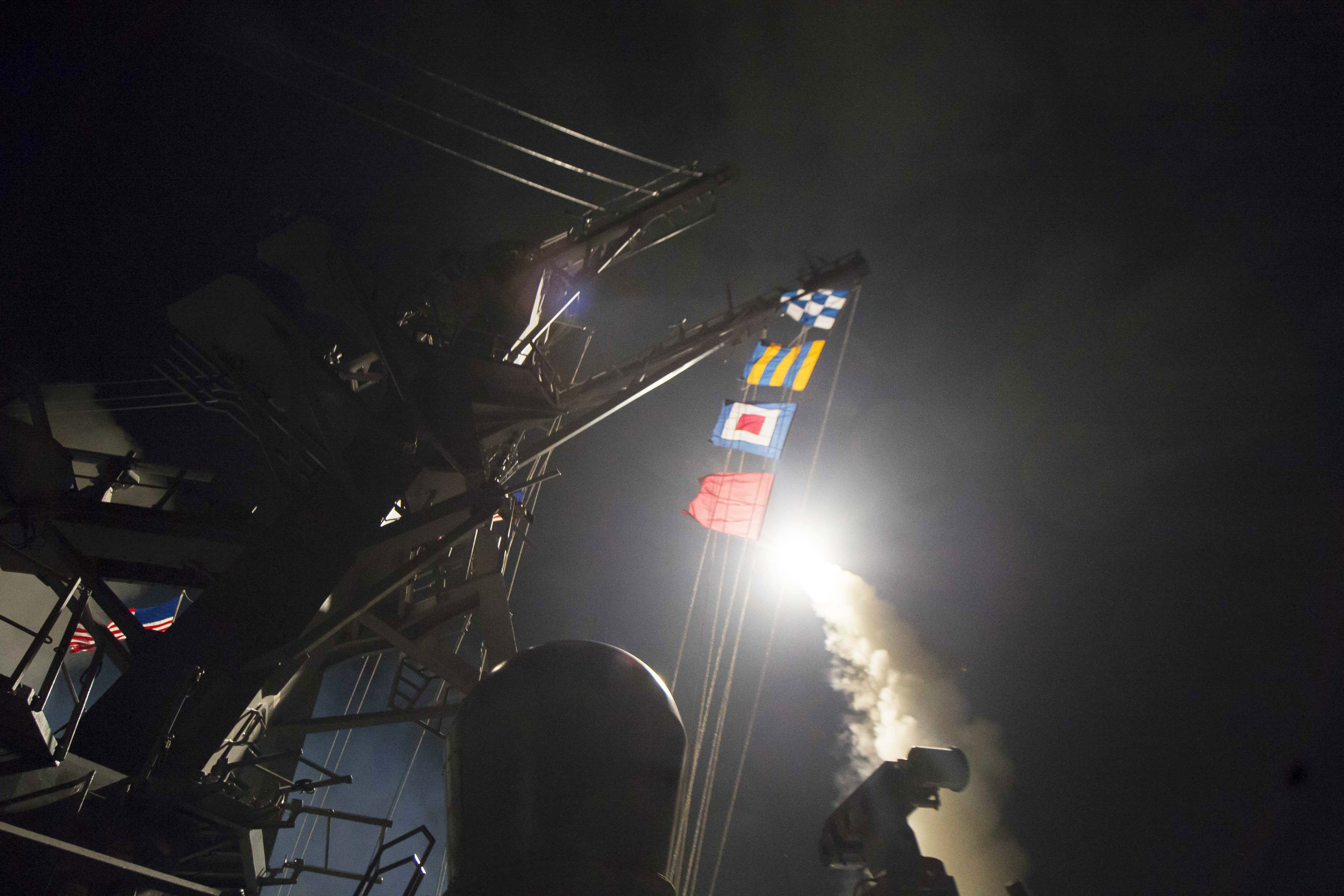
USS Ross firing a Tomahawk missile towards the base, April 2017

On 7 April 2017, on the orders from U.S. President Donald Trump, USS Ross and USS Porter (both based in the Mediterranean) fired 60 Tomahawk missiles at Shayrat airfield, with 59 reaching the base, according to the CBS Evening News, in response to a suspected chemical attack in the town of Khan Shaykhun in the Idlib Province. The attack on Khan Sheikhoun is believed to have been launched from Shayrat. The United States had reportedly notified Russia, Syria's biggest ally, prior to the strike.

=== 2022 Israeli airstrike ===
On 13 November 2022, Israeli warplanes flew through Lebanese airspace and conducted an airstrike on the Shayrat Airbase, inflicting casualties and damage. Syrian state media reported that the strikes killed two Syrian soldiers and wounded three.

=== 2024 Israeli airstrike ===
Following the Fall of Damascus, Israel launched its invasion of Syria on 8 December 2024 and conducted nearly 300 air raids on the country within 48 hours. According to the British-based Syrian Observatory for Human Rights, the Israeli air force targeted military sites across the country overnight, launching attacks on Shayrat airbase, and significantly weakening the Syrian Air Force.
