= 2017 Shayrat missile strike =

United States missile strike in Syria on 7 April 2017

- Part of the Syrian civil war the US intervention in the Syrian civil war and US strikes on Ba'athist Syria
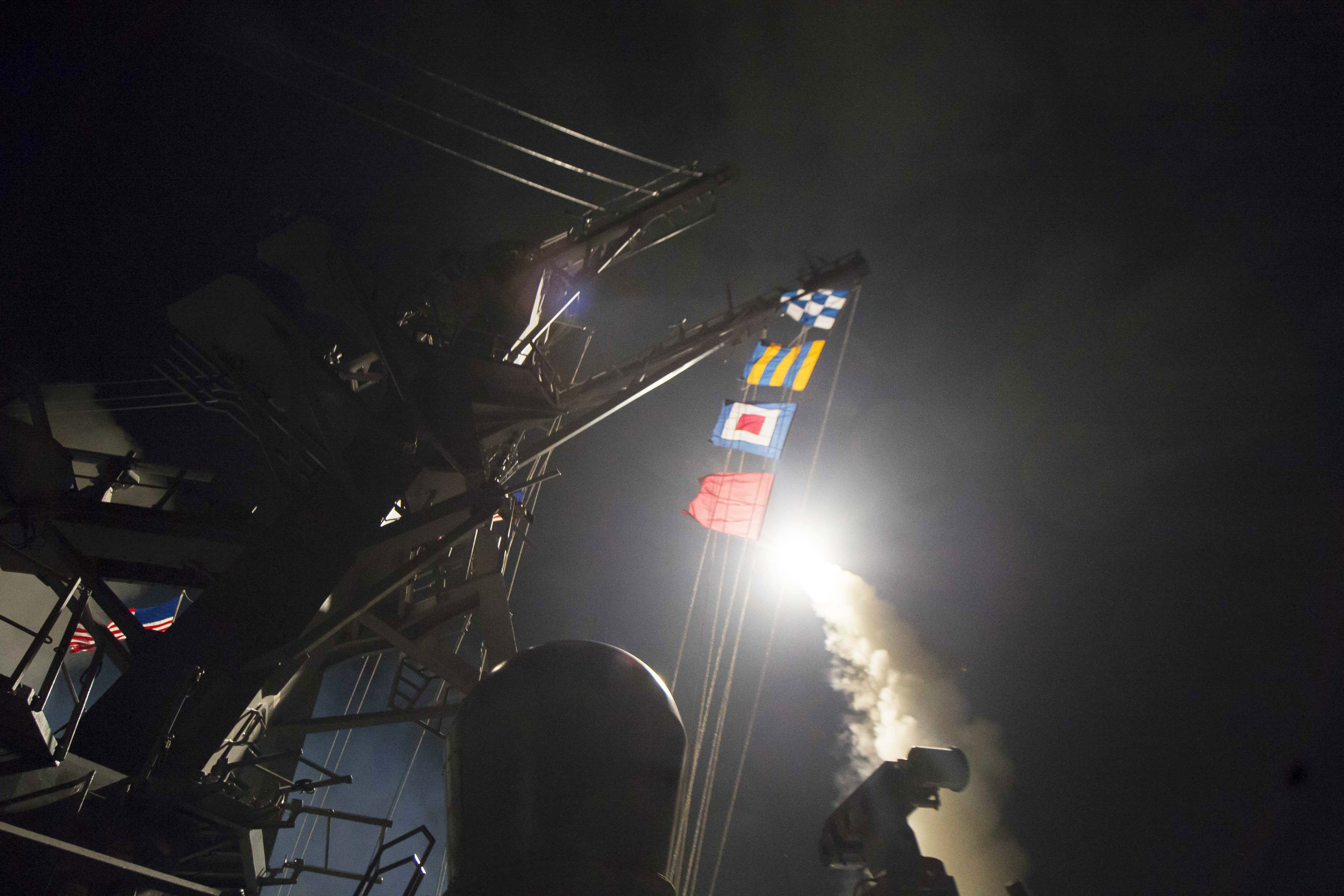
- USS Ross fires a Tomahawk missile towards Shayrat Airbase
- Operational scope: Single-site targeted military strike
- Type: Tomahawk missile strike
- Location: Shayrat Airbase, Shayrat, Syria; 34°29′39″N 36°54′40″E
- Planned by: United States
- Commanded by: Donald Trump; Jim Mattis
- Target: Shayrat Airbase
- Objective: Destroy air defenses, aircraft, hangars, and fuel.
- Date: 7 April 2017; 9 years ago 04:40 EEST (UTC+03:00)
- Executed by: United States Navy
- Casualties: At least 16 killed (per Talal Barazi, governor of Homs); 9 civilians killed including 4 children 9 soldiers killed (per SOHR); 9-20 aircraft destroyed 1 SAM battery destroyed
- Location of Shayrat Airbase in Syria

On the morning of 7 April 2017, the United States launched 59 Tomahawk cruise missiles from the Mediterranean Sea into Syria, aimed at Shayrat Airbase controlled by the Syrian government. The strike was executed on the authorization of U.S. president Donald Trump, as a direct response to the Khan Shaykhun chemical attack that occurred on 4 April.

The strike was the first unilateral military action by the United States targeting the Syrian Ba'athist government during the Syrian civil war. President Trump stated shortly thereafter, "It is in this vital national security interest of the United States to prevent and deter the spread and use of deadly chemical weapons."

The Syrian Air Force launched airstrikes against the rebels from the base only hours after the American attack. It was reported that advance warning was given to Russia, an ally of the Syrian government, by the US prior to the missile strike.

== Attack ==
President Trump delivers his announcement.

Missiles being launched from USS Porter

On the evening of 6 April, President Trump notified members of the U.S. Congress of his plan on the missile strike. According to a White House official, more than two dozen members of Congress were briefed at the notification. Internationally, the United States also notified several countries, including Canada, the UK, Australia, and Russia, in advance of the strike. The U.S. military stated it communicated with the Russian military to minimize any chance of Russian casualties. The strike was conducted without either U.S. congressional or United Nations Security Council approval. Commodore Tate Westbrook commanded the Navy task force in charge of the missile launch.

It was the first time that the United States had acknowledged intentionally carrying out military action against the forces of Syrian president Bashar al-Assad.

The strike targeted Shayrat Airbase in the Homs Governorate, which was believed by U.S. intelligence to be the base for the aircraft that carried out a chemical weapons attack on 4 April, and was intended to destroy air defenses, aircraft, hangars and fuel. The US avoided striking a suspected sarin gas storage facility at the targeted airport. Fifty-nine Tomahawk missiles were said to have been launched from two U.S. Navy warships, USS Ross and USS Porter, at around 20:40 EDT (04:40 local time). Reconnaissance was provided by Python 73, a Boeing RC-135 of the 55th Wing.

== Casualties ==
U.S. Central Command stated in a press release that Tomahawk missiles hit "aircraft, hardened aircraft shelters, petroleum and logistical storage, ammunition supply bunkers, defense systems, and radars". Initial U.S. reports claimed "approximately 20 planes" were destroyed, and that 58 out of the 59 cruise missiles launched "severely degraded or destroyed" their intended target. According to the satellite images the runways and the taxiways have been reportedly undamaged and combat flights from the attacked airbase resumed on 7 April a few hours after the attack, although U.S. officials did not state that the runway was a target. In a later statement on 10 April 2017, the US secretary of defense James Mattis claimed that the strike destroyed about 20% of the Syrian government's operational aircraft and the base had lost the ability to refuel or rearm aircraft.

An independent bomb damage assessment conducted by ImageSat International counted hits on 44 targets, with some targets being hit by more than one missile; these figures were determined using satellite images of the airbase 10 hours after the strike. Among the targets struck was a 2K12 Kub (SA6) missile battery composed of five elements.

The Syrian Observatory for Human Rights said the strike damaged over a dozen hangars, a fuel depot, and an air defense base.

Al-Masdar News reported that 15 fighter jets were damaged or destroyed and that the destruction of fuel tankers caused several explosions and a large fire.

According to the claims of Russian defense ministry, the "combat effectiveness" of the attack was "extremely low"; they claimed that only 23 missiles hit the base destroying six aircraft, and it did not know where the other 36 landed. Russian television news, citing a Syrian source at the airfield, said that nine planes were destroyed by the strikes (5 Su-22M3s, 1 Su-22M4, and 3 Mig-23ML) and that all planes were thought to have been out of action at the time. The Israeli satellite imagery services company ImageSat International later released high resolution satellite images of the base taken within 10 hours of the attack showing that at a minimum, 44 targets had been hit, and that some had been hit multiple times.

Seven or nine Syrian soldiers were killed, including a general; Russian military personnel were also present at the airbase at the time it was attacked. According to Syrian state news SANA, nine civilians were also killed in the attack, including four children. SANA also stated that five of the civilians were killed in the village of Shayrat, outside the base, while another four were killed in the village of Al-Hamrat, and that another seven civilians were wounded when a missile hit homes in Al-Manzul, four kilometers (two and a half miles) away from the Shayrat air base. According to Russian defense ministry spokesperson Igor Konashenkov, four Syrian soldiers were killed and another two were missing.

Some observers believe that the Russian government warned the Syrian government, which had enough time to move planes to another base.

== Aftermath ==
Hours after the U.S. missile strike, Syrian military aircraft took off from the Shayrat base to attack rebel positions again, including the town of Khan Shaykhun. Commentators attributed the ability of the Syrian government to continue to operate from the base to the fact that the US gave Russia, Syria's ally, an advanced warning regarding the strike, which enabled Syrians to shelter many of its aircraft from the attack.

Within a day of the attack, Russia announced it would strengthen Syria's air defenses and formally notified the Pentagon that as of 21:00 GMT (00:00 Moscow Time, 8 April 2017), Russia had suspended the U.S.–Russia Memorandum of Mutual Understanding, which had established a hotline between the countries' militaries designed to avoid collisions between their aircraft over Syria. As a result, Belgium suspended its air operations in Syria, and the US began limiting itself to only the most essential air strikes.

According to some local sources, the Islamic State of Iraq and the Levant took advantage of the attack and absence of the Syrian Air Force in eastern Homs, by launching several attacks on the Syrian Army's defenses in the western Palmyra countryside. It also attacked the checkpoints outside the village of al-Furqalas, but those attacks were repelled. According to the Syrian Observatory for Human Rights, the Shayrat airbase remained operational and Syrian warplanes took off from it the following day. The price of oil briefly rose over 2% following the strike.

After both the chemical attack and missile strike, the U.S. administration was in disagreement and contradiction to U.S. policy from 2013 until 30 March 2017, as well the statements by U.S. ambassador to U.N. Nikki Haley, United States secretary of state Rex Tillerson, White House press secretary Sean Spicer and National Security Advisor H. R. McMaster differed on the change of U.S. military posture toward Syria and prioritization of regime change.

On 7 April 2017, an emergency meeting of the United Nations Security Council was held: Bolivia's ambassador Sacha Llorenty requested a closed session to discuss the U.S. strike, but U.S. ambassador Nikki Haley, serving as the council president for April, forced the meeting to be held in public view. United Nations News Centre reported that while some delegates expressed support for the strikes as a response to the Syrian government's alleged use of chemical weapons, others condemned it as a unilateral act of aggression, underlining that the Council must authorize any such intervention.

On 8 April 2017, the UK Foreign Secretary Boris Johnson issued a statement that announced that, upon consultations with the U.S. Secretary of State Rex Tillerson, he had cancelled his trip to Moscow scheduled for 10 April. On 11 April 2017, after the meeting at Lucca in Italy the Group of Seven unanimously blamed the Syrian government's military for the chemical attack and agreed that Assad must step down as part of any peace solution, but European allies rejected the US and UK push for sanctions against Russia and Syria.

On 19 April 2017, two US defense officials said that the Syrian government had relocated the majority of its combat planes to Khmeimim Airbase shortly after the strike.

In September 2020, U.S. president Trump mentioned that he wanted to kill al-Assad in 2017, by saying: "I would have rather taken him out. I had him all set, Mattis didn't want to do it."

== Reactions ==
=== United States ===
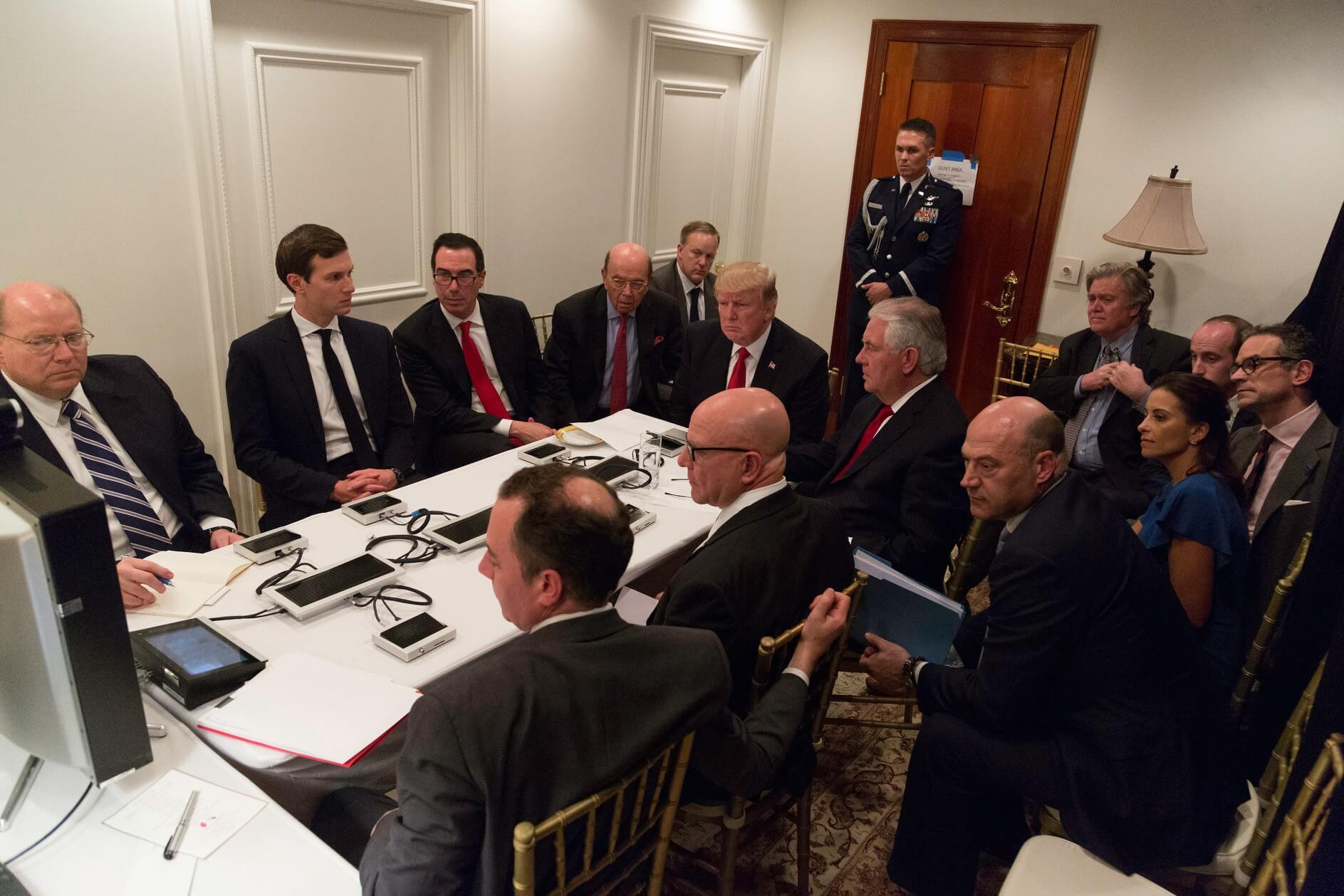
Trump receives a briefing on a military strike on Syria from his National Security team.

==== Politicians ====
Reactions from members of Congress were largely supportive but not uniform by political party. Paul Ryan (R–WI), the speaker of the United States House of Representatives, said the strike was "appropriate and just". House Majority Leader Kevin McCarthy (R–CA) said, "Assad has made his disregard for innocent human life and long-standing norms against chemical weapons use crystal clear. Tonight's strikes show these evil actions carry consequences." House minority leader Nancy Pelosi (D–CA) said, "Tonight's strike in Syria appears to be a proportional response to the regime's use of chemical weapons." Senate majority leader Mitch McConnell (R–KY) said the strike was "perfectly executed and for the right purpose". Senate minority leader Chuck Schumer (D–NY) said, "Making sure Assad knows that when he commits such despicable atrocities he will pay a price is the right thing to do." Senator Bill Nelson (D–FL) expressed his support, and said, "I hope this teaches Assad not to use chemical weapons again." Senator Marco Rubio (R–FL) called it an "important decisive step". Quoting the president's statement, Senator Orrin Hatch (R–UT) tweeted, "'No child of God should ever suffer such horror.' Amen." In a joint statement, Senators John McCain (R–AZ) and Lindsey Graham (R–SC) said, "Unlike the previous administration, President Trump confronted a pivotal moment in Syria and took action. For that, he deserves the support of the American people." Their sentiment was shared by fellow Senators Bob Corker (R–TN), Tom Cotton (R–AR), Joni Ernst (R–IA), Cory Gardner (R–CO), David Perdue (R–GA), Ben Sasse (R–NE), and Thom Tillis (R–NC). Many members who supported the action showed lack of worry about the authority issues or did not know the legal and constitutional rationale that supported the action.

Other lawmakers criticized the President's actions, or urged caution. Representative Adam Schiff (D–CA), the Ranking Member of the House Intelligence Committee, was informed of the strike by Dan Coats, the director of national intelligence, as it was happening. He urged the administration "not to make this a military effort to change the regime". In a joint statement, Representatives and Iraq War veterans Seth Moulton (D–MA) and Steve Russell (R–OK) said, "We cannot stand by in silence as dictators murder children with chemical weapons, but military action without clear goals and objectives gets us nowhere." Senator Chris Coons (D–DE) said he was "gravely concerned that the United States is engaging further militarily in Syria without a well-thought-out, comprehensive plan". Representative Ted Lieu (D–CA) and Senator Tim Kaine (D–VA) called the strike unconstitutional, with the former tweeting, "This was done with no debate in Congress and no explanation to the American people." Senator Bernie Sanders (I-VT) tweeted that the strike could lead the U.S. into a new long-term quagmire, and that "such engagements are disastrous for American security, for the American economy, and for the American people". Representative Tulsi Gabbard (D–HI) gave a more critical message, and said, "This escalation is short-sighted and will lead to the death of more civilians, more refugees, the strengthening of al-Qaeda and other terrorists, and a possible nuclear war between the United States and Russia." Other lawmakers expressing criticism included Senators Michael Bennet (D–CO), Ben Cardin (D–MD), Ted Cruz (R–TX), Dick Durbin (D–IL), Ed Markey (D–MA), Jeff Merkley (D–OR), Elizabeth Warren (D–MA), and Representatives Joaquín Castro (D–TX) and Steny Hoyer (D–MD).

A number of Republicans with libertarian leanings also criticized the strike. Senator Mike Lee (R–UT) said, "President Trump should make his case in front of the American people and allow their elected representatives to debate the benefits and risks of further Middle East intervention to our national security interests." Senator Rand Paul (R–KY) tweeted, "While we all condemn the atrocities in Syria, the United States was not attacked." Representatives Justin Amash (R–MI) said, "Airstrikes are an act of war. Atrocities in Syria cannot justify a departure from Constitution, which vests in Congress the power to commence war", and Thomas Massie (R–KY) called it a "big mistake". Former congressman Ron Paul argued that because in Syria "things [had been] going along reasonably well for the conditions", there was "zero chance" that Assad had deliberately used chemical weapons, and called the attack a "false flag".

==== Public ====
A VOA segment that discusses the attacks with members of the public.

Major U.S. media outlets, such as The New York Times, The Washington Post, MSNBC and CNN, were all generally supportive of the administration's decision to use airstrikes against Syria; Fairness & Accuracy in Reporting, a progressive watchdog group, claimed that out of the 47 most-read American newspapers which published editorials about the airstrike, 39 expressed varyingly favorable opinions of it, seven were more ambiguous in tone, and only one (the Houston Chronicle) was explicitly negative.

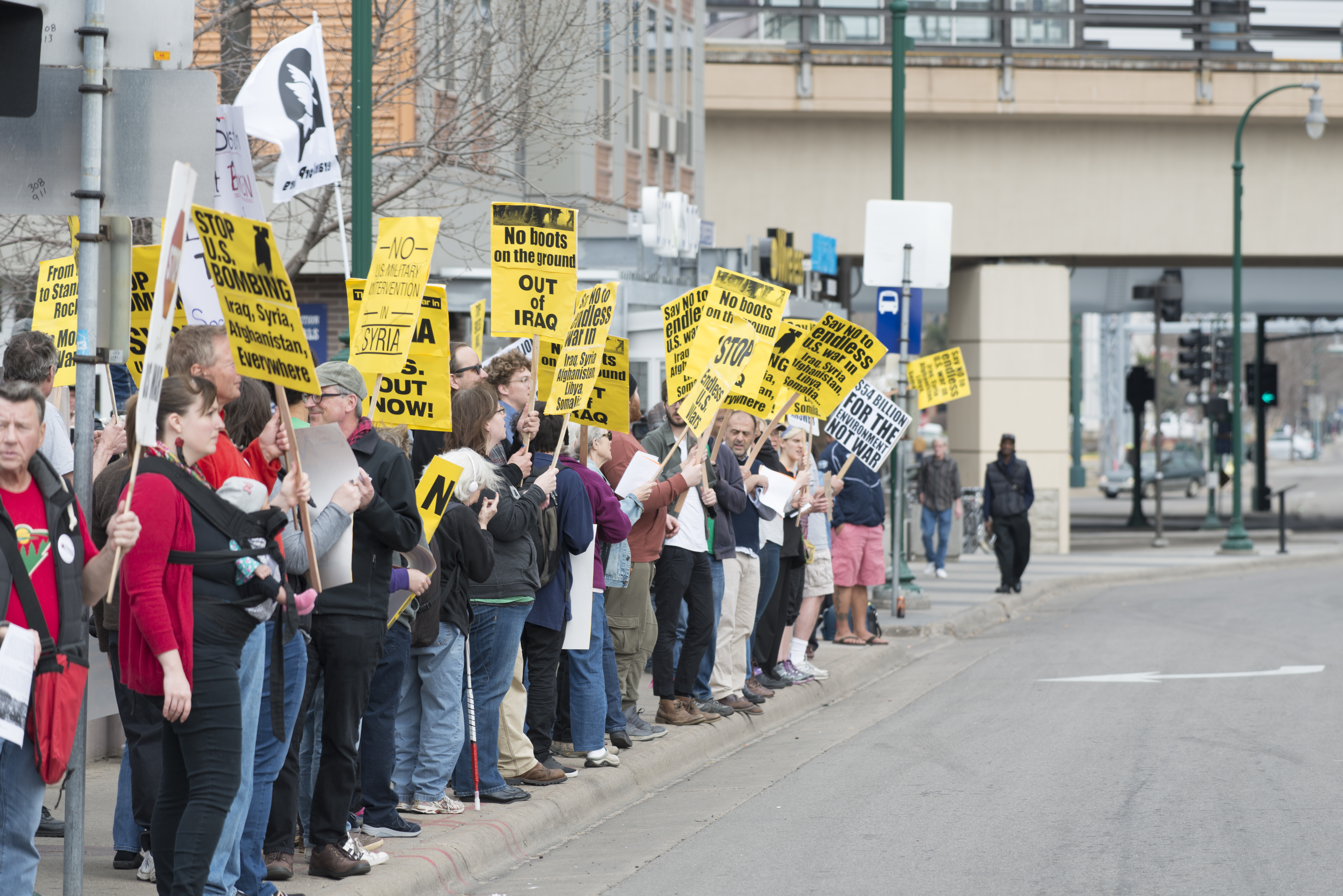
Protesters gather on Lake Street in south Minneapolis to protest the bombings.

A poll conducted by The Washington Post and ABC News reported that a "bare majority" of Americans supported the missile strikes and a similarly narrow majority opposed any further military action against the Syrian government. A poll conducted by The Huffington Post and YouGov reported that around 51% of Americans supported the decision, and slightly more than one-third opposed both the decision and any further military action, with 45% unsure regarding future action. A poll conducted by CBS News reported that a small majority (nearly 6/10) supported the attack, but the appearance of consensus ends regarding future action. A poll conducted by Politico and Morning Consult reported that 66% supported the strikes, which includes 35% who strongly support and 31% who somewhat support them.

Some right-wing populist commentators criticized Trump's reversal of policy towards war in Syria and the Middle East. Ann Coulter pointed out that Trump "campaigned on not getting involved in Mideast" and this was one of the reasons many voted for him.

Several protests were held in the U.S. which demonstrated against the attack.

=== Syria and allies ===
A joint command center of Russian and Iranian military in Syria, who support the Syrian government, said the strike crossed "red lines" and threatened to "respond with force" to "US aggression".

==== Syria ====
Syrian state media condemned the strike, calling it an "act of aggression", and claiming it caused unspecified losses. The Syrian Army said that its response will be to continue to "crush terrorism" and restore "peace and security to all Syrians". The Governor of Homs, Talal Barazi, said that the strike proves that the United States is supporting terrorism within Syria. Barazi told the Syrian News Channel that "they are not surprised today to see the supporting parties interfering directly after the failure of terrorists in targeting Syria".

The spokesperson for Syrian president Bashar al-Assad called the missile strikes "unjust and arrogant aggression", and an "outrageous act", and that the attack "does not change the deep policies" of the Syrian government. The Syrian Ambassador Bashar Jaafari at the UN Security Council session stated that "this act makes America a partner of ISIL, Al-Nusra and other terrorist groups", and it was a violation of the U.N. Charter. President Assad later told the Agence France-Presse that the chemical attack was "100% fabricated" and accused the United States of being "hand-in-glove with the terrorists" over the chemical attack. He also explained that the chemical attack was made up in order to give the United States an excuse to bomb the Shayrat airbase in retaliation.

Najib Ghadbian, a representative of the National Coalition for Syrian Revolutionary and Opposition Forces, welcomed the strikes: "They are first good steps but we would like them to be part of a bigger strategy that would put an end to the mass killing, an end to impunity and eventually we hope that they will lead to a kind of a political transition [in Syria]." The pro-Turkish Kurdish National Council welcomed the missile strikes in Syria. "All Syrian people, including the Kurds, are happy and welcoming such an air campaign by the United States", a leader in the Kurdish Unity Party, part of the KNC, stated.

Salih Muslim Muhammad, co-leader of the Democratic Union Party, stated that the attack "must yield positive results since the parties who did not believe in a political solution" will "reconsider" and "see that there is no military solution", and the US was "forced" to execute the attack. The PYD "hoped" that the US will not only attack the Syrian government, but "other parties have also used it, in Sheikh Maqsood, in Rojava, and Raqqa".

==== Russia ====
The Russian President's spokesperson said the U.S. strike was "an act of aggression against a sovereign country violating the norms of international law under a trumped-up pretext", which "substantially impair[ed]" Russia–United States relations. The Russian Government also alleged that the strike was an attempt to distract the world from civilian casualties in Iraq (an apparent reference to U.S. airstrike in Mosul that killed more than 200). The Russian foreign ministry denounced the strike as being based on false intelligence and against international law, suspended the Memorandum of Understanding (MoU) on Prevention of Flight Safety Incidents that had been signed with the U.S., and called an emergency meeting of the United Nations Security Council. Russian foreign minister Sergey Lavrov compared the strike to the 2003 invasion of Iraq. Russian prime minister Dimitry Medvedev said the attack had placed the U.S. on the cusp of warfare with Russia. Russia has sent the frigate Admiral Grigorovich to the east Mediterranean in response, and warned that the US strike could have "extremely serious" consequences.

==== Iran ====
Iran's president Hassan Rouhani condemned the U.S. military strike, saying Trump had claimed that "he wanted to fight terrorism, but today, all terrorists in Syria are celebrating the U.S. attack". According to Iranian foreign minister Mohammad Javad Zarif's tweet, "Not even two decades after 9/11, U.S. military fighting on same side as al-Qaida & ISIS in Yemen & Syria. Time to stop hype and cover-ups." He described U.S. concerns regarding chemical attacks as hypocritical, inasmuch as the United States had supported Iraqi forces under Saddam Hussein as they massively used chemical weapons during the Iran–Iraq War.

During Friday prayers in Tehran, worshipers protesting the strike chanted "Death to America" and "Death to Al Saud" – referring to the Saudi royal family. Ayatollah Mohammad Emami Kashani, who led the Friday prayers, called the United States "crazy" and blasted its "crimes". Ayatollah Kashani said that the Americans "gave chemical weapons and substances to the terrorists, while creating terrorists all over the world".

According to an analyst writing for HuffPost, the 2017 Deir ez-Zor missile strike by Iran suggests that the country has shifted its three decades-long policy of testing, but not using missiles, as a reaction to Donald Trump's escalation in the Middle East, including "needless increase" in America's military involvement in the Syrian proxy war.

=== International ===
The governments of Albania, Australia, Bahrain, Bulgaria, Canada, the Czech Republic, Denmark, Estonia, France, Georgia, Germany, Israel, Italy, Japan, Jordan, Kosovo, Kuwait, Latvia, Lithuania, New Zealand, Norway, Poland, Qatar, Romania, Saudi Arabia, Turkey, Ukraine, the United Arab Emirates, and the United Kingdom generally supported the strike, some calling it a just response and strong message against the use of chemical weapons. The North Atlantic Treaty Organization (NATO) and the European Union have also expressed support for the attack. During the 10 April European Union summit in Madrid, the leaders of southern EU nations (Cyprus, France, Greece, Italy, Malta, Portugal, Spain) said that a US missile strike on a Syrian airbase in retaliation for a suspected chemical attack was "understandable".

Luxembourg's foreign minister, Jean Asselborn, noted that the U.S. and Trump's change in policy toward Assad government was surprising, and considered an international diplomatic effort as a solution. Slovakia and Netherlands said they understood why the strike was carried out, but that it is important to de-escalate the situation as soon as possible. Finland stressed the role of the UN Security Council to work for a ceasefire and political negotiations to achieve sustainable peace. Austria also called for de-escalation of the situation and consider there can be only a political and not military solution for the conflict in Syria. The government of Cyprus believes the strike is not beyond international law if it concerns a serious violation of humanitarian law.

The Chinese, Greek, and Swedish governments offered neutral responses to the attack while the Indonesian government expressed concern over the attack. Trump told Xi Jinping, China's paramount leader and his guest at Mar-a-Lago, that he had ordered the attack; the missiles were near their targets as the Chinese leader left the resort. Xi told Trump that he understood the need of a military operation to respond when children were killed, according to Rex Tillerson. The Egyptian foreign ministry called on the United States and Russia to "contain the conflict" and reach a comprehensive and final resolution to the crisis, as did Hungarian Foreign Minister Péter Szijjártó who said that the civil war "cannot be resolved without an American-Russian accord" and Colombian President and 2016 Nobel Peace Prize laureate Juan Manuel Santos who called for a political solution to the conflict in Syria and dialogue between the United States and Russia to avoid escalating the already complex situation. The government of Switzerland has urged the international community to tackle the escalating Syrian crisis through diplomatic means rather than military confrontation. Taoiseach Enda Kenny of Ireland has described the strike as a "matter of grave concern"

The governments of Belarus, Brazil, Bolivia, Russia and Venezuela criticized the strikes, with Bolivia describing the actions as a violation of international law and Iran arguing that the strike would strengthen terrorists and complicate the war. Bolivian ambassador Sacha Llorenty accused the U.S. for "imperialistic action" and related the current US Security Council situation with the one from 2003 about the Iraq War, when Colin Powell wrongly alleged that Iraq was hiding weapons of mass destruction. Belarus condemned the attack as "unacceptable", while Venezuela described the attack as a violation of Syria's sovereignty. Brazilian Minister of Foreign Affairs Aloysio Nunes Ferreira condemned the "unilateral use of force" by the United States without authorization from the United Nations. North Korea said that the strikes were an unforgivable act of aggression and that the strikes demonstrate why the country is entitled to its nuclear weapons program.

The U.N. Secretary-General António Guterres appealed "for restraint to avoid any acts that could deepen the suffering of the Syrian people", and that "there is no other way to solve the conflict than through a political solution".

== See also ==
- April 2018 missile strikes against Syria
- International reactions to the 2013 Ghouta chemical attack § Military options
- List of United States attacks on Syria during the Syrian civil war
- September 2016 Deir ez-Zor air raid
