= Hunter, Kansas =

City in Mitchell County, Kansas

- City
- Location within Mitchell County and Kansas

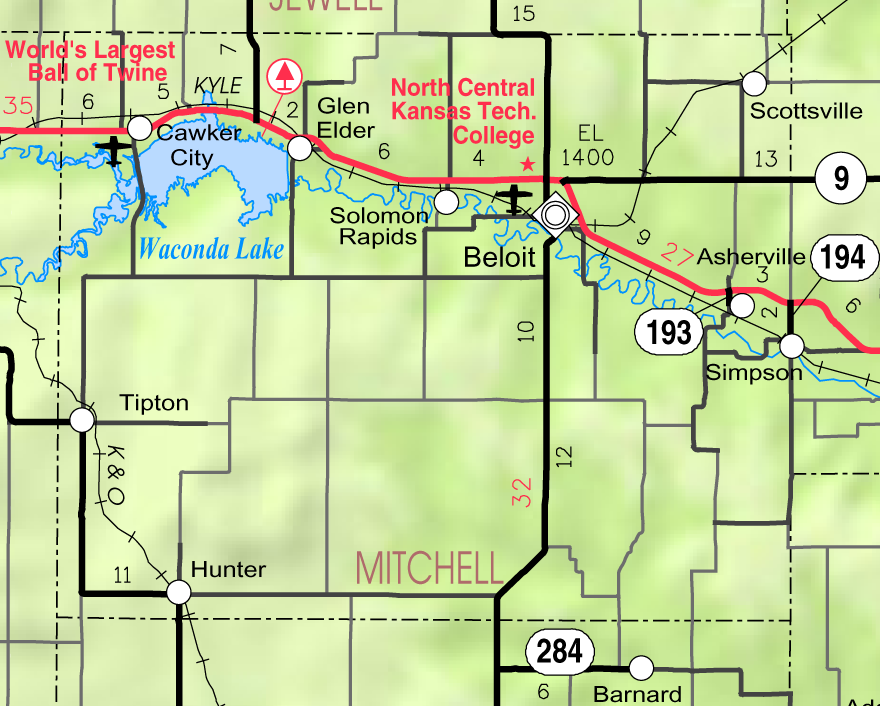
- KDOT map of Mitchell County (legend)
- Coordinates: 39°14′06″N 98°23′46″W
- Country: United States
- State: Kansas
- County: Mitchell
- Founded: 1890s
- Incorporated: 1918
- Named for: Al Hunter

Area
  - Total: 0.21 sq mi (0.54 km^{2})
  - Land: 0.21 sq mi (0.54 km^{2})
  - Water: 0 sq mi (0.00 km^{2})
- Elevation: 1,604 ft (489 m)

Population (2020)
  - Total: 51
  - Density: 240/sq mi (94/km^{2})
- Time zone: UTC-6 (CST)
  - Summer (DST): UTC-5 (CDT)
- ZIP Code: 67452
- Area code: 785
- FIPS code: 20-33525
- GNIS ID: 2394450
- Website: www.cityofhunter.org

Hunter is a city in Mitchell County, Kansas, United States. As of the 2020 census, the population of the city was 51.

== History ==
The first post office in Hunter was established in 1895. It was named for Al Hunter, an early settler. Hunter was incorporated in 1915.

== Geography ==
According to the United States Census Bureau, the city has a total area of 0.21 square miles (0.54 km^{2}), all of it land.

=== Climate ===
The climate in this area is characterized by hot, humid summers and generally mild to cool winters. According to the Köppen Climate Classification system, Hunter has a humid subtropical climate, abbreviated "Cfa" on climate maps.

== Demographics ==
Historical population
Census	Pop.	Note	%±
1920	205		—
1930	219		6.8%
1940	199		−9.1%
1950	236		18.6%
1960	229		−3.0%
1970	150		−34.5%
1980	135		−10.0%
1990	116		−14.1%
2000	77		−33.6%
2010	57		−26.0%
2020	51		−10.5%
U.S. Decennial Census

=== 2020 census ===
The 2020 United States census counted 51 people, 28 households, and 15 families in Hunter. The population density was 242.9 per square mile (93.8/km^{2}). There were 45 housing units at an average density of 214.3 per square mile (82.7/km^{2}). The racial makeup was 94.12% (48) white or European American (94.12% non-Hispanic white), 0.0% (0) black or African-American, 0.0% (0) Native American or Alaska Native, 1.96% (1) Asian, 0.0% (0) Pacific Islander or Native Hawaiian, 0.0% (0) from other races, and 3.92% (2) from two or more races. Hispanic or Latino of any race was 0.0% (0) of the population.

Of the 28 households, 25.0% had children under the age of 18; 32.1% were married couples living together; 28.6% had a female householder with no spouse or partner present. 32.1% of households consisted of individuals and 7.1% had someone living alone who was 65 years of age or older. The average household size was 1.9 and the average family size was 2.8. The percent of those with a bachelor's degree or higher was estimated to be 11.8% of the population.

21.6% of the population was under the age of 18, 3.9% from 18 to 24, 27.5% from 25 to 44, 19.6% from 45 to 64, and 27.5% who were 65 years of age or older. The median age was 37.5 years. For every 100 females, there were 131.8 males. For every 100 females ages 18 and older, there were 135.3 males.

The 2016–2020 5-year American Community Survey estimates show that the median household income was $30,000 (with a margin of error of +/- $29,934) and the median family income was $76,250 (+/- $29,979).

=== 2010 census ===
As of the census of 2010, there were 57 people, 33 households, and 15 families residing in the city. The population density was 271.4 inhabitants per square mile (104.8/km^{2}). There were 61 housing units at an average density of 290.5 per square mile (112.2/km^{2}). The racial makeup of the city was 98.2% White and 1.8% Native American. Hispanic or Latino of any race were 1.8% of the population.

There were 33 households, of which 15.2% had children under the age of 18 living with them, 36.4% were married couples living together, 6.1% had a female householder with no husband present, 3.0% had a male householder with no wife present, and 54.5% were non-families. 45.5% of all households were made up of individuals, and 30.3% had someone living alone who was 65 years of age or older. The average household size was 1.73 and the average family size was 2.33.

The median age in the city was 63.5 years. 14% of residents were under the age of 18; 5.4% were between the ages of 18 and 24; 14.1% were from 25 to 44; 17.6% were from 45 to 64; and 49.1% were 65 years of age or older. The gender makeup of the city was 43.9% male and 56.1% female.

== Education ==
The community is served by Sylvan–Lucas USD 299 public school district.

Hunter High School was established in 1917. Hunter, Sylvan Grove and Vesper schools united to form Sylvan Unified schools in 1966. In 2010, Sylvan unified with Lucas-Luray schools to form Sylvan-Lucas Unified.

The Hunter High School mascot was Hunter Huntsmen. Sylvan Unified as well as Sylvan-Lucas Unified mascot is the Mustangs.
