= Denmark, Kansas =

Unincorporated community in Lincoln County, Kansas

- Unincorporated community
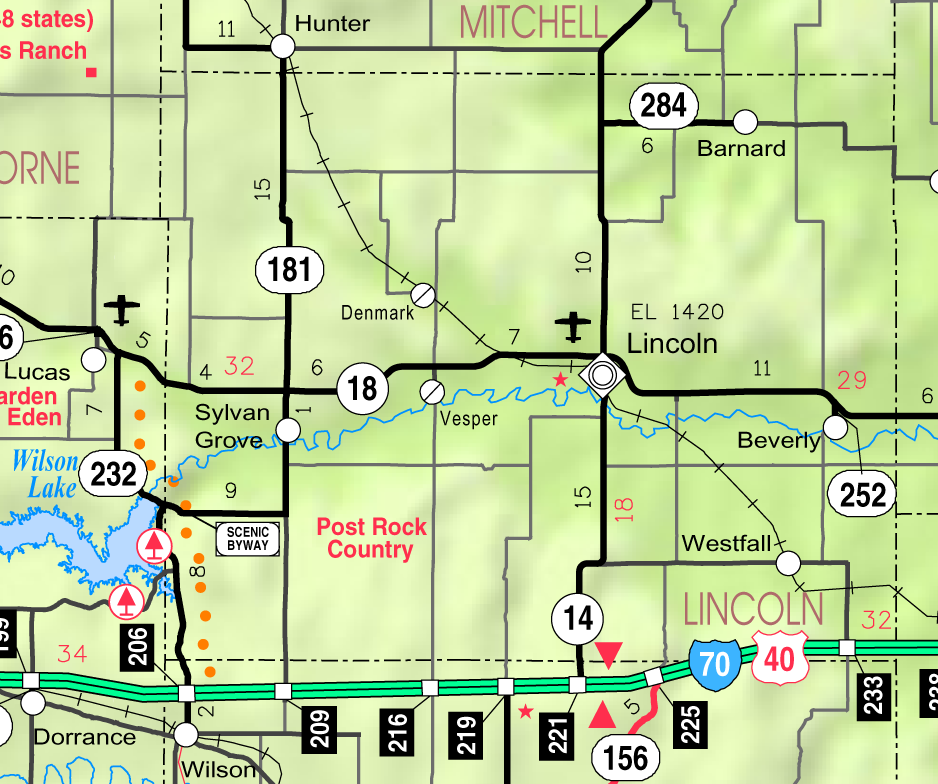
- KDOT map of Lincoln County (legend)

- Location within Kansas Location within the United States
- Coordinates: 39°05′21″N 98°17′13″W
- Country: United States
- State: Kansas
- County: Lincoln
- Elevation: 1,411 ft (430 m)
- Time zone: UTC-6 (CST)
  - Summer (DST): UTC-5 (CDT)
- FIPS code: 20-17650
- GNIS ID: 472547

Denmark is an unincorporated community in Lincoln County, Kansas, United States. It is northwest of Lincoln, and located three miles north of K-18.

== History ==
One of the first permanent settlements in Lincoln County, it was settled about 1869 by Danish Lutherans who laid the cornerstone for a stone church in 1876. Built of the "post rock" limestone that is so abundant in the county, it was completed in 1880. A bell tower and entry were added in 1901.

Denmark is part of "The Amazing 100 Miles". The history and folklore has been described by Ruth Sorensen in "Beyond the Prairie Wind".

== Geography ==
Denmark is located at 39°05′21″N 98°17′13″W.

== Education ==
The community is served by Sylvan–Lucas USD 299 public school district.
