= Sylvan Grove station =

- Sylvan Grove Union Pacific Depot
- U.S. National Register of Historic Places
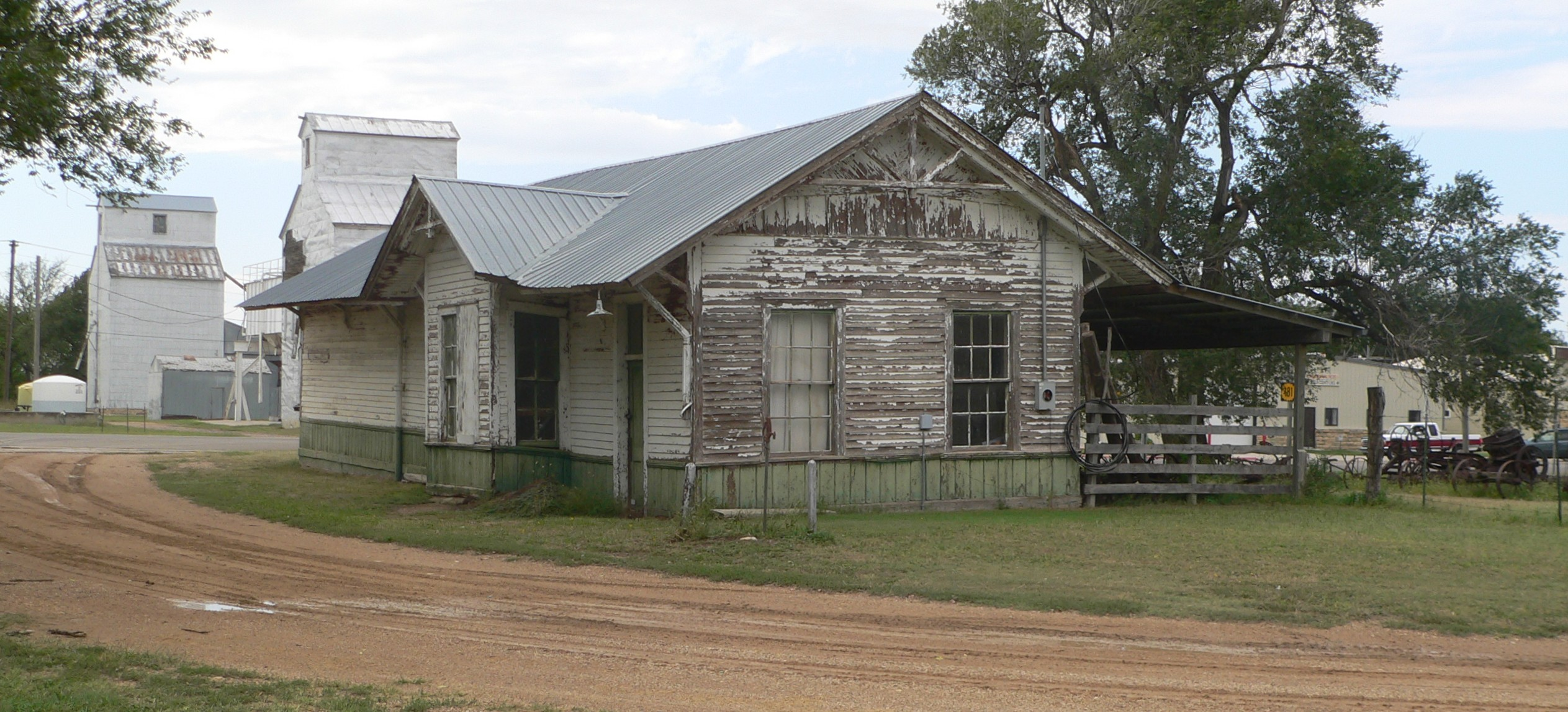

- Location within Kansas Location within the United States
- Location: 131 South Main Street; Sylvan Grove, Kansas
- Coordinates: 39°00′34″N 98°23′34″W
- Built: 1887
- Architect: Union Pacific Railroad
- Architectural style: Stick style
- NRHP reference No.: 14000118
- Added to NRHP: April 2, 2014

The Sylvan Grove station, nominated as the Sylvan Grove Union Pacific Depot, is a historic railroad depot building at 131 South Main Street in Sylvan Grove, Kansas. The depot was on the Salina to Oakley line of the Union Pacific Railroad.

== Background ==
It was built in 1887 concurrently with the extension of the Salina, Lincoln & Western Railway line by the Union Pacific Railroad. The line reached Sylvan Grove on August 25, with the depot completed by the end of September, except for paint work.

Passenger service to the depot ended in the late 1950s, although passengers were allowed to ride in the caboose of freight trains for a few years thereafter. The depot closed for good in 1968. The station was added to the National Register of Historic Places on April 2, 2014.
