= Sylvan–Lucas USD 299 =

Public school district in Sylvan Grove, Kansas

Address
- 504 W. 4th Street Sylvan Grove, Kansas, 67481; United States
- Coordinates: 39.0147°N 98.4012°W

District information
- Type: Public
- Grades: K to 12
- Schools: 2

Other information
- Website: usd299.org

Sylvan–Lucas USD 299 is a public unified school district headquartered in Sylvan Grove, Kansas, United States. The district includes the communities of Sylvan Grove, Lucas, Luray, Hunter, Denmark, Vesper, Ash Grove, and nearby rural areas.

== Schools ==
The school district operates the following schools:

- Sylvan-Lucas Unified Jr/Sr High School, in Sylvan Grove
- Lucas-Sylvan Unified Elementary School, in Lucas

== See also ==
- Kansas State Department of Education
- Kansas State High School Activities Association
- List of high schools in Kansas
- List of unified school districts in Kansas
