= Beverly, Kansas =

City in Lincoln County, Kansas

- City
- Location within Lincoln County and Kansas

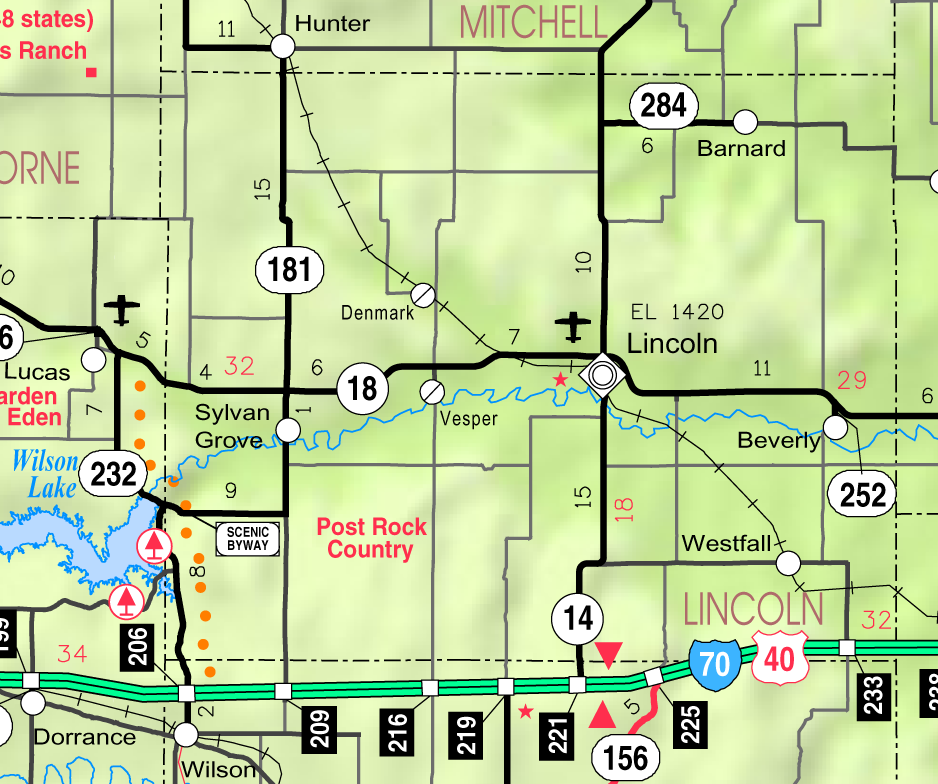
- KDOT map of Lincoln County (legend)
- Coordinates: 39°0′53″N 97°58′29″W
- Country: United States
- State: Kansas
- County: Lincoln
- Founded: 1886
- Incorporated: 1904
- Named for: Beverly, West Virginia

Area
  - Total: 0.20 sq mi (0.52 km^{2})
  - Land: 0.20 sq mi (0.52 km^{2})
  - Water: 0 sq mi (0.00 km^{2})
- Elevation: 1,322 ft (403 m)

Population (2020)
  - Total: 135
  - Density: 670/sq mi (260/km^{2})
- Time zone: UTC-6 (CST)
  - Summer (DST): UTC-5 (CDT)
- ZIP Code: 67423
- Area code: 785
- FIPS code: 20-06500
- GNIS ID: 476452
- Website: cityofbeverly.com

Beverly is a city in Lincoln County, Kansas, United States. As of the 2020 census, the population of the city was 135.

== History ==
Beverly was first settled in 1886, and it was incorporated as a city in 1904. The city was named after Beverly, West Virginia, the native home of a pioneer settler.

== Geography ==
According to the United States Census Bureau, the city has a total area of 0.20 square miles (0.52 km^{2}), all land.

== Demographics ==
Historical population
Census	Pop.	Note	%±
1910	335		—
1920	344		2.7%
1930	328		−4.7%
1940	292		−11.0%
1950	255		−12.7%
1960	199		−22.0%
1970	193		−3.0%
1980	171		−11.4%
1990	131		−23.4%
2000	199		51.9%
2010	162		−18.6%
2020	135		−16.7%
U.S. Decennial Census

=== 2020 census ===
The 2020 United States census counted 135 people, 63 households, and 33 families in Beverly. The population density was 678.4 per square mile (261.9/km^{2}). There were 80 housing units at an average density of 402.0 per square mile (155.2/km^{2}). The racial makeup was 89.63% (121) white or European American (87.41% non-Hispanic white), 0.74% (1) black or African-American, 3.7% (5) Native American or Alaska Native, 0.0% (0) Asian, 0.0% (0) Pacific Islander or Native Hawaiian, 2.22% (3) from other races, and 3.7% (5) from two or more races. Hispanic or Latino of any race was 5.93% (8) of the population.

Of the 63 households, 23.8% had children under the age of 18; 36.5% were married couples living together; 27.0% had a female householder with no spouse or partner present. 44.4% of households consisted of individuals and 19.0% had someone living alone who was 65 years of age or older. The average household size was 2.2 and the average family size was 3.1. The percent of those with a bachelor's degree or higher was estimated to be 6.7% of the population.

17.8% of the population was under the age of 18, 7.4% from 18 to 24, 20.7% from 25 to 44, 28.1% from 45 to 64, and 25.9% who were 65 years of age or older. The median age was 50.6 years. For every 100 females, there were 84.9 males. For every 100 females ages 18 and older, there were 88.1 males.

The 2016–2020 5-year American Community Survey estimates show that the median household income was $38,750 (with a margin of error of +/- $19,718) and the median family income was $67,500 (+/- $52,208). Males had a median income of $28,750 (+/- $12,138) versus $24,500 (+/- $5,845) for females. The median income for those above 16 years old was $25,833 (+/- $7,046). Approximately, 14.3% of families and 19.2% of the population were below the poverty line, including 13.3% of those under the age of 18 and 8.3% of those ages 65 or over.

=== 2010 census ===
As of the census of 2010, there were 162 people, 72 households, and 44 families residing in the city. The population density was 810.0 inhabitants per square mile (312.7/km^{2}). There were 88 housing units at an average density of 440.0 per square mile (169.9/km^{2}). The racial makeup of the city was 100.0% White. Hispanic or Latino of any race were 1.9% of the population.

There were 72 households, of which 27.8% had children under the age of 18 living with them, 41.7% were married couples living together, 12.5% had a female householder with no husband present, 6.9% had a male householder with no wife present, and 38.9% were non-families. 27.8% of all households were made up of individuals, and 13.9% had someone living alone who was 65 years of age or older. The average household size was 2.25 and the average family size was 2.64.

The median age in the city was 46.8 years. 19.1% of residents were under the age of 18; 7.5% were between the ages of 18 and 24; 20.4% were from 25 to 44; 36.4% were from 45 to 64; and 16.7% were 65 years of age or older. The gender makeup of the city was 45.1% male and 54.9% female.

== Education ==
The community is served by Lincoln USD 298 public school district.

Beverly schools were closed through school unification. The Beverly High School mascot was Bobcats.

== Notable people ==
- Donald K. Ross, World War II Medal of Honor recipient; was born in Beverly.
