= USS Ross (DDG-71) =

Arleigh Burke-class guided-missile destroyer

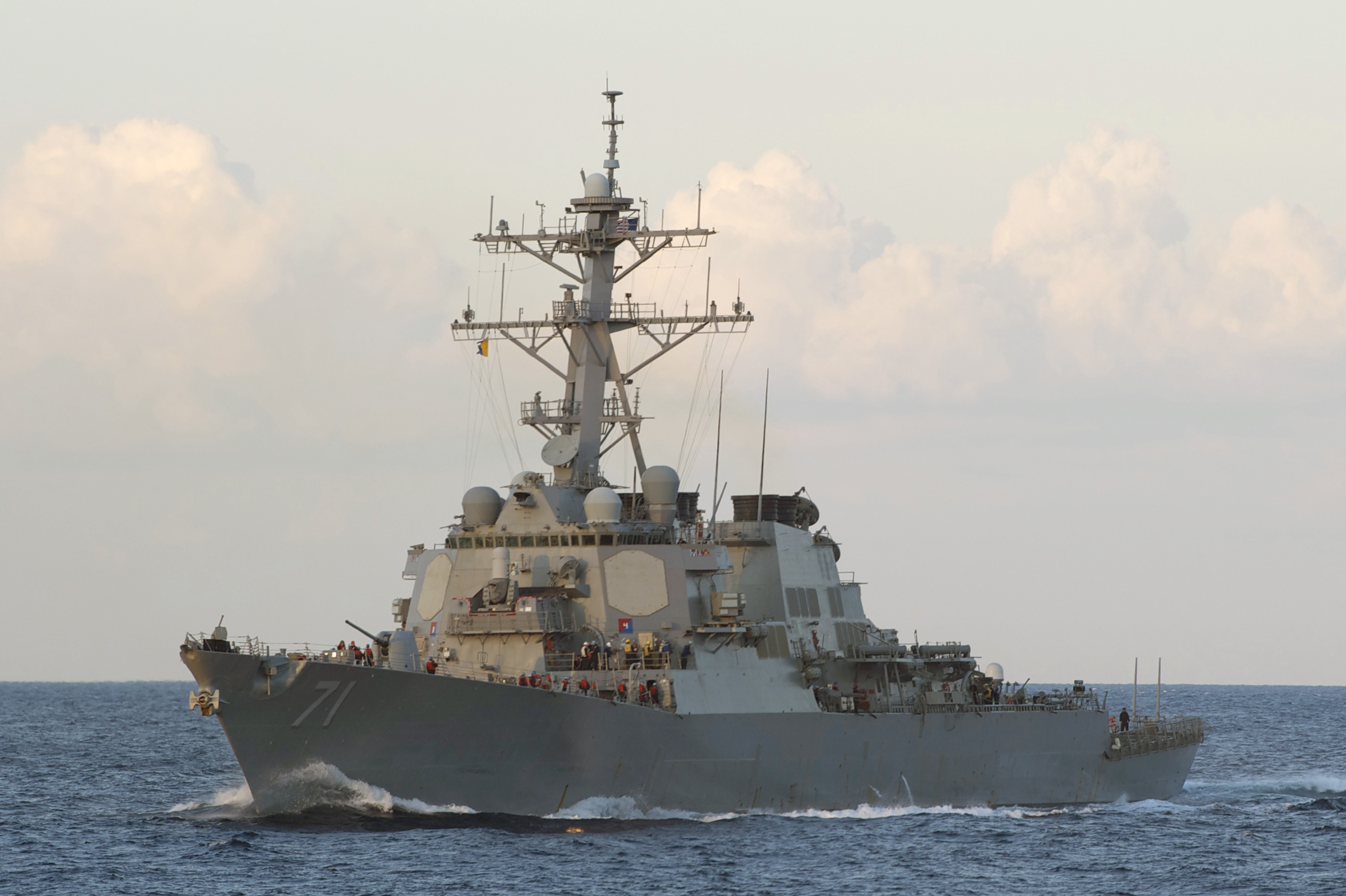
- USS Ross on 29 May 2005

History

United States
- Name: Ross
- Namesake: Donald K. Ross
- Ordered: 8 April 1992
- Builder: Ingalls Shipbuilding
- Laid down: 10 April 1995
- Launched: 22 March 1996
- Commissioned: 28 June 1997
- Home port: Norfolk
- Identification: MMSI number: 366350000; Callsign: NGWB; Hull number: DDG-71
- Motto: Fortune Favors Valor
- Nickname(s): Quad Cruiser
- Honours and awards: See Awards
- Status: in active service
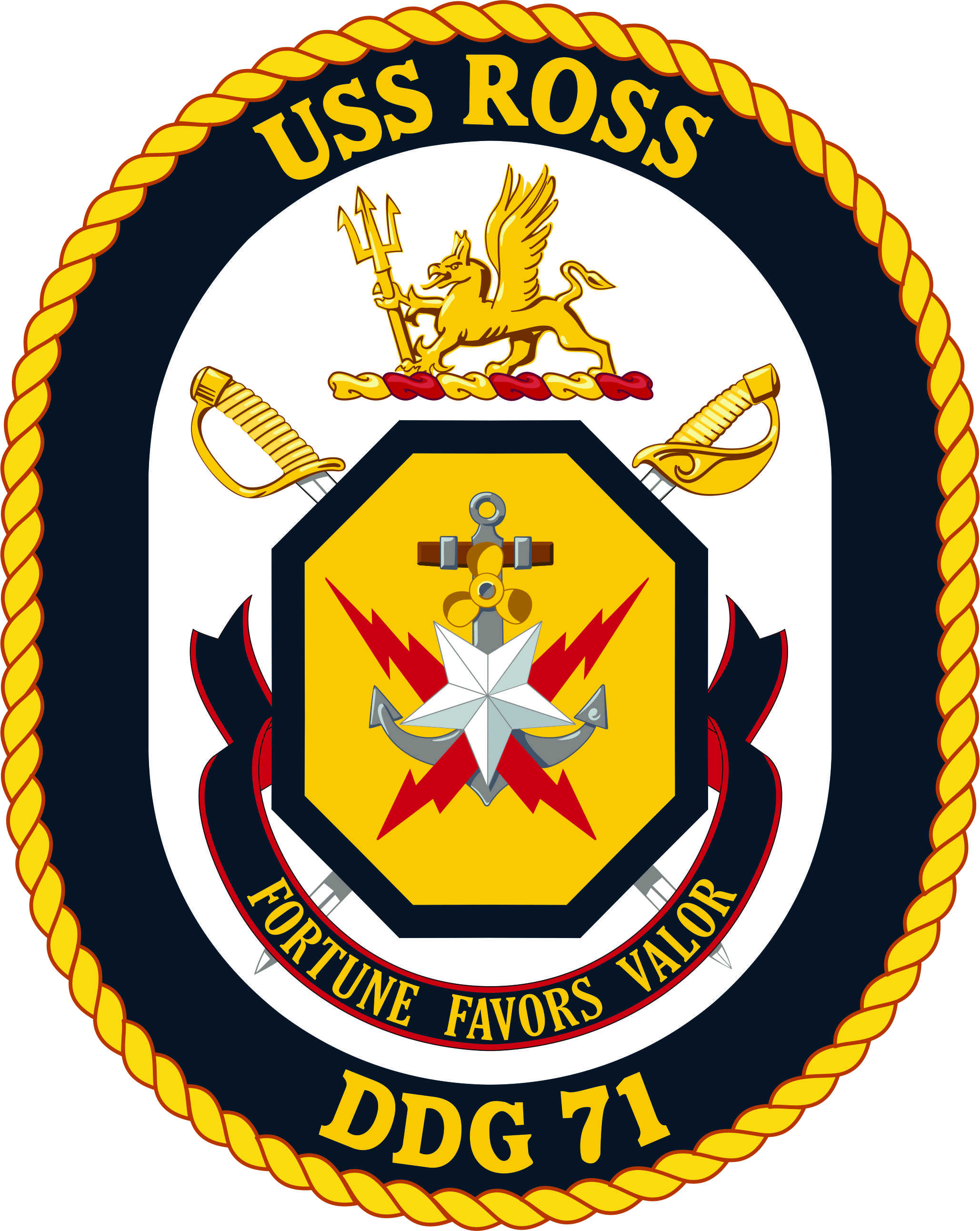
- Badge

General characteristics
- Class & type: Arleigh Burke-class destroyer
- Displacement: Light: approx. 6,800 long tons (6,900 t); Full: approx. 8,900 long tons (9,000 t)
- Length: 505 ft (154 m)
- Beam: 59 ft (18 m)
- Draft: 31 ft (9.4 m)
- Propulsion: 2 × shafts
- Speed: In excess of 30 kn (56 km/h; 35 mph)
- Range: 4,400 nmi (8,100 km; 5,100 mi) at 20 kn (37 km/h; 23 mph)
- Complement: 33 commissioned officers; 38 chief petty officers; 210 enlisted personnel
- Sensors & processing systems: AN/SPY-1D PESA 3D radar (Flight I, II, IIA); AN/SPY-6(V)1 AESA 3D radar (Flight III); AN/SPS-67(V)3 or (V)5 surface search radar (DDG-51 – DDG-118); AN/SPQ-9B surface search radar (DDG-119 onward); AN/SPS-73(V)12 surface search/navigation radar (DDG-51 – DDG-86); BridgeMaster E surface search/navigation radar (DDG-87 onward); 3 × AN/SPG-62 fire-control radar; Mk 46 optical sight system (Flight I, II, IIA); Mk 20 electro-optical sight system (Flight III); AN/SQQ-89 ASW combat system: AN/SQS-53C sonar array; AN/SQR-19 tactical towed array sonar (Flight I, II, IIA); TB-37U multi-function towed array sonar (DDG-113 onward); AN/SQQ-28 LAMPS III shipboard system
- Electronic warfare & decoys: AN/SLQ-32 electronic warfare suite; AN/SLQ-25 Nixie torpedo countermeasures; Mk 36 Mod 12 decoy launching systems; Mk 53 Nulka decoy launching systems; Mk 59 decoy launching systems
- Armament: Guns: 1 × 5-inch (127 mm)/54 mk 45 mod 1/2 (lightweight gun); 1 × 20 mm (0.8 in) Phalanx CIWS; 2 × 25 mm (0.98 in) Mk 38 machine gun system; 4 × 0.50 inches (12.7 mm) caliber guns; Missiles: 2 × Mk 141 Harpoon anti-ship missile launcher; 1 × SeaRAM CIWS; 1 × 29-cell, 1 × 61-cell (90 total cells) Mk 41 vertical launching system (VLS): RIM-66M surface-to-air missile; RIM-156 surface-to-air missile; RIM-161 anti-ballistic missile; BGM-109 Tomahawk cruise missile; RUM-139 vertical launch ASROC; Torpedoes: 2 × Mark 32 triple torpedo tubes: Mark 46 lightweight torpedo; Mark 50 lightweight torpedo; Mark 54 lightweight torpedo
- Aircraft carried: 1 × Sikorsky MH-60R

USS Ross (DDG-71) is an Arleigh Burke-class (Flight I) Aegis guided missile destroyer in the United States Navy and is the last of the Flight I variant. She is the second Navy ship to be named Ross, the first Navy ship named for Medal of Honor recipient Donald K. Ross. The first Ross, DD-563, was named for David Ross, a captain in the Continental Navy.

== Construction ==
Ross was the 10th ship of her class to be built at Ingalls Shipbuilding in Pascagoula, Mississippi. She was laid down on 10 April 1995; launched on 22 March 1996; sponsored by Mrs. Helen L. Ross, widow of the late Captain Ross; and commissioned on 28 June 1997, at Galveston, Texas, Commander Jeffrey R. Ginnow in command.

== Service history ==
After commissioning, Ross set sail for a Combat Systems Ship Qualification Trial, which lasted six weeks, and then sailed back to Pascagoula for three months for her Post Shakedown Availability (PSA). She was then returned to her homeport of Portsmouth, Virginia, and completed the Basic Training Phase: Engineering Certification, CART II, TSTA I, and III, Cruise Missile Tactical Qualification, Final Evaluation Period (FEP), and Logistics Management Assessment.

Ross completed her Intermediate Training Phase and set sail early in 1999 as part of Carrier Group 8, led by Theodore Roosevelt. The group sortied for a Joint Task Force Exercise to prepare for an upcoming six-month deployment set to commence on 26 March 1999. During this deployment to the Mediterranean Sea and Adriatic Sea Ross participated in Operation Allied Force. On 22 September, she returned to Naval Station Norfolk.

On 15 May 2000, she set sail for Northern Europe in order to participate in the Baltic Operations (BALTOPS) 2000. She served as the flagship for the Commander of Carrier Group Eight, and together with the destroyer Peterson operated with more than 50 ships from the numerous European countries. During these exercises Ross visited Stockholm, Sweden, and Kiel, Germany, before returning to the United States in late June.

On 16 October 2001, Ross was deployed to the Mediterranean Sea and Persian Gulf in support of Operation Enduring Freedom, and conducting operations in support of the U.N. resolutions against Iraq. During this deployment, Ross was again part of the Theodore Roosevelt Battle Group.

On 11 September 2001, Ross was underway on a three-hour notice in response to the September 11 attacks, acting temporarily as a Regional Air Defense Commander in support of Commander, North American Air Defense Command. Ross was also recognized that year with the Arizona Memorial Trophy for being the most combat ready ship in the US Navy.

On 6 June 2005, a .50 caliber machine gun on her deck fired while leaving a shipyard. The single .50 caliber bullet struck a nearby barge and two washing machines within the barge. The gun was discharged while performing a check on its firing operation.

Later in 2005, Ross participated in UNITAS 47-06 in place of the cruiser Thomas S. Gates due to the damage to Pascagoula created by Hurricane Katrina. Ross enjoyed liberty in Curaçao, St. Maarten, and Rio de Janeiro, while participating in the multi-ship exercise with naval forces from Argentina, Brazil, Chile, Spain, and Uruguay. During the return home, Ross encountered heavy seas at high speeds resulting in a tear in her hull. The crew isolated her flooding and performed de-watering during the remainder of the journey up the Atlantic coast eventually arriving in Norfolk in time for Thanksgiving.

In 2006, Ross returned from a six-month deployment to the Mediterranean Sea as part of Standing NATO Maritime Group 1. She conducted over 850 vessel queries, commanded over 17 ships from various nations, performed over 40 helicopter landings and takeoffs and 41 port visits to six countries and 14 ports. From 1 May 2006 to 7 November 2006, Ross traveled over 64,000 nautical miles (119,000 km; 74,000 mi). In Alicante, Spain, in August 2006, Ross became the group flagship, embarking the American commander of the standing maritime group. Her mission was to perform as part of Operation Active Endeavour; deterring terrorism, smuggling and human trafficking in the Mediterranean.

In September 2014, responding to turmoil in Ukraine, the US Navy announced that a guided missile destroyer had entered the Black Sea in order to participate with Ukrainian ships in the Exercise Sea Breeze. Ross "serves to demonstrate the United States' commitment to strengthening the collective security of NATO allies and partners in the region," the Navy said in a press release.

In November 2014, three sailors from Ross were attacked while ashore in the port of Istanbul, apparently by members of the Turkey Youth Union.

In May 2015, Ross was buzzed by a pair of Russian Su-24 Fencers at a distance of 500 m (1,600 ft) while the ship was on-station in the Black Sea. Russian Federation State media RIA Novosti quoted a military source, which claimed that Ross had acted aggressively and was scared away by the bombers. The US Navy published a statement, denying the Russian claims and pointing out that the ship was in international waters and did not deviate from its operations.

On 21 October 2015, Ross intercepted a Terrier missile as part of ASD-15 anti-ballistic missile testing in the North Sea. Ross spent the summer of 2017 conducting anti-submarine patrols around the Norwegian Sea and the Arctic Ocean.

On 7 April 2017, Ross and Porter, from their positions in the Eastern Mediterranean, fired a total of 59 Tomahawk missiles at specific military targets at the Shayrat airfield in Syria. The missile barrage was in response to the death of at least 80 civilians in the immediate aftermath of 4 April 2017, Khan Shaykhun chemical attack in Idlib province, an attack that the US government concluded was launched by the Syrian regime, from Shayrat.

United States Ambassador to Israel, David M. Friedman's remarks on USS Ross during its visit to the Israeli Port of Ashdod, 10 October 2018

On 16 February 2018, Ross joined USS Carney (DDG-64) in the Black Sea for an "unspecified regional proactive presence mission". The move follows increased tensions between Russia and the U.S. after American federal prosecutors announced indictments against 13 Russian citizens for their alleged interference in the 2016 U.S. presidential campaign.

In December 2019, Ross arrived in Odesa, Ukraine, on Christmas Eve, part of its mission in the Black Sea. Ross is the first U.S. vessel to stop in Odesa since the USS Porter made a port call there in October.

In 2020, Ross participated in a NATO task group deployment to the Barents Sea above the Arctic Circle, with HMS Sutherland (F81) and Norwegian frigate HNoMS Thor Heyerdahl, to exercise freedom of navigation near Russia. They were supported by a variety of aircraft.

On 6 September 2022, Ross departed Rota and began her journey to Norfolk for a scheduled port shift. She was relieved by USS Paul Ignatius (DDG-117).

== Upgrades ==
On 12 November 2009, the Missile Defense Agency announced that Ross would be upgraded during Fiscal Year 2012 to RIM-161 Standard Missile 3 (SM-3) capability in order to function as part of the Aegis Ballistic Missile Defense System.

In 2016, four destroyers patrolling with the U.S. 6th Fleet based in Naval Station Rota, Spain, including Ross received self-protection upgrades, replacing the aft Phalanx CIWS 20mm Vulcan cannon with the SeaRAM 11-cell RIM-116 Rolling Airframe Missile launcher. The SeaRam uses the same sensor dome as the Phalanx. This was the first time the close-range ship defense system was paired with an Aegis ship. All four ships to receive the upgrade were either Flight I or II, meaning they originally had two Phalanx CIWS systems when launched.

=== Awards ===
- Navy Unit Commendation - (Oct 2001–Apr 2002, 7 Apr 2017)
- Navy Meritorious Unit Commendation - (11–19 Sep 2002)
- Battle "E" - (1999, 2004, 2019)
- Arleigh Burke Fleet Trophy - (2014)

== Coat of arms ==
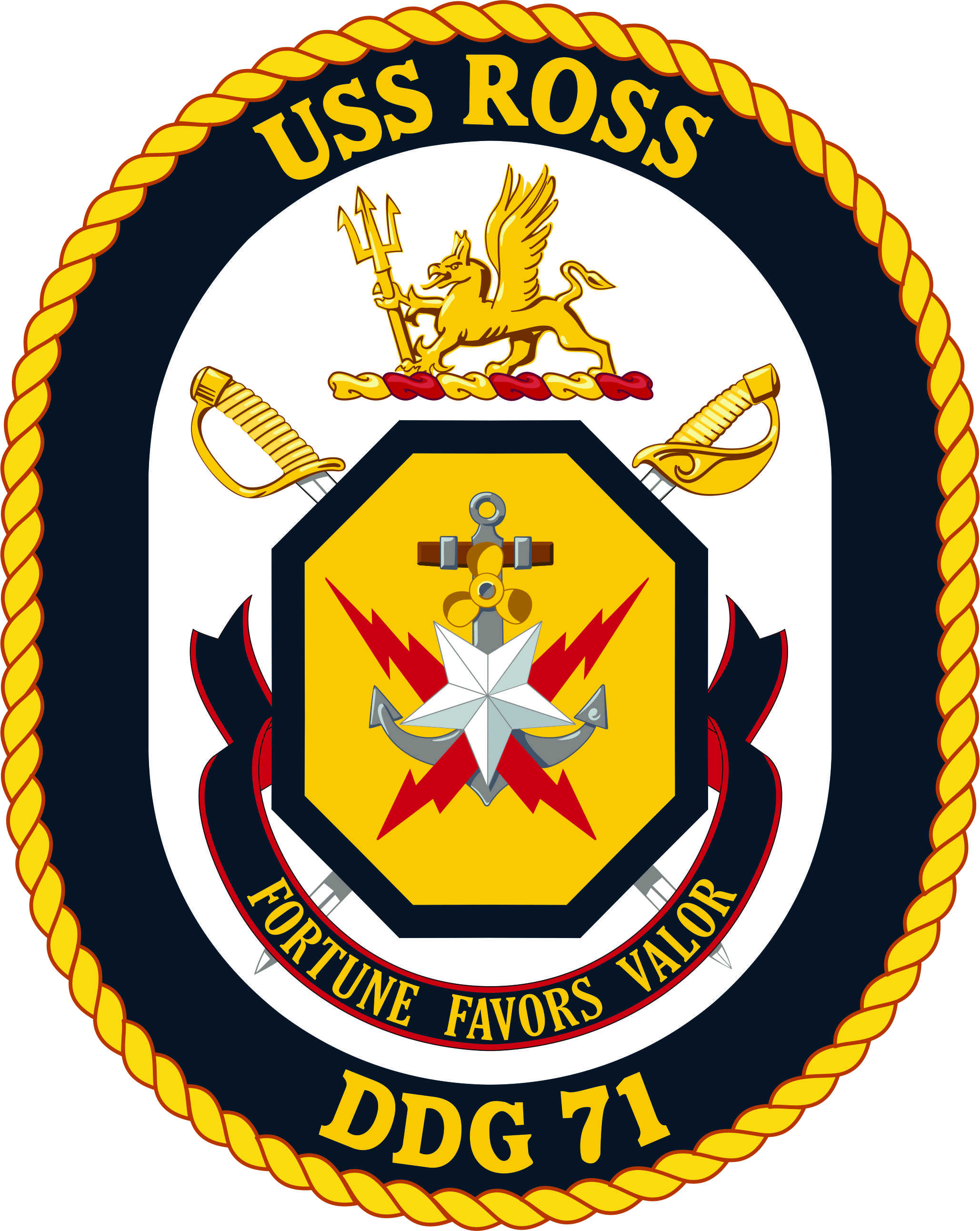

=== Shield ===
The shield is in the shape of an octagon with a gold background and blue trim. The center of the shield consists of an inverted silver star, anchor and crossing red lightning bolts.

The traditional Navy colors were chosen for the shield because dark blue and gold represents the sea and excellence respectively. The anchor represents the anchorage at Pearl Harbor, which brought the United States into World War II after being attacked 7 December 1941. The propeller represents Warrant Officer Ross and a Navy Machinist badge signifies the post he held at the time of action. The inverted silver star stands for his heroism during the attack and the Medal of Honor he received for valor on board the battleship USS Nevada. The shield's shape refers to the AEGIS combat system of DDG-71. The color gold represents excellence, while red denotes courage and sacrifice.

=== Crest ===
The crest consists of a griffin holding a trident with a red and gold framing below.

The griffin, denoting vigilance, intelligence, and valor, reflects USS Ross's versatile operational capabilities. The griffin holds a trident to represent the ship's offensive equipment with exceptional firepower. The color gold represents excellence.

=== Motto ===
The ship's motto, written on a scroll of blue that has a red reverse side, is "Fortune Favors Valor." It refers to the honorable feats of Captain Ross and the Medal of Honor he received.

=== Seal ===
The coat of arms in full color as in the blazon, upon a white background enclosed within a dark blue oval border edged on the outside with a gold rope and bearing the inscription "USS ROSS" at the top and "DDG 71" in the base all gold.
