= Al-Hamrat =

Al-Hamrat الحمرات
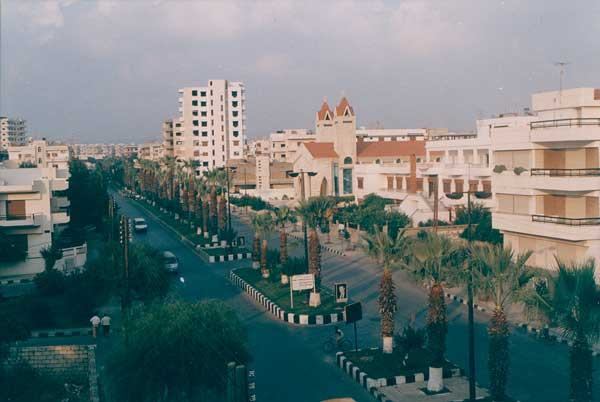

- Location in Syria
- Coordinates: 34°27′20″N 36°53′21″E
- Country: Syria
- Governorate: Homs
- District: Homs
- Subdistrict: Riqama

Population (2004)
  - Total: 1,624
- Time zone: UTC+3 (AST)

Al-Hamrat (Arabic: الحمرات, romanized: al-Ḥamrāt) is a village in central Syria, administratively part of the Homs Governorate. It is situated in a plain along the western fringes of the Syrian Desert. Nearby localities include the subdistrict center of al-Riqama to the north, Shayrat to the northeast, Sadad to the south, Hisyah to the southwest and Jandar to the northwest. According to the Central Bureau of Statistics (CBS), al-Hamrat had a population of 1,624 in the 2004 census. It has Syria's only Spoonbill breeding colony.
