= Donald K. Ross =

US Navy Medal of Honor recipient (1910–1992)

Donald Kirby Ross
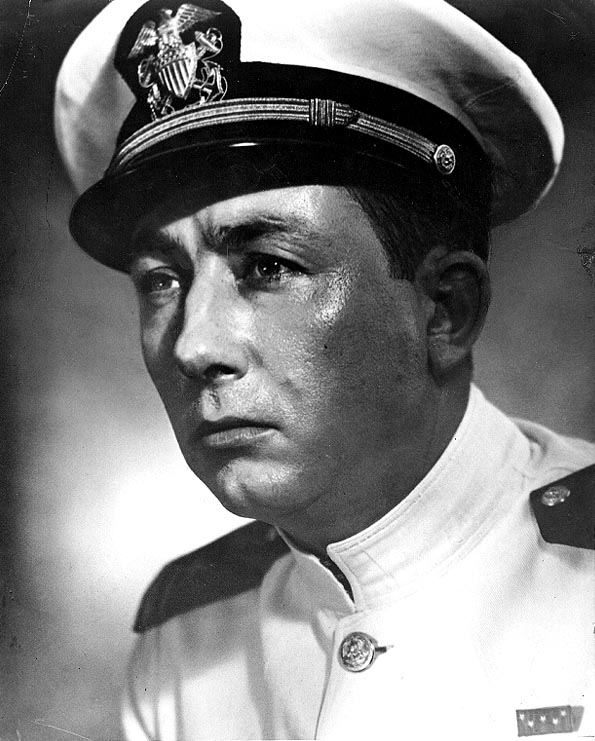
- Lieutenant Donald K. Ross, c. 1944
- Born: December 8, 1910; Beverly, Kansas, U.S.
- Died: May 27, 1992 (aged 81); Bremerton, Washington, U.S.
- Burial place: ashes were scattered at sea over the USS Nevada (BB-36)
- Military career
- Allegiance: United States of America
- Branch: United States Navy
- Service years: 1929–1956
- Rank: Captain
- Unit: USS Nevada
- Conflicts: World War II: Attack on Pearl Harbor; Battle of Normandy; Operation Dragoon
- Awards: Medal of Honor; Purple Heart

Donald Kirby Ross (December 8, 1910 – May 27, 1992) was an officer of the United States Navy who received the first Medal of Honor of World War II. This award was made for his actions during the Japanese attack on Pearl Harbor in 1941.

== Early career ==
Ross was born on December 8, 1910, in Beverly, Kansas. He enlisted in the U.S. Navy in Denver, Colorado, on June 3, 1929, and graduated as company honorsman from basic training at Naval Station San Diego. He completed Machinist Mate School at Norfolk, Virginia, first in his class and was assigned to the transport ship USS Henderson (AP-1) on a China service run.

While serving aboard the hospital ship USS Relief (AH-1), Ross saw his first action (with the U.S. Marines) in Nicaragua in 1931. Advancing through the ranks on the minesweeper USS Brant (AM-24), destroyer USS Simpson (DD-221) and cruiser USS Minneapolis (CA-36), he attained the rank of warrant officer machinist in October 1940, and was assigned to the battleship USS Nevada (BB-36).

== World War II and post-war career ==
During the December 7, 1941, Japanese attack on Pearl Harbor, Nevada was badly damaged by bombs and torpedoes. Ross distinguished himself by assuming responsibility to furnish power to get the ship underway — the only battleship to do so during the Japanese attack. When the forward dynamo room where he was stationed filled with smoke and steam, he ordered his men to leave and continued servicing the dynamo himself until being blinded and falling unconscious. Upon being rescued and resuscitated, he went back to secure the forward dynamo, then worked in the aft dynamo room until losing consciousness a second time due to exhaustion. After waking, he again returned to his duties until Nevada was beached. His actions kept the ship under power, preventing it from sinking in the channel and blocking other ships in the harbor.

Despite his impaired eyesight, Ross refused hospitalization and instead helped with rescue efforts. He entered a hospital three days after the attack, and his vision returned to normal after three weeks. He returned to Nevada, December 17, 1941, remaining in the ship's company for the duration of the war. For these actions, he was presented with the Medal of Honor by Admiral Chester Nimitz on April 18, 1942, becoming the first person to receive the medal in World War II.

Ross was promoted to chief warrant machinist in March 1942 and was commissioned an ensign in June 1942. Later in the war, he also served on Nevada during the landings at Normandy and Southern France.

He rose steadily in temporary rank to lieutenant commander by the end of the war, reverting to lieutenant at its conclusion. He again received promotion to lieutenant commander in 1949 and to commander in November 1954. Upon his retirement from active duty in July 1956, after twenty-seven years' of service aboard every type of surface ship then afloat, he was promoted to captain on the basis of his combat awards.

== Later years and legacy ==
After leaving the Navy, Ross settled in Port Orchard, Washington, and ran a dairy farm. He and his wife, Helen, had four children: Fred, Robert, Penny, and Donna.

He wrote a book about his fellow Medal of Honor recipients with ties to Washington State — Men of Valor — published in 1980. Ross attended the 50th anniversary ceremonies at Pearl Harbor on December 7, 1991, during which Ross was given the honor of introducing President George H. W. Bush. Ross also participated in the dedication of a memorial to his old ship, the USS Nevada.

Ross died of a heart attack in Bremerton, Washington, on May 27, 1992, at age 81. His ashes were scattered at sea over the USS Nevada.

In 1997, the guided-missile destroyer USS Ross (DDG-71) was named in his honor.

== Medal of Honor citation ==
Ross' official Medal of Honor citation reads:

For distinguished conduct in the line of his profession, extraordinary courage and disregard of his own life during the attack on the Fleet in Pearl Harbor, Territory of Hawaii, by Japanese forces on 7 December 1941. When his station in the forward dynamo room of the U.S.S. Nevada became almost untenable due to smoke, steam, and heat, Machinist Ross forced his men to leave that station and performed all the duties himself until blinded and unconscious. Upon being rescued and resuscitated, he returned and secured the forward dynamo room and proceeded to the after dynamo room where he was later again rendered unconscious by exhaustion. Again recovering consciousness he returned to his station where he remained until directed to abandon it.

== Awards and Decorations ==

1st row	Medal of Honor	Purple Heart	Navy Commendation Medal
2nd row	Combat Action Ribbon Retroactively Awarded, 1999	Second Nicaraguan; Campaign Medal	American Defense Service Medal with 'Fleet' clasp
3rd row	American Campaign Medal	Asiatic-Pacific Campaign Medal with 5 Campaign stars	European-African-Middle Eastern Campaign Medal with 2 Campaign stars
4th row	World War II Victory Medal	Navy Occupation Service Medal with 'Asia' clasp	National Defense Service Medal

== See also ==
Ross, Donald K. 0755: The Heroes of Pearl Harbor, Rokalu Press, 1988.
