= Al-Riqama =

Town in central Syria

Al-Riqama الرقاما
- Town
- Location in Syria
- Coordinates: 34°31′17″N 36°54′49″E
- Country: Syria
- Governorate: Homs
- District: Homs
- Subdistrict: Al-Riqama

Population (2004)
  - Total: 3,900

Al-Riqama (Arabic: الرقاما, romanized: ar-Riqāmā, also spelled ar-Raqamah) is a town in central Syria, administratively part of the Homs Governorate, located 34 kilometers southeast of Homs. Nearby localities include Dardaghan to the southwest, Shayrat to the southeast and Tell al-Naqa further to the north. According to the Central Bureau of Statistics (CBS), al-Riqama had a population of 3,900 in the 2004 census. Its inhabitants are predominantly Alawites.

Many of al-Riqama's inhabitants work in agriculture, cultivating dry cereals, grapes and almonds in irrigated fields, and raise sheep. The town's traditional houses are built from stone and have wood roofing. Al-Riqama had been classified as an abandoned village or khirba by English scholar Eli Smith in 1838. The town contains ruined historic structures noted for the dominant cone-shaped dome roofs. The structures have square bases with two-meter-high walls and are built from red mud brick.

== Bibliography ==
- Smith, Eli; Robinson, Edward (1841). Biblical Researches in Palestine, Mount Sinai and Arabia Petraea: A Journal of Travels in the Year 1838. Vol. 3. Crocker and Brewster.
