= Vesper, Kansas =

Unincorporated community in Lincoln County, Kansas

- Unincorporated community
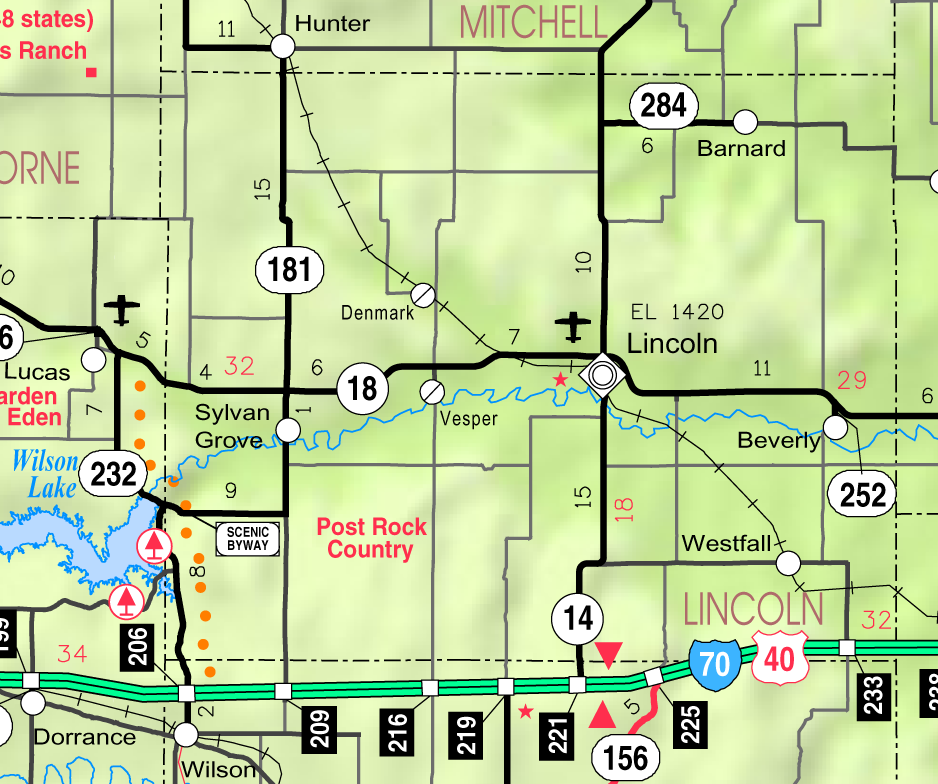
- KDOT map of Lincoln County (legend)

- Location within Kansas Location within the United States
- Coordinates: 39°1′55″N 98°16′48″W
- Country: United States
- State: Kansas
- County: Lincoln
- Founded: 1886
- Elevation: 1,394 ft (425 m)
- Time zone: UTC-6 (CST)
  - Summer (DST): UTC-5 (CDT)
- FIPS code: 20-73625
- GNIS ID: 472550

Vesper is an unincorporated community in Lincoln County, Kansas, United States. It is located about 7 miles (11 km) west of Lincoln.

== History ==
Vesper was laid out in 1886 when the railroad was extended to that point.

The post office in Vesper was discontinued in 1966.

== Education ==
The community is served by Sylvan–Lucas USD 299 public school district.

Vesper High School was established in 1914. Hunter, Sylvan Grove and Vesper schools united to form Sylvan Unified schools in 1966. In 2010, Sylvan Unified united with Lucas-Luray schools to form Sylvan-Lucas Unified schools.

The Vesper High School mascot was Vesper Cardinals. The Sylvan Unified, as well as that of Sylvan-Lucas Unified mascot is the Mustangs.
