= Sylvan Grove, Kansas =

City in Lincoln County, Kansas

- City
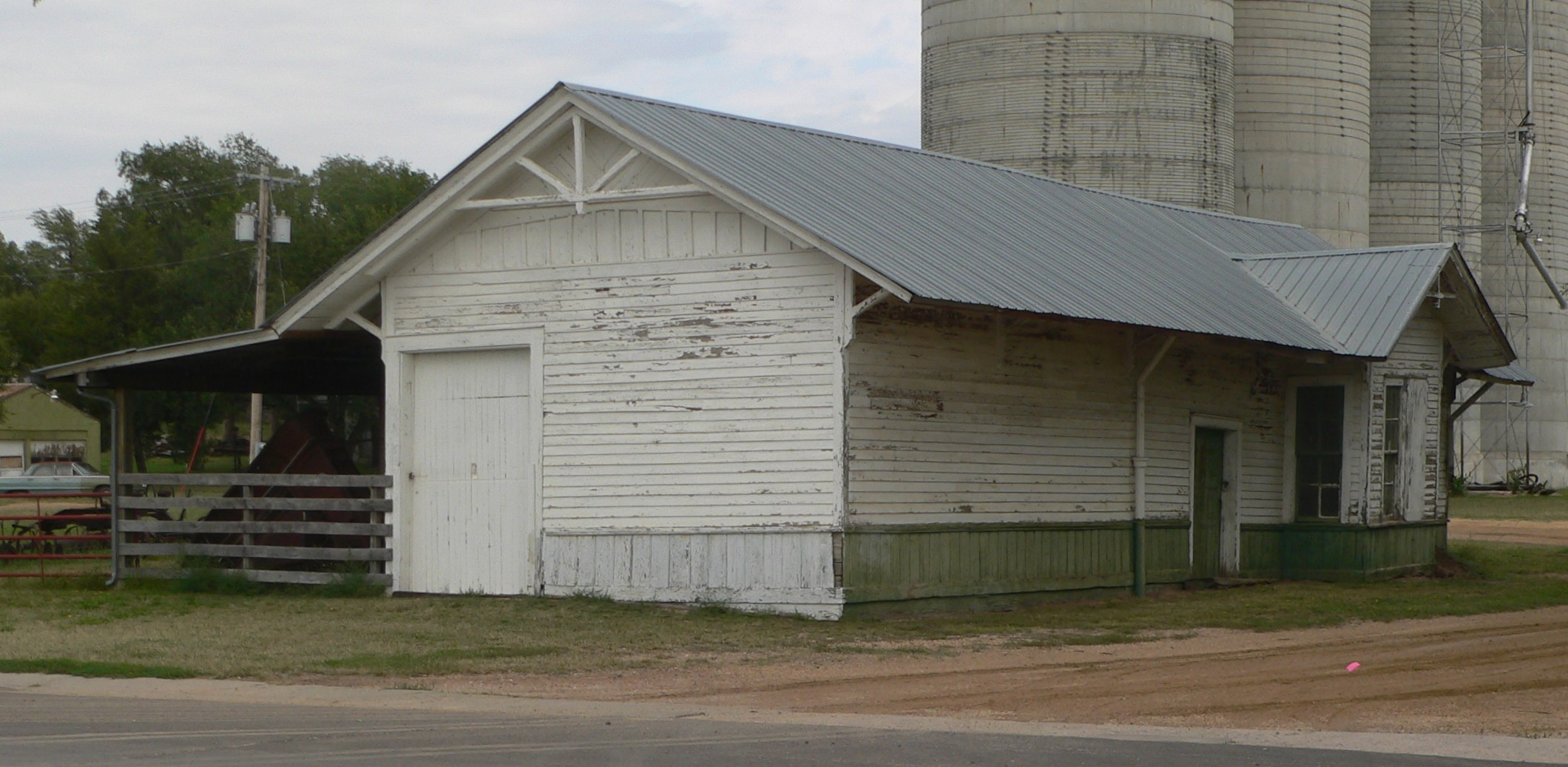
- Former rail depot (2014)

- Location within Lincoln County and Kansas

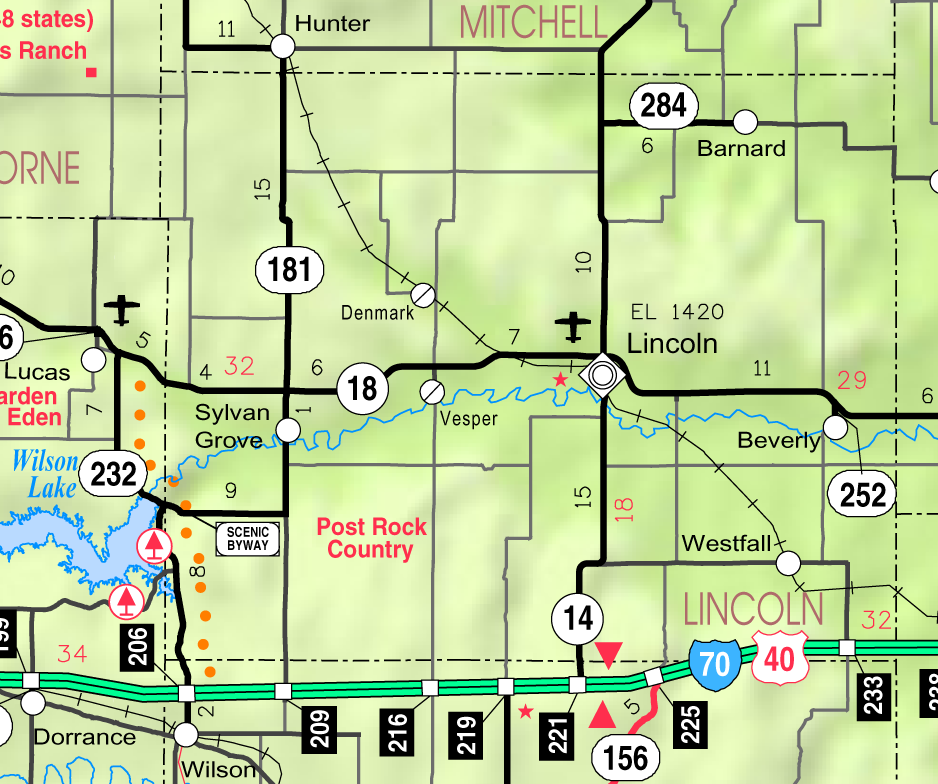
- KDOT map of Lincoln County (legend)
- Coordinates: 39°0′46″N 98°23′33″W
- Country: United States
- State: Kansas
- County: Lincoln
- Founded: 1877
- Incorporated: 1899
- Named for: sylvan groves

Area
  - Total: 0.39 sq mi (1.00 km^{2})
  - Land: 0.39 sq mi (1.00 km^{2})
  - Water: 0 sq mi (0.00 km^{2})
- Elevation: 1,444 ft (440 m)

Population (2020)
  - Total: 291
  - Density: 754/sq mi (291/km^{2})
- Time zone: UTC-6 (CST)
  - Summer (DST): UTC-5 (CDT)
- ZIP Code: 67481
- Area code: 785
- FIPS code: 20-69775
- GNIS ID: 472542

Sylvan Grove is a city in Lincoln County, Kansas, United States. As of the 2020 census, the population of the city was 291.

== History ==
Sylvan Grove was founded in 1877, at the site where a mill had been built in 1875. The city was named for twin sylvan groves near the original town site.

The Evangelical Lutheran School (at 38 N. Indiana St) and the Sylvan Grove Union Pacific Depot (131 S. Main St) are listed on the National Register of Historic Places.

== Geography ==
According to the United States Census Bureau, the city has a total area of 0.37 square miles (0.96 km^{2}), all land.

=== Climate ===
The climate in this area is characterized by hot, humid summers and generally mild to cool winters. According to the Köppen Climate Classification system, Sylvan Grove has a humid subtropical climate, abbreviated "Cfa" on climate maps.

== Demographics ==
Historical population
| Census | Pop. | Note | %± |
|---|---|---|---|
| 1880 | 25 | | — |
| 1900 | 319 | | — |
| 1910 | 464 | | 45.5% |
| 1920 | 450 | | −3.0% |
| 1930 | 530 | | 17.8% |
| 1940 | 540 | | 1.9% |
| 1950 | 506 | | −6.3% |
| 1960 | 400 | | −20.9% |
| 1970 | 403 | | 0.8% |
| 1980 | 376 | | −6.7% |
| 1990 | 321 | | −14.6% |
| 2000 | 324 | | 0.9% |
| 2010 | 279 | | −13.9% |
| 2020 | 291 | | 4.3% |
U.S. Decennial Census

=== 2010 census ===
As of the census of 2010, there were 279 people, 138 households, and 88 families living in the city. The population density was 754.1 inhabitants per square mile (291.2/km^{2}). There were 192 housing units at an average density of 518.9 per square mile (200.3/km^{2}). The racial makeup of the city was 98.6% White, 0.7% Native American, and 0.7% from two or more races. Hispanic or Latino of any race were 1.1% of the population.

There were 138 households, of which 22.5% had children under the age of 18 living with them, 46.4% were married couples living together, 12.3% had a female householder with no husband present, 5.1% had a male householder with no wife present, and 36.2% were non-families. 35.5% of all households were made up of individuals, and 14.5% had someone living alone who was 65 years of age or older. The average household size was 2.02 and the average family size was 2.58.

The median age in the city was 46.9 years. 22.2% of residents were under the age of 18; 3.6% were between the ages of 18 and 24; 18.7% were from 25 to 44; 35.1% were from 45 to 64; and 20.4% were 65 years of age or older. The gender makeup of the city was 51.6% male and 48.4% female.

=== 2000 census ===
As of the census of 2000, there were 324 people, 157 households, and 88 families living in the city. The population density was 876.5 inhabitants per square mile (338.4/km^{2}). There were 195 housing units at an average density of 527.6 per square mile (203.7/km^{2}). The racial makeup of the city was 96.91% White, 1.85% Native American, 0.93% from other races, and 0.31% from two or more races. Hispanic or Latino of any race were 1.54% of the population.

There were 157 households, out of which 21.7% had children under the age of 18 living with them, 48.4% were married couples living together, 3.8% had a female householder with no husband present, and 43.9% were non-families. 40.8% of all households were made up of individuals, and 24.8% had someone living alone who was 65 years of age or older. The average household size was 2.06 and the average family size was 2.82.

In the city, the population was spread out, with 21.0% under the age of 18, 4.9% from 18 to 24, 23.1% from 25 to 44, 23.5% from 45 to 64, and 27.5% who were 65 years of age or older. The median age was 46 years. For every 100 females, there were 98.8 males. For every 100 females age 18 and over, there were 98.4 males.

The median income for a household in the city was $27,188, and the median income for a family was $36,375. Males had a median income of $20,962 versus $16,250 for females. The per capita income for the city was $14,684. About 13.5% of families and 17.6% of the population were below the poverty line, including 27.4% of those under age 18 and 6.3% of those age 65 or over.

== Education ==
The community is served by Sylvan–Lucas USD 299 public school district.

School unification consolidated Sylvan Grove schools with Hunter and Vesper schools to form Sylvan Unified schools in 1966. In 2010, school unification combined Sylvan Unified with Lucas-Luray schools to form USD 299, Sylvan-Lucas Unified schools. Sylvan-Lucas Unified is located in Sylvan Grove.

The Sylvan Grove High School mascot was the Mustangs. Sylvan Unified and Sylvan-Lucas Unified mascot has been the Mustangs since unification.

=== Libraries ===
The Sylvan Grove Public Library was organized in the fall of 1925 by the Tuesday Club. The first library was housed in a central room above the Sylvan State Bank. In 1938, the city took over the library and it was moved to a southeast corner room of the bank. In 1949, a fund-raiser was held to purchase several hundred books. On December 1, 1956, the library was moved to its present location in City Hall.

== See also ==
- Wilson Lake and Wilson State Park
