= Cummins Block Building =

- U.S. National Register of Historic Places
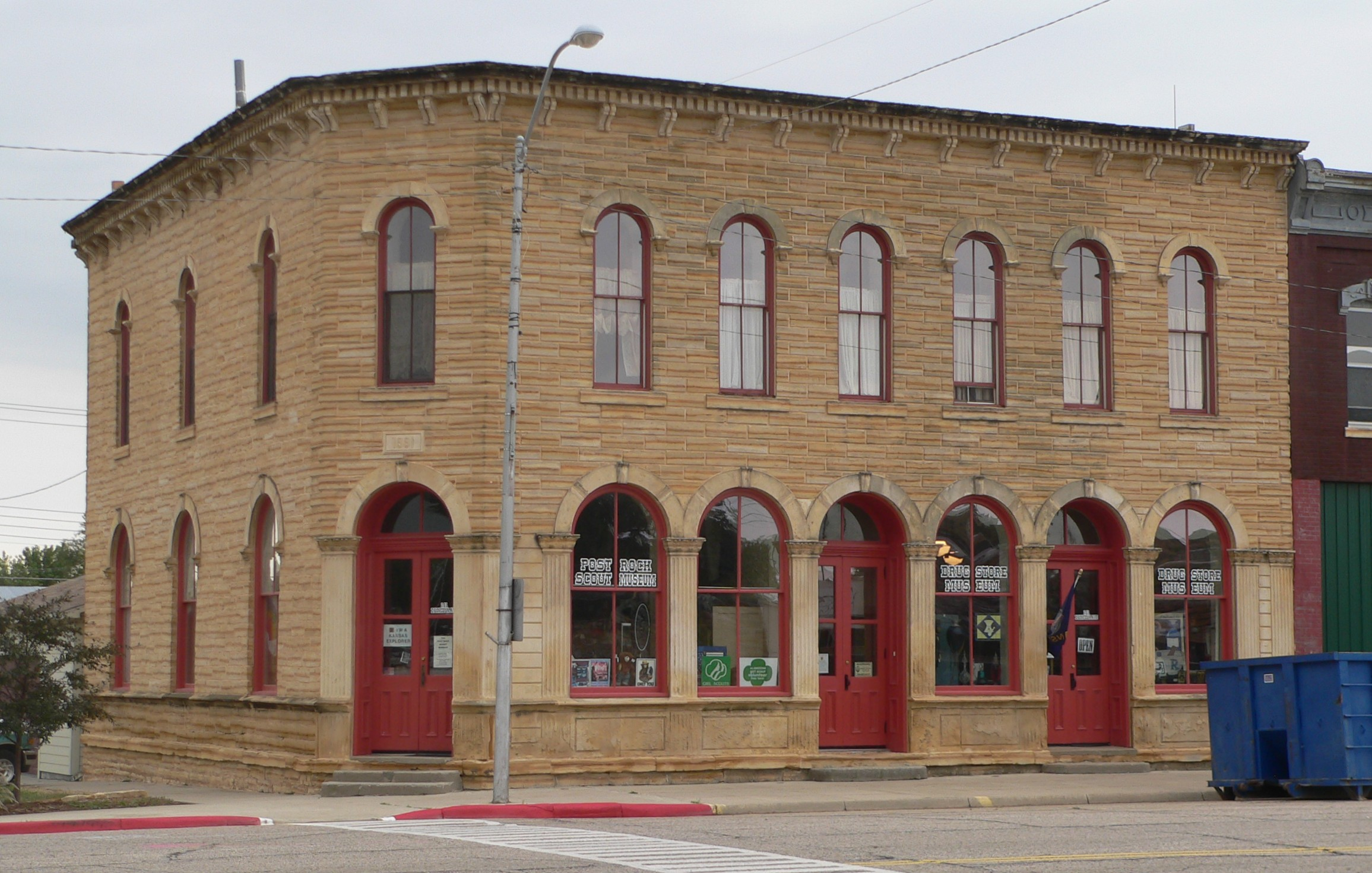

- Location within Kansas Location within the United States
- Location: 161 East Lincoln, Lincoln, Kansas
- Coordinates: 39°2′24″N 98°8′47″W
- Area: less than one acre
- Built: 1881
- Built by: Robertson, Malcom
- Architectural style: Italianate
- NRHP reference No.: 00000268
- Added to NRHP: March 24, 2000

The Cummins Block Building, located at 161 E. Lincoln in Lincoln, Kansas, was listed on the National Register of Historic Places in 2000.

It is a two-part commercial block building, built in 1881, 45 feet (14 m) along its facade and 50 feet (15 m) deep.

It was deemed notable "for its historical association with the growth and development of Lincoln, Kansas and ... for its architectural significance as an Italianate commercial block."
