= Science & Global Security =

- Discipline: International security
- Language: English
- Edited by: Alexander Glaser, Zia Mian, Pavel Podvig

Publication details
- History: 1989-present
- Publisher: Routledge
- Frequency: Triannually
- Open access: Hybrid

Standard abbreviations
- ISO 4: Sci. Glob. Secur.

Indexing
- ISSN: 0892-9882 (print); 1547-7800 (web)
- LCCN: 2003215719
- OCLC no.: 50447044

Links
- Journal homepage; Journal page at publisher's website; Online access; Online archive

Science & Global Security is a triannual peer-reviewed academic journal covering research on all aspects of international security. It was established in 1989 and is published by Routledge. The journal is affiliated to Princeton University where its editors-in-chief, Alexander Glaser, Zia Mian, and Pavel Podvig, are based. The journal is published in English accompanied by an integral translation into Russian.

== Abstracting and indexing ==
The journal is abstracted and indexed in:

- EBSCO databases
- Ei Compendex
- Emerging Sources Citation Index
- Inspec
- Metadex
- ProQuest databases
- Scopus
