= Shayrat =

Shayrat الشعيرات Sha'irat
- Village
- Location in Syria
- Coordinates: 34°29′34″N 36°56′47″E
- Country: Syria
- Governorate: Homs
- District: Homs
- Subdistrict: Al-Riqama

Population (2004)
  - Total: 1,443
- Time zone: UTC+2 (EET)
  - Summer (DST): UTC+3 (EEST)
- Area code: 031

Shayrat (Arabic: الشعيرات, romanized: ash-Shuʿayrāt, also spelled Sha'irat) is a village in central Syria, administratively part of the Homs Governorate, located southeast of Homs on the western fringes of the Syrian Desert. Nearby localities include Dardaghan to the west, al-Manzul and al-Riqama to the northwest, Sadad to the south and al-Hamrat to the southwest. According to the Central Bureau of Statistics (CBS), Shayrat had a population of 1,443 in the 2004 census. Shayrat had been classified as an abandoned village or khirba by English scholar Eli Smith in 1838.

Shayrat is near Shayrat Air Base.

== See also ==
- 2017 Shayrat missile strike

== Bibliography ==
- Smith, Eli; Robinson, Edward (1841). Biblical Researches in Palestine, Mount Sinai and Arabia Petraea: A Journal of Travels in the Year 1838. Vol. 3. Crocker and Brewster.
