= List of colleges and universities in New Hampshire =

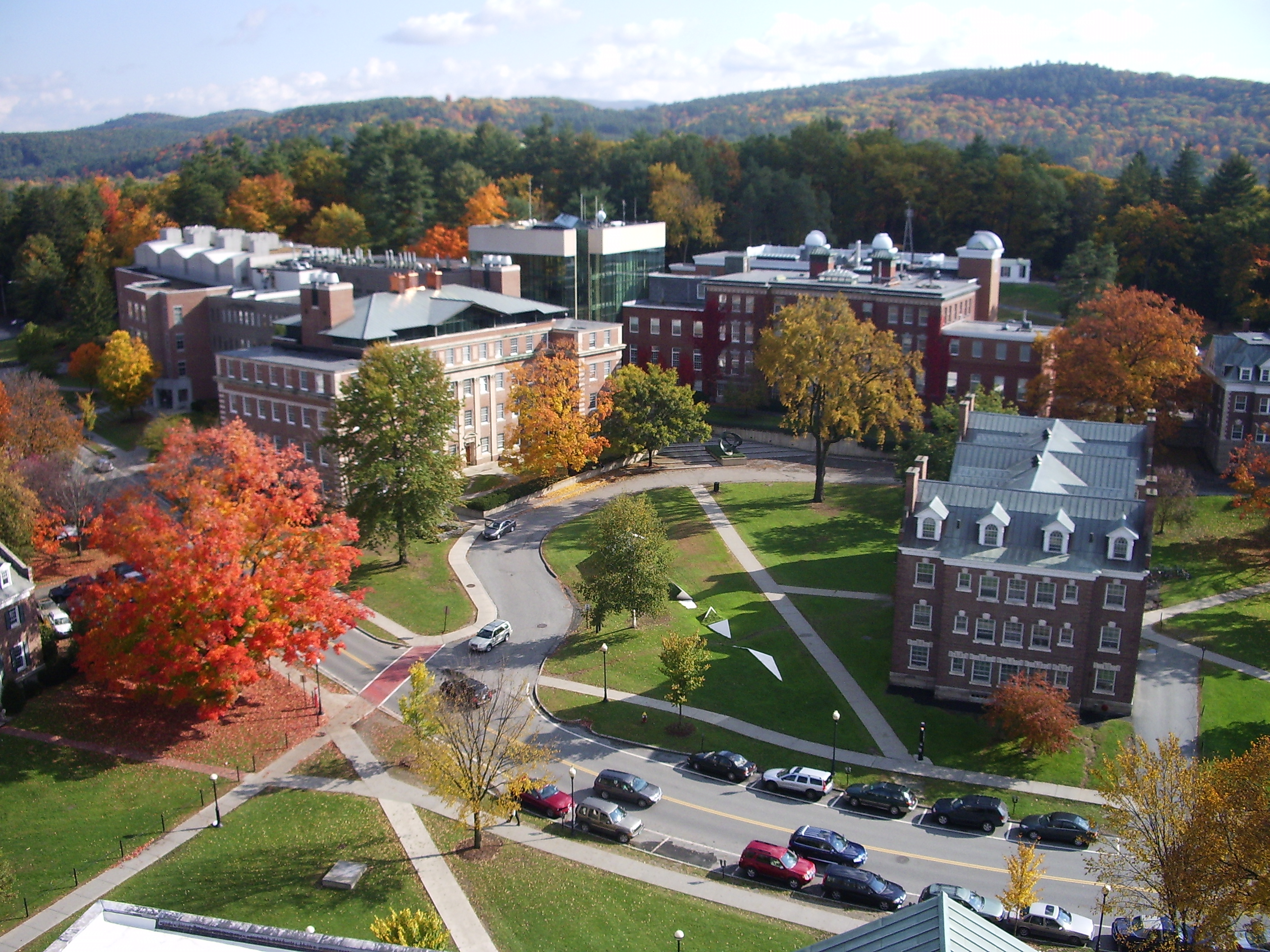
Dartmouth College, the only Ivy League institution in New Hampshire

This is a list of colleges and universities in the U.S. state of New Hampshire. For the purposes of this list, colleges and universities are defined as accredited,^{[a]} degree-granting, postsecondary institutions. Currently, there are several universities and one law school, as well as a number of undergraduate associates and baccalaureate colleges, operating in the state. In addition, one out of state institution offer courses and degrees at locations in New Hampshire, and twenty one academic institutions were formerly active in the state.

The state's three public universities are administered by the University System of New Hampshire. New Hampshire is also served by a network of seven public community colleges. The oldest school in the state is Dartmouth College, a member of the Ivy League and the only New Hampshire institution founded before the American Revolution. Enrollment sizes range from small liberal arts colleges with fewer than 100 students to the flagship state school, the University of New Hampshire in Durham, which has over 14,000 on-campus students, and up to Southern New Hampshire University, whose combined online and in-person enrollment is over 160,000.

The New Hampshire College & University Council is a consortium of 19 of the state's public and private institutions of higher education.

== Extant institutions ==
Institution	Location(s)	Control	Type^{[b]}	Enrollment	Founded
Great Bay Community College	Portsmouth	Public	Associates college	1,462	1945
Lakes Region Community College	Laconia	Public	Associates college	735	1967
Manchester Community College	Manchester	Public	Associates college	2,081	1945
Nashua Community College	Nashua	Public	Associates college	1,342	1970
NHTI, Concord's Community College	Concord	Public	Associates college	2,657	1965
River Valley Community College	Claremont, Keene and Lebanon	Public	Associates college	677	1968
White Mountains Community College	Berlin and Littleton	Public	Associates college	577	1966
Keene State College	Keene	Public	Master's university	2,848	1909
Plymouth State University	Plymouth	Public	Master's university	3,707	1871
University of New Hampshire	Durham^{[d]}	Public	Research university	13,554	1866
University of New Hampshire at Manchester	Manchester	Public	Baccalaureate college	2,141	1985
University of New Hampshire Franklin Pierce School of Law	Concord	Public	Law school	718	1973
Antioch University New England	Keene	Private	Master's university	992	1964
Colby-Sawyer College	New London	Private	Baccalaureate college	972	1837
Dartmouth College	Hanover	Private	Research university	6,938	1769
Franklin Pierce University	Rindge	Private	Master's university	1,654	1962
Hellenic American University	Nashua	Private	Not classified	324	2004
New England College	Henniker	Private	Master's university	3,275	1946
Rivier University	Nashua	Private (Catholic)	Master's university	2,777	1933
Saint Anselm College	Goffstown	Private (Catholic)	Baccalaureate college	2,111	1889
St. Joseph School of Nursing	Nashua	Private (Catholic)	Special-focus two-year institution	95	1908
Southern New Hampshire University	Manchester	Private	Master's university	189,531	1932
Thomas More College of Liberal Arts	Merrimack	Private (Catholic)	Baccalaureate college	97	1978
Upper Valley Educators Institute	Lebanon	Private	Not classified	51	2010

== Defunct institutions ==
Institution	Location(s)	Founded	Closed
American College of History & Legal Studies	Salem	2010	2015
Belknap College	Center Harbor	1963	1974
Canaan College	Canaan	1961	1973
Castle College	Windham	1963	1999
Chester College of New England	Chester	1965	2012
Concord College	Concord	1887	1973
Daniel Webster College	Nashua	1965	2017
Franconia College	Franconia	1963	1978
Granite State College	Nine locations^{[c]}	1972	2023
Gunstock College	Gilford	1965	1969
Lebanon College	Lebanon	1956	2014
Magdalen College of the Liberal Arts	Warner	1974	2024
McIntosh College	Dover	1896	2009
Mount Saint Mary College	Manchester/Hooksett	1893	1978
Mount Washington College	Manchester	1900	2016
Nathaniel Hawthorne College	Antrim	1962	1988
New Hampshire Institute of Art	Manchester	1898	2019
Notre Dame College	Manchester	1950	2002
Pierce College for Women	Concord	1951	1972
St. Anthony College	Hudson	1954	1979
St. John International University	Concord/Turin, Italy	2008	2014

== Out-of-state institutions ==
- Massachusetts College of Pharmacy and Health Sciences offers a Doctor of Pharmacy, Master of Physician Assistant Studies, Master of Science in Occupational Therapy, Master of Science in Nursing, and a post-baccalaureate Bachelor of Science in Nursing at its location in Manchester.

== Unaccredited institutions ==
Three schools are recognized by the state as a degree-granting institution, but have not been accredited by a recognized accrediting body:

The following institution has candidacy status with New England Commission of Higher Education and are seeking full accreditation:

- American University of Madaba — Concord, New Hamsphire

The following two institutions do not currently have candidacy status with New England Commission of Higher Education or any other recognized accrediting body:

- New England Aeronautical Institute - Portsmouth, NH
- Signum University - Bedford, New Hampshire

== See also ==
- Higher education in the United States
- List of college athletic programs in New Hampshire
- List of recognized higher education accreditation organizations
- Lists of American institutions of higher education
- Lists of universities and colleges
- Lists of universities and colleges by country

== Notes ==
- ^aTwo institutions are approved to operate in New Hampshire, but lacking academic accreditation: Signum University (which has announced its intent to seek accreditation) and the Upper Valley Educators Institute (which has candidacy status with the New England Commission of Higher Education).
- ^bThe types listed here are as categorized in the Carnegie Classification of Institutions of Higher Education.
- ^cThe nine locations were Claremont, Concord, Conway, Lebanon, Littleton, Manchester, Nashua, Portsmouth, and Rochester
- ^dThe University of New Hampshire School of Law is in Concord, another branch campus is in Manchester
