= Francis Snow =

Francis Snow may refer to:

- Francis H. Snow (1840–1908), American naturalist and educator
- Francis Marion Snow (1881–1927), American who murdered his wife, mother-in-law, and step-son
- Frank Snow (1941–2015), American politician, businessman, and government official in New Hampshire
