= Mount Saint Mary College (New Hampshire) =

Defunct Roman Catholic college for women

Coordinates: 43°05′34″N 71°27′03″W

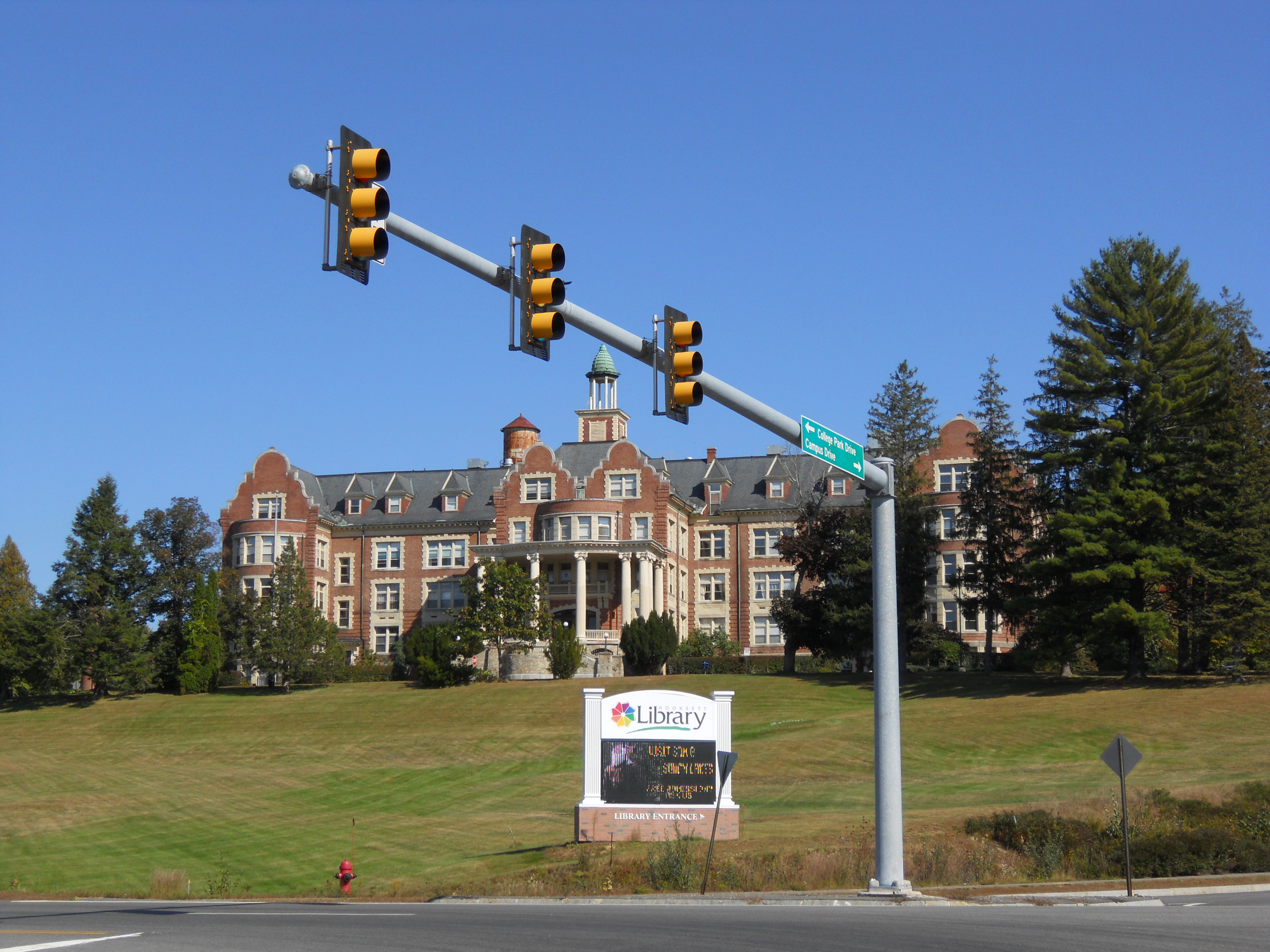
- Former Mercy Hall in 2014
- Type: Private
- Active: 1893–1978
- Affiliations: Catholic Church (Sisters of Mercy)
- Location: Hooksett, New Hampshire, United States
- Campus: Suburban 550 acres (2.2 km^{2})

Mount Saint Mary College in Hooksett, New Hampshire, was a Catholic college for women founded in 1934 by the Sisters of Mercy. The college was situated on a 550-acre (220 ha) campus approximately 60 miles (97 km) northwest of Boston. It ceased operations in 1978 due to the increasing trend away from single sex higher education which in turn led to a decline in enrollment from a high of about 500 students to just under 200 at the time of the closing. This decline eventually was the cause of financial difficulties from which the school never recovered.

== Academic offerings ==
Mount Saint Mary offered baccalaureate degrees in biology, business, dietetics, early childhood education, elementary education, English, French, history, home economics, mathematics, nursing (in conjunction with Catholic Medical Center, a Sisters of Mercy-affiliated hospital in nearby Manchester), secondary education (in accordance with a specific major), social welfare, Spanish and special education. Associate's degrees were conferred in business, early childhood education, home economics and social welfare.

The college was one of eight founding members of the New Hampshire College & University Council, which today is a 23-member consortium of two-year and four-year institutions of higher learning in New Hampshire that engage in such cooperative practices as cross-registration, cultural and social exchanges, interlibrary lending, and joint research projects and symposiums. For many years, "The Mount" functioned as the sister school of the formerly all-male Saint Anselm College in Goffstown, New Hampshire, and the two institutions carried on a particularly close academic and social affiliation.

== Campus ==
The campus of Mount Saint Mary was dominated by Mercy Hall, a five-level (one below ground, four above ground) former mansion featuring white Italian marble as well as mahogany and oak interiors purchased in 1909 by the Sisters of Mercy from the prominent Galt family. The already existing Mount Saint Mary Academy, a preparatory school for girls, was relocated here, ultimately transitioning into college status in 1934. Throughout the existence of the school, this building housed nearly all academic and administrative facilities as well as several auditoriums, a ballroom, a chapel, a dining hall, a gymnasium, and dormitory rooms for resident students.

Separate buildings constructed in the early 1960s included McAuley Library (which at the time of closing contained approximately 40,000 volumes and 400 periodical subscriptions) and a resident student complex consisting of three dormitory buildings interconnected to a central student union building. At the northwest edge of the campus was a turn of the century colonial style house that served as the convent for the Sisters of Mercy. There were also about half a dozen smaller structures that served various auxiliary purposes for the college community.

Approximately 350 students could be accommodated in the college residence facilities.

== Other institutions for women in New Hampshire ==
At one point, Mount Saint Mary was one of seven all-female institutions of higher education in the state of New Hampshire. Only two of these still exist, and have since become coeducational: Colby–Sawyer College (New London) and Rivier College (Nashua), the latter a Catholic school operated by the Sisters of the Presentation of Mary.

The other four, along with Mount Saint Mary, have ceased operations: Castle College (Windham), a two-year school that was also operated by the Sisters of Mercy; Notre Dame College (Manchester), a four-year school operated by the Sisters of the Holy Cross; Pierce College for Women (Concord), a two-year school, and Stoneleigh College (Rye), also a two-year school. Castle and Notre Dame both became fully coeducational, but even this policy could not sustain their existence.

== Closing of the college ==
It remains speculative as to whether Mount Saint Mary could have done anything in order to preserve itself as an institution of higher education.

Most of the all-female schools in New Hampshire that closed offered only two-year programs of study, and were simply unable to compete with the greater resources and less expensive tuition offered by nearby community colleges. For its part, Notre Dame College, the other four-year school that closed, was not saved by coeducation because its campus was completely hemmed in by private homes in a residential neighborhood, thereby precluding any opportunities to expand its buildings and resources.

Mount Saint Mary did not have such a problem with its sprawling campus of 550 acres (2.2 km^{2}), some of which it could have sold off as a means of stabilizing its finances, as most of the land was unoccupied. However, unlike Rivier College, which not only adopted coeducation but also created baccalaureate as well as master's degree programs in such fields as administration and management, communications, computer science and technology, fine arts, and additional health science fields which could be pursued during the days, evenings and weekends, Mount Saint Mary remained a traditional undergraduate day college for women with degree programs focused only on the liberal arts, nursing and teacher education. In effect, some would argue that the school in many ways had made itself demographically obsolete.

Others have claimed that in contrast to Notre Dame and Rivier colleges, which were operated by less prestigious Catholic orders and whose students tended to be the daughters of local working-class families, Mount Saint Mary was operated by the Sisters of Mercy (who are often compared to the male Jesuit order as the great educators in the Catholic world), while its students were more often the daughters of upper-middle-class families primarily from the Boston metropolitan area. Consequently, the school would steadfastly resist abandoning its genteel image and traditions for the sake of survival, and in May 1978, after 44 years of educating young women, Mount Saint Mary graduated its final class of students.

== After closure ==
For nearly three years, the college property was placed on the market for sale. In 1981, New Hampshire College (now Southern New Hampshire University), a private institution in Manchester, purchased the land to serve as its North Campus. Throughout the rest of the decade, the North Campus housed all graduate programs for the college, as well as the undergraduate program in human services and the English as a Second Language program for international students.

However, by the early 1990s, New Hampshire College, preparing to assume university status, decided to consolidate all its programs at its main site in Manchester, and the property was once again placed on the open market.

Following its purchase by a group of private investors, what was once the campus of Mount Saint Mary College has since taken on a diversity of functions:

- Mercy Hall is now a luxury apartment complex, and the building is aptly named the Mount Saint Mary Apartments.
- McAuley Library now serves as the public library for the town of Hooksett, and the convent is once again a private residence.
- One of the auxiliary buildings is now a day care and early childhood education center, another is a private residence, one has been demolished, and another functions as the maintenance and security headquarters for the apartment complex.
- The resident student complex had long fallen into neglect and disrepair after New Hampshire College sold the campus, and has since been demolished.
- Portions of the original 550 acres have been developed for commercial and residential housing purposes.

Today, Mount Saint Mary alumnae maintain an active association, including a frequently accessed Facebook site. Alumnae reunions are held on the campus of Saint Anselm College simultaneously with the reunions of that institution.
