= Corey Olsen =

American educator and podcaster

- Born: August 16, 1974 (age 52); New Hampshire, U.S.
- Other name: Tolkien Professor
- Occupations: Teacher, podcaster
- Years active: 2004–present
- Awards: Phi Beta Kappa

Academic background
- Education: Columbia University

Academic work
- Discipline: J.R.R. Tolkien, medieval literature
- Institutions: Temple University; Columbia University; Nyack College; Washington College; Mythgard Institute; Signum University
- Website: tolkienprofessor.com

Corey Olsen (born August 16, 1974), also known as the "Tolkien Professor", is an American teacher and podcaster, best known for his work in new media promoting the works of J.R.R. Tolkien and medieval literature. Formerly a professor at Washington College, Olsen began dedicating his time to Signum University, an online learning facility he founded in 2011. He is the author of the 2012 book Exploring J.R.R. Tolkien's The Hobbit.

The Tolkien scholar Jason Fisher called Olsen "a great popularizer of Tolkien, both in and outside the classroom", while The Washington Post described him as "one of the most popular medievalists in America".

== Early life and education ==
Corey Olsen was born on August 16, 1974, in New Hampshire. The "bookish" son of a construction worker, Olsen cannot remember when he first read The Hobbit (1937), although The Washington Post cites it as age eight. Olsen obtained his B.A. in English and astrophysics from Williams College in 1996. He went on to Columbia University, where he took all the medieval courses he could, obtaining his M.A. in 1997, his MPhil in 2000, and his PhD in medieval literature in 2003.

== Academic career ==
=== Teaching and writing ===
After graduating, Olsen began teaching positions at Temple University, Columbia University, and Nyack College. He then became assistant professor of English at Washington College, with a specialty on J.R.R. Tolkien, Arthurian literature, Geoffrey Chaucer, and Thomas Malory. In 2007, he won the college's teaching award, and from 2008 to 2009, he published an article and review in the journal Tolkien Studies. Olsen released the book Exploring J.R.R. Tolkien's The Hobbit in September 2012. He wrote it out of the feeling that The Hobbit was often overshadowed by The Lord of The Rings (1954–1955), or dismissed as a "simple, childish prequel".

=== Website and podcasting ===
In spring 2007, Olsen began The Tolkien Professor website and uploaded the 28-minute introductory lecture "How to Read Tolkien and Why". He felt that the site would not constrain his thoughts to academia, explaining, "which most people will never read". The site began generating traffic in summer 2009, when he began The Tolkien Professor podcast and released the lecture as an episode. The podcast garnered over a quarter of a million downloads in its first year, and had reached a million by early 2011. By then, it contained 78 episodes discussing Middle-earth topics ranging from dragons and orcs, to food. Once "the people who were listening wanted to talk", he began a discussion board on the website, and invited his fanbase to "Tolkien Chat" call-in sessions through Skype. Otherwise, Olsen has published several of his Washington College courses; one titled "Faerie and Fantasy" covers Middle English works like Sir Orfeo, Sir Launfal, and The Wedding of Sir Gawain and Dame Ragnelle. The Washington Post likened Olsen to public intellectuals such as Noam Chomsky, Umberto Eco, and Stephen Jay Gould, but one comfortable in the new media. Alongside Maggie Parke, Olsen also held the weekly YouTube series Rings & Realms, where he unpacked each episode of the television adaptation The Rings of Power (2022).

=== Online education ===
In 2011, Olsen founded the Mythgard Institute, a center for the advancement of Tolkien research, as well as Signum University, a nonprofit organization which offers online courses on sci-fi and fantasy literature. He began the university out of the potential he had seen in online seminars and his dissatisfaction with high tuition rates. Olsen states that it has become possible to carry out almost all traditional classroom teaching over the Internet, and that he finds online interaction with students "very satisfying". In 2013, he left his job at Washington College to focus on Mythgard and Signum full-time. At the university, Olsen has led classes and has held weekly programs dissecting Tolkien's books. In his teaching, he claims his leadership approach is based on Aragorn's confidence, Gandalf's good nature, and Sam's humility and failthfulness. In 2018, Olsen announced that Signum University was to be formally entered for state certification via the New Hampshire Department of Education. Following some days of crowdfunding, they raised the over $23,000 required, and later in 2018, they began the process. In 2019, the New Hampshire Department of Education accepted Signum University's request to do business in the state.

== Reception ==
=== Books ===
The Tolkien scholar Jason Fisher, reviewing Exploring J.R.R. Tolkien's The Hobbit for Tolkien Studies, called Olsen "a great popularizer of Tolkien, both in and outside the classroom, for which he deserves the Tolkien community's gratitude and congratulations". Fisher described the book as informal and approachable, without academic apparatus, and almost relentlessly thorough. He found it "occasionally insightful", though without providing the "original new reading" promised on the cover. To him, it seemed to be "a crib" for undergraduates or high school pupils studying The Hobbit, offering a "ready-made study guide" for the student and a ready-made lesson plan for the teacher.

Ethan Gilsdorf, writing in The Boston Globe, describes Exploring J.R.R. Tolkien's The Hobbit as bringing "a more expanded consciousness" to a reading of Tolkien's novel, with "erudite discussion of the major ideas" in what he calls "this deceptively simple children's book". He notes that Olsen covers such topics as "Bilbo's split personality — reserved vs. adventuresome", an attribute that in his view "drives much of his action". Gilsdorf sums up Olsen's book as "indispensable". Steve Larson, in the Deseret News, describes the book as a companion volume, offering insight into the characters and writing. Kirkus Reviews states that Olsen gives a chapter-by-chapter account of the elements of the novel, including the way Bilbo's character develops through his adventures. Jennie Ramstad, in The Georgia Straight, finds that given the amount of detail in the analysis, the book works best as a companion, "read alongside The Hobbit itself". USA Today notes Olsen's comment that The Hobbit "can be read on an adult level" because of its discussion of evil and the question of fate versus free will, and his exhortation "Don't skip the songs! They will tell you so much about the characters".

=== Podcasts ===
In The Washington Post, Daniel de Vise notes that the million downloads of Olsen's podcasts made 'The Tolkien Professor' "one of the most popular medievalists in America". He called Olsen's use of "a smartly branded [website] and a legion of iTunes listeners" an unusual route to success, but certainly unlike the traditional "publish-or-perish" track for scholars seeking tenure. In his view, Olsen was "a new breed of public intellectual" who grew up around computers, and "took up a sort of permanent spiritual residence within Tolkien's imagined Middle-earth". He cites a follower of Olsen's podcasts, Dave Kale, as saying "He is a fantastic lecturer. He's engaging. He draws you in", adding that it costs over $44,000 per year to study at Washington College, but Olsen is effectively giving part of that education away for nothing with his online lectures, which are not peer-reviewed. Despite that, the college gave Olsen tenure in 2010, something that de Vise called "unusual for a scholar who hasn't published a book".

== Publications ==
- Olsen, Corey (2008). "The Myth of the Ent and the Entwife". Tolkien Studies. 5: 39–53. doi:10.1353/tks.0.0013. ISBN 978-1-938228-55-1. S2CID 170427932.
- ————— (2009). "Myth and Magic: Art according to the Inklings (review)". Tolkien Studies. 6: 277–283. doi:10.1353/tks.0.0052. ISBN 978-1-938228-57-5. S2CID 170757153.
- ————— (2012). Exploring J.R.R. Tolkien's The Hobbit. Houghton Mifflin Harcourt. ISBN 978-0-547-73946-5. OCLC 772100935.
- ————— (2013). "Adulterated love: the tragedy of Malory's Lancelot and Guinevere". In Jesmok, Janet; Hanks, Dorrel Thomas (eds.). Malory and Christianity: essays on Sir Thomas Malory's Morte d'Arthur. Studies in Medieval Culture. Vol. 51. Medieval Institute Publications, Western Michigan University. p. 214. ISBN 978-1580441759.
