= First Nations Development Institute =

Nonprofit organization in the United States

- Founder: Rebecca Adamson
- Type: 501(c)(3) Nonprofit Organization
- Purpose: Technical assistance and training, advocacy and policy, and direct grantmaking to benefit Native American projects, organizations, and communities.
- Headquarters: Longmont, Colorado
- Key people: Michael E. Roberts, Jackie Francke, Raymond Foxworth
- Website: firstnations.org
- Formerly called: First Nations Financial Project

First Nations Development Institute (First Nations) is a nonprofit organization that assists Native American tribes, their communities, and Native nonprofits in economic development by providing technical assistance, training, policy, and the awarding of grants. Public education is another area of focus. It is based in Longmont, Colorado. Charity Navigator gave First Nations Development Institute a four-star rating.

== Mission ==
The mission of First Nations is to strengthen American Indian economies to support healthy Native communities. First Nations invest in and create innovative institutions and models that strengthen asset control and support economic development for American Indian people and their communities.

== Guiding principle ==
"We believe that Native peoples hold the capacity and ingenuity to ensure the sustainable, economic, spiritual and cultural well-being of their communities." The organization's slogan is "Strengthening Native American Communities & Economies."

== History ==
First Nations Financial Project was founded in 1980 in Fredericksburg, Virginia, by Rebecca Adamson. In 1991 it was renamed as First Nations Development Institute.

First Nations Development Institute's methods seek answers from within Native American communities as opposed to imposing solutions from the outside. First Nations Development Institute's projects "build on a tribe's unique culture and resources at hand to work toward a more stable economic future." Interviewed for the Fredericksburg, Virginia, Free-Lance Star in 1995, Adamson said: "I want to show the brilliance, the creativity, the efficacy of Indian people."

In 1985, First Nations Development Institute and the Oglala Lakota College helped to support the creation of Lakota Funds, the first Native American Community Development Financial Institution on a reservation.

The Oweesta Program was created in 1986 as a model of a Community Development Financial Institution in Native American communities. First Nations Development Institute is its parent organization.

The Tribal Commerce and Enterprise Management Program (TCEMP), which provided support for Native American students to pursue graduate degrees in business, was launched in 1985 at Yale University's School of Organization and Management. In 1991 it moved to University of Minnesota's Carlson School of Management.

In 1994 to 1995 First Nations Development Institute continued to expand is work in reservation economies through the Eagle Staff Fund.

First Peoples Worldwide was founded in 1997 as a project of First Nations Development Institute.

In 2001, First Nations Development Institute and the Fannie Mae Foundation, released the Building Native Communities: Financial Skills for Families, a jointly developed, culturally relevant curriculum on building financial skills.

The Native Agriculture and Food Systems Initiative (NAFSI) was launched in 2002, with funding support from the W.K. Kellogg Foundation. It was intended to assess food systems in tribal communities.

In 2002, Rebecca Adamson wrote an opinion piece criticizing the use of Native American mascots by professional, university, and lower school sports teams.

Michael E. Roberts rejoined First Nations in 2003 and was named president of First Nations Development Institute in 2005.

In 2006, First Nations Development Institute moved its headquarters from Virginia to Longmont, Colorado.

The Native American Asset Watch: Rethinking Asset-Building in Indian Country report was published in 2009 to report on who controls the assets of tribal communities and the implications for their economies.

The first Native Food Sovereignty Summit was co-hosted in 2013 by First Nations Development Institute, Intertribal Agriculture Council, the Oneida Nation, and Northeast Wisconsin Technical College.

First Nations Development Institute's 35th Anniversary and the 20th Annual L.E.A.D.(Leadership, Entrepreneurial and Apprenticeship Development) Conference were held in 2015.

In 2016, Raymond Foxworth wrote an opinion piece in response to a Washington Post poll that found the great majority of Native Americans were not offended by the Washington Redskins name.

First Nations Development Institute and Echo Hawk Consulting received funding from the W.K. Kellogg Foundation for Reclaiming Native Truth: A Project to Dispel America's Myths and Misconceptions.

In 2017, GuideStar gave First Nations Development Institute a Platinum Participant rating.

In 2017, BBB Wise Giving Alliance featured Michael Roberts, First Nations Development Institute President and CEO, on their BBB's Give.org Building Trust Series YouTube channel.

In 2022, Charity Navigator gave First Nations Development Institute a 4-star rating, for the 11th year in a row.
