= Aaron W. Sawyer =

American judge (1818–1882)

Aaron Worcester Sawyer (October 17, 1818 – August 23, 1882) was an American judge and politician who was a justice of the New Hampshire Supreme Court from 1876 to 1877.

Born in Mont Vernon, New Hampshire, to Aaron F. Sawyer, his parents moved to Nashua, New Hampshire, when Sawyer was eleven. He attended public schools in Nashua, Hancock and other academies, and received a Master of Arts from Dartmouth College. He studied law with his father and was admitted to the Hillsborough County bar In 1844. He first practiced with his father, and in 1849 partnered with G. C. Atherton, with whom he continued until 1858, when he was obliged to leave the business due to ill health. He later partnered with General A. F. Stevens, and continued with him for about fifteen years. During his career, he also represented Nashua in the New Hampshire House of Representatives and the New Hampshire Senate, and served as mayor of Nashua.

In 1876, Sawyer was appointed to the state supreme court, which position he held for one year, when be was compelled to resign on account of failing health. Sawyer had been in poor health for several years, due to a complication of diseases, but his death was hastened by gangrene, which set in some months before. He was survived by his wife and two children.

== See also ==
- List of mayors of Nashua, New Hampshire

Political offices
Preceded by Isaac W. Smith	Justice of the New Hampshire Supreme Court; 1876–1877	Succeeded by Isaac W. Smith
