= Rebecca Adamson =

American businessperson and activist

Rebecca L. Adamson
- Born: 1950 (age 75–76); Akron, Ohio, United States
- Citizenship: American
- Education: Southern New Hampshire University
- Occupations: Businesswoman, advocate
- Known for: Founding First Peoples Worldwide

Rebecca Adamson (born 1950) is an American businessperson and advocate. She is former director, former president, and founder of First Nations Development Institute and the founder of First Peoples Worldwide.

== Personal life ==
Rebecca L. Adamson was born in Akron, Ohio. Her Learning to Give biography states, "Though her mother was Cherokee, her father was of Swedish descent." Adamson grew up in Akron and spent summers with her relatives in Lumberton, North Carolina, where she learned about the history and culture of Native Americans. The Free Lance-Star in Fredericksburg, Virginia, stated that she is a "member of the Eastern Band of Cherokee Indians" in 2004. Tayna H. Lee described Adamson as being of the Cherokee Nation in 2016.

She holds a master of science in economic development from the Southern New Hampshire University in Manchester, New Hampshire, where she teaches a graduate course on Indigenous economics.

== Career ==
After graduating from Firestone High School in Akron in 1967, she studied philosophy at the University of Akron and then took courses in law and economics at Piedmont College in Georgia. Adamson left college in 1970 to work on western reservations to help end the practice of removing Native American children from their homes and placing them in government or missionary-ran boarding schools in the hope of destroying their connections to their native languages and cultures.

From 1972 to 1976, she was a member of the board of directors of Denver, Colorado's Coalition of Indian-Controlled School Boards, where she worked toward synthesizing and facilitating policy reform at the national level. The Coalition worked to "wrest control of Indian schools from the U.S. government and Christian religious groups that had been running them for more than 100 years." Her work contributed to the Indian Self-Determination Act of 1975.

In 1982, she became founder and president of First Nations Development Institute in Falmouth, Virginia, to promote economic development by founding commercial enterprises on reservations. In 1986, she served as an adviser on rural development for the United Nations (UN) during their Decade of Women. She became the adviser for the UN's International Labor Organization International Indigenous Rights from 1988 to 1989. She has also served on the board of directors for the National Center for Enterprise Development and the Council on Foundations.

In 1992, she became an adviser for the Catholic Conference's Campaign for Human Development. She has also served on the President's Council on Sustainable Development/Sustainable Communities Task Force.

Her work led to the first microloan fund in the United States associated with a reservation, the first tribal investment model. This was a national movement for reservation land reform, and legislation on federal trust responsibility for Native Americans.

Adamson's international work created the Lumba Aboriginal Community Foundation in Australia. It enabled the Sans Tribe to secure its traditional homelands in Botswana, Namibia, and southern Africa. She launched a strategy (that includes Alcoa, Texaco, Rio Tinto, Merck, Ford, and Occidental) with investment criteria that protect the rights of indigenous peoples and has been adopted by a mutual fund, an index fund, and investment advisors.

She established a scholarship program for native people at the Yale School of Organization and Management and at the Carlson School of Management at the University of Minnesota. She convinced the World Bank to create the First Global Indigenous Peoples' Facility Fund to make small building grants.

She was appointed by the Obama administration to serve a three-year term on the U.S. Extractive Industries Transparency Initiative Advisory Committee to increase the transparency in the reporting on natural resource extraction.

Adamson serves on the board of directors for the Calvert Social Investment Fund and the Calvert Small Cap Fund which are known for socially-responsible investing and co-founded a fund there. She is on the board and trustee for Tom's of Maine, Inc. She is on the boards of Corporation for Enterprise Development, The Bay Foundation, Josephine Bay Paul and C. Michael Paul Foundation, The Bridgespan Group, and First Voice International. She is a founding member of Native Americans in Philanthropy, Funders Who Fund Native Americans, and International Funders for Indigenous Peoples. She has been a member of the editorial boards of Indian Country Today, Native Americas, and for Akwe:kon Journal.

In 2016, the Standing Rock Sioux asked her to develop and coordinate an investor engagement strategy to pressure the builders of the Dakota Access Pipeline to change the planned route which was to pass near a river used for potable water near their reservation. She was able to secure statements from ESG investors with over $1.7 trillion in invested assets requesting that the banks funding the pipeline support the tribe's request to reroute the pipeline. Her efforts helped to embolden activists who forced shareholder resolutions to require that the environmental and social risks were more adequately disclosed (including at Marathon Petroleum, Enbridge, and Wells Fargo) and encouraged over 500 NGOs to pressure the banks financing the pipeline with three major banks pulling out of the syndication (BNP Paribas, DNB ASA, and ING) and ten other banks supported strengthening the Equator Principles.

== Awards ==
In 1996, she was awarded the Robert W. Scrivner Award from the Council on Foundations for grant-making and the National Center for American Indian Enterprise Development's Jay Silverheels Award. Ms. magazine named her one of their seven "Women of the Year" in 1997. In 1998, Who Cares magazine named her one of the top 10 Social Entrepreneurs of the Year. In 2001 she was received the John W. Gardener Leadership Award. In 2004, she was Scwab's Outstanding Social Entrepreneur.

In 2012, she was featured as one of the most influential women in America on PBS' MAKERS: Women Who Make America program.

She writes a monthly column for Indian Country Today newspaper. When asked about her accomplishments in 2015, she said, "I come from a matrilineal society and having women be a source of power was there in my DNA."

== Publications ==
- "Adapting the Evaluation Process to the Organizational Culture," a chapter in Evaluation with Power, 1997
- "The Native American Credit Market: Opportunity Knocks, but Relationships Stay," RMA's Journal of Lending & Credit Risk Management, Fall 1997
- "Can't Give It Away Fast Enough? Try This," Foundation News & Commentary, January/February 1998
- The Color of Wealth – The Story behind the U.S. Racial Wealth Divide, June 2006
