= Jim Donchess =

American politician from New Hampshire

51st and 56th Mayor of Nashua
- Incumbent
- Assumed office January 10, 2016
- Preceded by: Donnalee Lozeau
- In office 1984–1992

Personal details
- Party: Democratic
- Education: Yale University (BA); New York University (JD)

Jim Donchess is an American attorney and politician serving as the 56th mayor of Nashua, New Hampshire since 2016. He also was the 51st mayor of Nashua. Although the position is non-partisan, he is a registered Democrat.

== Education ==
Donchess graduated from Yale University with a major in Art history, then earned a Juris Doctor from the New York University School of Law.

== Career ==
After practicing as an attorney for a number of years, Donchess first served as the 51st mayor of Nashua from 1984 to 1992. During his tenure, Nashua was recognized by Money magazine as the "Best Place to Live in America." Donchess left office to run unsuccessfully for the United States House of Representatives in 1992. He later returned to his private legal practice. 24 years in later, he ran for mayor again, against Chris Williams, and won, becoming the 56th mayor of Nashua.

Donchess ran on a platform of improving infrastructure, working to end the opioid crisis, and clean energy.

== See also ==
- List of mayors of Nashua, New Hampshire

== Official website ==
- Official website
