= Nashua Airport =

Nashua Airport Boire Field

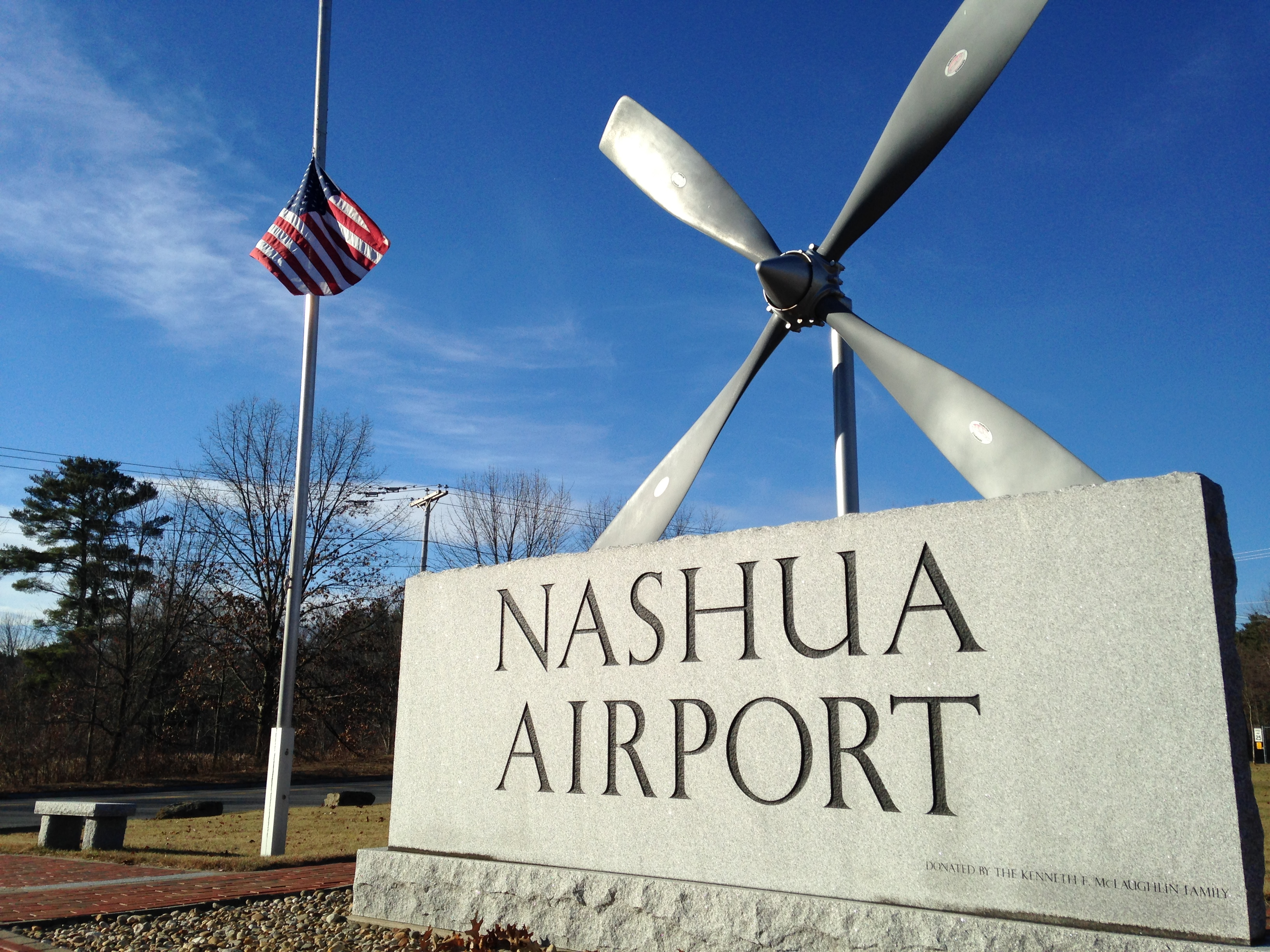
- Sign at the entrance to the airport
- IATA: ASH; ICAO: KASH; FAA LID: ASH

Summary
- Airport type: Public
- Owner: Nashua Airport Authority
- Serves: Nashua, New Hampshire
- Elevation AMSL: 200 ft / 61 m
- Coordinates: 42°46′54″N 071°30′53″W
- Website: nashuaairport.com

Maps
- FAA airport diagram
- Interactive map of Nashua Airport

Runways
Direction	Length		Surface
Direction	ft	m	Surface
14/32	6,000	1,829	Asphalt

Statistics (2022)
- Aircraft operations (year ending 10/1/2022): 58,726
- Based aircraft: 228
- Sources: FAA and airport website

Nashua Airport at Boire Field (IATA: ASH, ICAO: KASH, FAA LID: ASH) is a public-use airport located three nautical miles (6 km) northwest of the central business district of Nashua, a city in Hillsborough County, New Hampshire, United States. Owned by the Nashua Airport Authority, It is included in the Federal Aviation Administration (FAA) National Plan of Integrated Airport Systems for 2017–2021, in which it is categorized as a national reliever airport facility.

== History ==
The airport dates back to 1934, when the city of Nashua bought a small existing airport that lacked a hangar and had a grass runway. Over the next several years Nashua, with federal aid, paved the 2,000-foot (610 m) runway and constructed buildings. The hangar was constructed from bricks reused from a Nashua factory that burned in 1930 during the Crown Hill Fire.

In 1943, the airport was named Boire Field after Ensign Paul Boire, Nashua's first casualty in World War II.

The Nashua Airport Authority was established to oversee the airport in 1961. The New England Aeronautical Institute was founded at the airport in 1965. The institute's Daniel Webster Junior College division was founded in 1967. In 1978, the schools merged to form the Daniel Webster College (DWC). Nashua Airport became one of the busiest airports in New England in terms of take-offs and landings due to its use by DWC for flight training, though the program was ended in 2010.

The airport's control tower was built in 1972. The airport was one of the first to operate with a non-federal control tower in the early 1990s. Contract towers such as the one at Boire Field are common today.

In 2012, runway 14-32 was moved 300 feet (91 m) to the northeast and extended by 500 feet (150 m), to 6,000 feet (1,800 m) to accommodate larger corporate jets. The runway officially opened on August 31, 2012. The original runway was removed. Many taxiways to the new runway were rebuilt during the construction.

In 2016, Southern New Hampshire University (SNHU) agreed to absorb the DWC's faculty and academic programs after its parent company ITT Tech declared bankruptcy. SNHU placed the winning bid for DWC's flight center, tower building, and hangar, and the university is exploring the viability of reviving DWC's former flight training program.

== Facilities and aircraft ==
Boire Field covers an area of 400 acres (160 ha) at an elevation of 200 feet (61 m) above mean sea level. It has one runway designated 14/32 with an asphalt surface measuring 6,000 by 100 feet (1,829 by 30 m).

For the 12-month period ending October 1, 2022, the airport had 58,726 aircraft operations, an average of 161 per day: 100% general aviation, <1% air taxi, and <1% military. At that time there were 228 aircraft based at this airport: 184 single-engine, 24 multi-engine, 11 jet, and 9 helicopter.

There is space for 441 aircraft located on the field. Air Traffic Control is at the airport from 7 a.m. until 9 p.m. It has no scheduled commercial service.

== Airport services ==
The airport has private flight schools offering training and certification in fixed-wing airplanes and helicopters. On-demand air charter is offered by providers, including Air Direct Airways and Infinity Aviation, which operates a number of Hawker mid-sized business jet aircraft.

Infinity Aviation Services is a fixed-base operator (FBO) that provides aircraft servicing, fueling and maintenance and flight planning resources. GFW Aeroservices, a former FBO, ceased operation in March 2011.

The second-floor Midfield Cafe is open for breakfast and lunch from 7 a.m. to 2 p.m., five days a week, closed on Mondays and Tuesdays.

The airport hosts the Southern New Hampshire University Aviation Center, Aviation Operations Management Program, and an accelerated Flight Program.

== See also ==
- List of airports in New Hampshire
