= List of mayors of Nashua, New Hampshire =

Mayors of the city of Nashua, New Hampshire, USA

The following is a list of mayors of the city of Nashua, New Hampshire, USA.

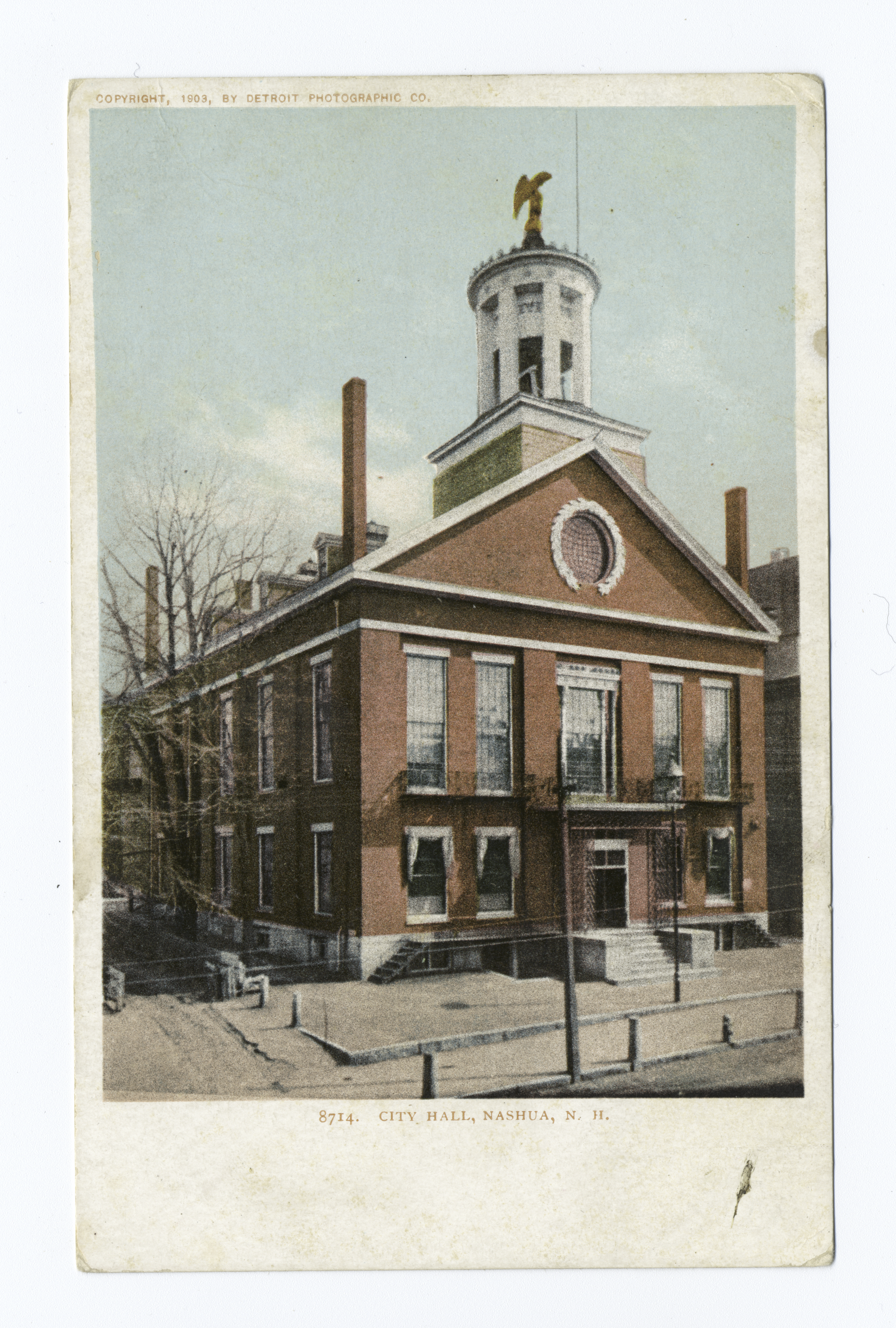
Nashua City Hall building in New Hampshire, USA, circa 1903

- Joseph Baldwin, 1853-1854
- Freeman S. Rogers, 1855-1856
- Thomas W. Gillis, 1857
- Albin Beard, 1858-1859
- Aaron W. Sawyer, 1860
- George Bowers, 1861
- Hiram T. Morrill, 1862-1863
- Edward Spalding, 1864
- Virgil C. Gilman, 1865
- Gilman Scripture, 1866-1867
- George Bowers, 1868
- Jotham D. Otterson, 1869-1870
- Dana Sargent, 1871
- Seth D. Chandler, 1872
- Frank A. McKean, 1873-1874
- George H. Whitney, 1875
- Charles Williams, 1876-1877
- William H. Cook, 1878
- Charles Holman, 1879-1880
- Benjamin Fletcher, Jr, 1881-1882
- Alfred M. Norton, 1883-1884
- John A. Spalding, 1885
- James H. Tolles, 1886-1888
- Charles H. Burke, 1889-1890
- William H. Beasom, 1891-1892
- Williams Hall, 1893
- Thomas Sands, 1894
- Joseph W. Howard, 1895-1896
- Jason E. Tolles, 1897-1900
- Milton A. Taylor, 1901-1902
- Jeremiah J. Doyle, 1903-1904
- Andros B. Jones, 1905-1906
- Albert Shedd, 1907-1910
- William H. Barry, 1911-1914
- James B. Crowley, 1915-1919
- Henri A. Burque, 1920-1923
- Eaton D. Sargent, 1924-1927
- William F. Sullivan, 1928-1933
- Alvin A. Lucier, 1934-1937
- Frank A. McMaster, 1938-1939
- Eugene A. Lemay, 1939-1945
- Oswald S. Maynard, 1946-1949
- Hugh Gregg, 1950
- Claude E. Nichols, 1951
- Lester H. Burnham, 1952-1957
- Mario J. Vagge, 1958-1965
- Dennis J. Sullivan, 1966-1977
- Donald C. Davidson, 1977
- Maurice L. Arel, 1977-1984
- Thomas J. Leonard, 1984
- Jim Donchess, 1984–1991, 2016–present
- Rob Wagner, 1992-1995
- Donald C. Davidson, ca.1996
- Bernard A. Streeter ca.2000
- Donnalee Lozeau, 2007–2015

== See also ==
- Nashua history
