= Daniel Webster College =

Private college in Nashua, New Hampshire, US (1965–2017)

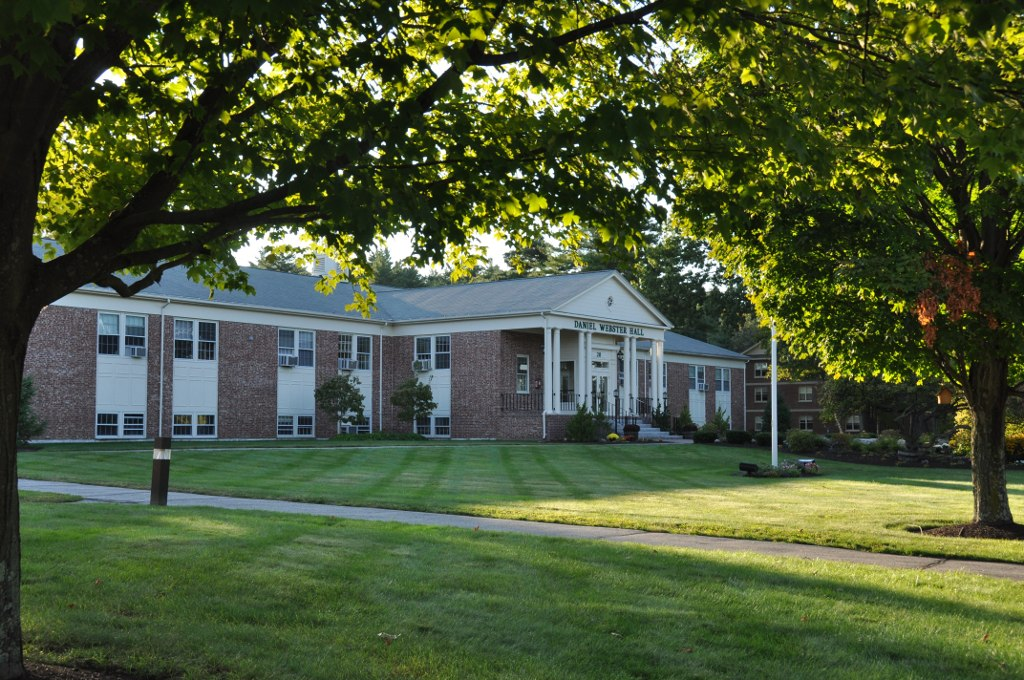
- Daniel Webster Hall
- Motto: "Veritas Humanitatis Dignitas"
- Type: Private college (non-profit) (1965–2009); Private college (for-profit) (2009–2017)
- Active: 1965–2017; 9 years ago
- Location: Nashua, New Hampshire, U.S. 42°46′37″N 071°30′52″W
- Campus: 54 acres (22 ha); Suburban
- Colors: (Blue and red)
- Nickname: Eagles
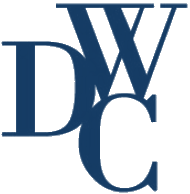

Daniel Webster College (DWC) was a private college in Nashua, New Hampshire, United States. It operated from 1965 through 2017 and had a strong aeronautics focus during much of its history. It was a nonprofit college until 2009, when ITT Educational Services, Inc. bought it and converted it to a for-profit model. ITT declared bankruptcy in September 2016. It was operated through the 2016–17 academic year by Southern New Hampshire University, after which the college was closed. Academic records and transcripts are maintained and available via the New Hampshire Department of Education.

Chinese businessman Sui Liu, doing business as Xinhua Education Consulting Services, acquired the remainder of the campus and buildings for close to $12 million in mid-2018. As of early 2025, some buildings were leased by the unmanned-helicopter firm Rotor and the Northern Cyclones hockey team.

== History ==
The college was established in 1965 as the "New England Aeronautical Institute" and was associated with Boire Field, now Nashua Airport. In 1978, it merged with its Daniel Webster Junior College division to become Daniel Webster College.

By the mid-2000s, the college was having financial problems and failing to meet "financial responsibility standards" of the United States Department of Education, a measure of economic viability. In 2009, it received a score of 0.5 out of 3 on that scale, with 1.5 considered passing. Faced with the loss of educational accreditation and federal funding, which would have forced it to close, it was acquired by ITT Educational Services, Inc., the parent company of the ITT Technical Institutes, in June 2009 for US$29.3 million. The new owner converted the college to a for-profit institution.

In 2010, ITT Educational Services phased out the flight program and stopped accepting new flight students, while allowing students currently enrolled in the program to complete their education. The last of these graduated in 2013. Following the suspension of the flight program, undergraduate enrollment declined from 900 to approximately 650.

In August 2016, the U.S. Department of Education prohibited ITT Educational Services from enrolling new students who used federal financial aid, because accreditor ACICS threatened to revoke accreditation for the 130 other schools that it ran. The school suspended new enrollment, then on September 6, ceased operations. The 2016–17 academic year at Daniel Webster was not threatened because it used a different accreditor, the New England Association of Schools and Colleges (NEASC). However, the NEASC said the Department of Education's "extraordinary demands" implied that the college did not meet its standards either, and required the college to show why its NEASC accreditation should not be withdrawn as well. Daniel Webster agreed to submit such a report, but by September 9, the federal government refused to release financial aid for Daniel Webster students. Daniel Webster College, Inc. and the parent corporation filed for bankruptcy on September 16.

Southern New Hampshire University (SNHU), a non-profit college in Manchester, New Hampshire, hired 87 of DWC's faculty and staff to let the 2016–17 academic year proceed in Nashua. Seniors could graduate from Daniel Webster, while underclassmen had the option of continuing their subsequent years at SNHU.

=== Campus ===
The main campus was located on 54 acres (22 ha) next to Nashua Airport, comprising three academic buildings, a gymnasium, and an auditorium. Residences included four traditional dormitories and 15 townhouse-style residences.

=== Academics ===
The school offered 17 campus-based B.S. degree programs, and 9 online degree programs including the M.B.A. The school was accredited by the New England Association of Schools and Colleges. Daniel Webster's aeronautical engineering and mechanical engineering programs were accredited by the Accreditation Board for Engineering and Technology.

=== Athletics ===
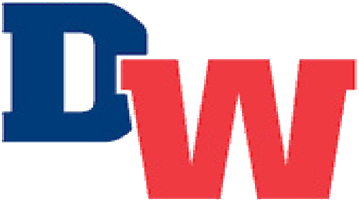
Daniel Webster athletics wordmark

Initially, a limited athletics program competed in NEIA basketball. Later, Daniel Webster enjoyed some success in baseball and men's soccer; the soccer program won the Greater Boston Small College Conference championship in 1980 and 1981.

The college joined the NCAA as an independent in 1993. It became a charter member of both the Great Northeast Athletic Conference (GNAC) in 1996 and the New England Collegiate Conference (NECC) in 2007. That year, Daniel Webster was declared the NECC's top overall athletics program, finishing first among all men's programs and second among women's programs. The program was a member of the Eastern College Athletic Conference (ECAC).

At its height in the NECC, the Daniel Webster Eagles comprised 17 NCAA Division III varsity athletic teams. Programs for men included baseball, basketball, cross country, golf, ice hockey, lacrosse, soccer, and volleyball. Women's programs included basketball, cross country, field hockey, lacrosse, soccer, softball, and volleyball. The college had sponsored men's tennis, which played on an on-campus court in the 1990s, and also briefly sponsored both wrestling and women's ice hockey.

Indoor sports were played at the Mario Vagge Gymnasium, named in honor of the former Nashua mayor who served from 1958 to 1965 and was a college benefactor. The campus had fields for baseball, softball, and soccer/lacrosse. Ice hockey, which was sponsored as a club program for over two decades before joining the NCAA in 2015, was played at Tully Forum in Billerica, Massachusetts, as well as Skate 3 in Tyngsboro, Massachusetts, then at Conway Arena in Nashua in its final years.

The athletics programs had limited success during their time in the GNAC, winning just one championship (baseball in 1996). However, in the NECC with its smaller colleges, Daniel Webster won championships in baseball, men's cross country, field hockey, women's basketball, women's volleyball, and men's soccer. It also saw a significant increase in both all-conference and major conference award winners.

SNHU did not acquire the Daniel Webster athletic programs.

== Disposition ==
SNHU tried to buy the Nashua campus, but its bids were rejected and SNHU instead opted to build a new engineering building of its own by 2019. SNHU purchased DWC's flight center, tower building, and hangar at Nashua Airport for $400,000.

After Xinhua Education Consulting Services acquired the remainder of the campus and buildings in 2018, the company petitioned the New Hampshire Higher Education Commission to continue using the Daniel Webster name, but the Commission rejected two petitions, citing dispute over the ownership of the name. In mid-2019, the mayor of Nashua said the owners thought they were buying an operating campus and not just real estate.

In 2019, Rivier University got Liu's permission to make the overgrown baseball field playable again and opened its baseball season there.

In September 2025, Nashua mayor Jim Donchess asked for state and federal support so that the city could buy the property for perhaps $20 million. In January 2026, legislators rejected the proposal.
