= Frank Snow =

American politician

Member of the New Hampshire House of Representatives from the Hillsborough 25th district
- In office 1986–1986
- Preceded by: Edward Newcombe
- Succeeded by: Linda Long

Personal details
- Born: April 18, 1941 Somerville, Massachusetts
- Died: May 2, 2015 (aged 74) The Villages, Florida
- Party: Democratic Party
- Education: Rivier College
- Occupation: Air traffic controller Real estate agent State representative Typesetter; U.S. Customs Inspector

Francis Snow (April 18, 1941 – May 2, 2015) was an American politician, businessman, and government official who served as a member of the New Hampshire House of Representatives.

== Early life ==
Snow was born on April 18, 1941, in Somerville, Massachusetts. He served in the United States Air Force for eight years and then spent seventeen years as an air traffic controller, first in Boston and then in Nashua, New Hampshire. Snow was one of the 11,345 air traffic controllers fired by President Ronald Reagan during the 1981 PATCO strike.

Snow attended Rivier College and earned a Bachelor of Arts degree in philosophy through its continuing education program.

== Political career ==
Snow's firing during the air traffic controllers strike contributed to him becoming a supporter of the Democratic Party. In 1983 he was an alternate delegate to the New Hampshire State Democratic Party Convention. In 1985, he ran in the special election for the seat in the New Hampshire House of Representatives that was vacated by Edward Newcombe, who resigned after he moved out of state. Snow ran a low-key campaign. He promised to work to bring more state money to help improve Nashua's roads, took a stance against the proposed construction of tollbooths on the Everett Turnpike in Nashua, and opposed the creation of a state sales or income tax. Snow defeated Alan Thomaier, a member of the Nashua Board of Education and the John Birch Society, for the Democratic nomination, and Republican Diane Dyer 165 votes to 115 in the special election. During his tenure in the House, Snow received a 100% rating from the liberal New Hampshire People's Alliance. In 1986, Snow ran for a full term as one of Ward 5's three state representatives. In the Democratic primary, he finished third, behind incumbent David E. Cote and newcomer Linda Long, but ahead of his former opponent, Thomaier. In the general election, Snow, Cote, and Long faced Republicans Donnalee Lozeau and Joseph W. DuBois, Jr. Snow finished fourth, behind Cote, Lozeau, and Long.

== Real estate ==
In 1983, Snow received his New Hampshire real estate broker's license. In 1985 he went to work for Valicenti Realty. He later owned and operated his own real estate company, La Neige Real Estate, in Nashua. Snow's experience in real estate included custom home design and building, land development, and property management.

== Later life and death ==
Snow later worked for a friend as a typesetter and returned to government service as a United States Customs inspector. After he retired, Snow moved to The Villages, Florida. He died of on May 2, 2015, after suffering from lung cancer.
