= Notre Dame College (New Hampshire) =

Former Catholic college in the United States

Coordinates: 43°00′50″N 71°27′55″W

- Type: Private
- Active: 1950–2002
- Affiliations: Roman Catholic (Sisters of Holy Cross)
- Location: Manchester, New Hampshire, United States
- Campus: 8 acres (0.032 km^{2}); Suburban

Notre Dame College was a Catholic college in Manchester, New Hampshire, United States, and affiliated with the Sisters of Holy Cross of Montreal, Quebec, Canada. After more than 50 years of operation, it closed in May 2002, due to "difficult enrollment and financial issues."

== History ==
Notre Dame was founded as a college exclusively for the education of women in 1950 arising from the "Teacher Training Institute" which the Sisters of the Holy Cross had established five years prior. It originally occupied two buildings in the well-to-do section of North Manchester. The main building had once been a private mansion designed in the Norman style of architecture, while the adjoining building had actually served as the carriage house. Though a few of the earlier students resided in the upper rooms of the main building, most of the enrolled women commuted to classes from Manchester and its immediate environs. In fact, never in its entire history would the school draw less than half of its students from within commuting distance, and the solid majority of those who attended Notre Dame were the first in their families to attend college, and were from modest to average income households.

Originally intended as a school to train future teachers, Notre Dame remained firm to this commitment while simultaneously branching out into the liberal arts and sciences, business and fine arts, and later on into such fields as communications and the health sciences. Most of the additional buildings to the campus were private homes of various sizes purchased in succeeding years to serve as residence halls for the growing number of students from further distances as well as for administrative offices. However, in the late 1960s, Holy Cross Hall was constructed to function as the epicenter of college activity. The three-level building contained nearly all academic facilities along with an auditorium-gymnasium, chapel and dining hall. The original Norman-style mansion became known as Vezeau House (named in honor of long-serving college president Jeannette Vezeau), and served as the main administration building. The carriage house was renovated and expanded to become the Paul Harvey Library, named in honor of a local businessman and benefactor, and at its height contained 60,000 volumes and 700 periodical subscriptions, as well as faculty offices and seminar rooms. The only building aside from Holy Cross Hall constructed from scratch was the Nicholas Isaak Student Center which housed a large recreation room as well as student activities and government offices. In later years, the college would purchase a former motel situated about a mile and a half away to serve as additional dormitory space. At the time of its closing, Notre Dame had 22 buildings located throughout North Manchester with a residence hall capacity for approximately 250 students.

Beginning in the 1970s, Notre Dame adopted a policy of partial coeducation by admitting men into its master's degree programs, its evening and weekend undergraduate programs, and as non-resident undergraduate day students. In 1985, the decision was made to become fully coeducational, and men were also admitted as full-time undergraduate resident students. In contrast to many other all-female colleges that had either gone coeducational or were considering the policy, Notre Dame did not experience any notable negative reaction from either students or alumnae, and men in fact were for the most part warmly welcomed as full-time resident students.

The school focused consistently on expanding its undergraduate and graduate programs, and at the time of its closing, offered the Master of Arts degree in counseling and theology (two separate majors), the Master of Education degree in a variety of teacher education subfields, and the Master of Science degree in two health science disciplines, physician assistant studies and in physical therapy. These two latter programs were highly selective, and were based in a former insurance office building in downtown Manchester about a mile away from the main campus.

== Closing of the college ==
In November 2001, the school announced it would close at the end of the school year. The total enrollment of degree candidates at Notre Dame at the time of its closing in 2002 was around 1,100 students, clearly not a figure that would suggest an institution struggling to survive. This would lead to speculation by some that the college made a rash decision to cease operations, and led others to charge that administrative and financial mismanagement was the cause for closure as opposed to problems relating to student matriculation. However, it should also be noted that full-time undergraduate enrollment at the school, its primary source of revenue, was barely over 400. In addition, tuition at Notre Dame was markedly lower than at most non-public colleges in the region, while many continuing education and graduate students would simply take a few classes without actually receiving degrees, thereby contributing to even more unstable matriculation numbers. The location of the school would also prove to be a liability in that the eight acres of land it occupied were scattered throughout a two-mile residential area with no room to consolidate or expand among all the privately owned homes. At one point in the 1990s, college officials contemplated a two campus scenario, with the second campus to occupy either a parcel of land across the Merrimack River in West Manchester or on the same land in South Manchester where the Sisters of Holy Cross maintained their mother house. Brief consideration was also given toward relocating all facilities to the 550-acre (220 ha) campus of the defunct Mount Saint Mary College in the neighboring town of Hooksett, but in the end, none of these plans ever came to fruition. To some extent, Notre Dame was also compromised when the University of New Hampshire established a thriving branch campus in Manchester. The latter was strictly a commuter school which offered many of the same degree programs as Notre Dame at less expensive costs, and thus siphoned away a significant portion of local area students who otherwise would have considered attending Notre Dame. Finally, with an increasing dependence on local residents to avail themselves of its academic offerings, coupled with either an inability or unwillingness to attract students from beyond the immediate area, the college had placed itself in a grave demographic situation.

In effect, the creation of the highly selective graduate programs in physician assistant studies and physical therapy marked the last-ditch effort by Notre Dame to both carve out an academic niche for itself, as well as to simply survive. However, the announcement in the late summer of 2001 that the school would graduate its last class after 52 years of existence in May 2002 would come as a shock to many. Those students with one year or less remaining in their academic programs would be permitted to study at other institutions within the New Hampshire College & University Council for the purpose of obtaining Notre Dame degrees, while others were to be worked with individually in terms of securing proper transfer arrangements to other schools. The outlook for faculty and staff members, in stark contrast, would be much more bleak, as little could be done with regard to helping them secure employment elsewhere.

== After closure ==
Most of the residence halls, the President's House, and even the former library and student center, are now privately owned homes. The former graduate health sciences building is once again an office facility, as is the former motel that served as a residence hall. The two primary buildings on the Notre Dame campus, Holy Cross Hall and Vezeau House, continue to function in an academic and cultural capacity. Holy Cross Hall is now the home of Mount Saint Mary Academy, a Catholic preparatory school for grades K to 8, while Vezeau House is now the headquarters of the Manchester Community Music School, a non-profit music school. Several of the liberal arts, education and fine arts programs were transferred from Notre Dame to nearby Southern New Hampshire University in Manchester, as the latter has sought to transform itself from a primarily business and technology-oriented institution. The Notre Dame College Association of Alumni and Friends serves as a resource for former students, faculty and staff of the college. It holds an annual reunion each summer, and helps to provide information on school transcripts.
