= Tate Westbrook =

American naval officer

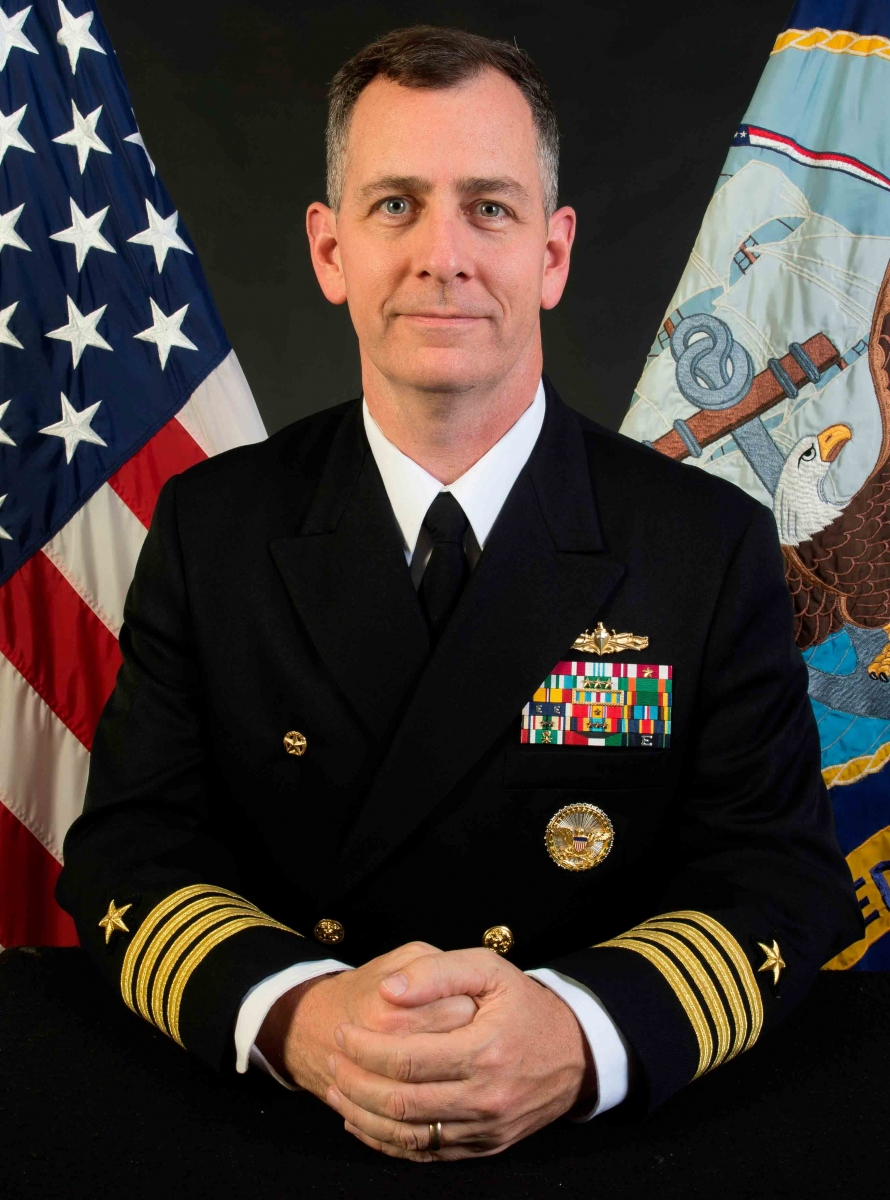
- Captain Tate Westbrook
- Born: Michael Tate Westbrook
- Military career
- Allegiance: United States of America
- Branch: United States Navy
- Rank: Captain
- Commands: USS Spruance (DDG-111) Command Task Force Six Five Destroyer Squadron Six Zero
- Awards: Defense Meritorious Service Medal; Navy Commendation Medal; Navy Achievement Medal

Michael Tate Westbrook is an officer in the United States Navy who served as commanding officer of the USS Spruance (DDG-111) from May 2010 to May 2012. Prior to this, he served in the Pentagon on the Naval Operations Staff's Programming Division from fall 2007 through June 2009.

== Career ==
Westbrook's initial sea tours were in USS Hawes (FFG-53) as Communications Officer, Ordnance Officer and Weapons Control Officer, and included combat action in Operation Desert Shield and Operation Desert Storm. In 1993, he resigned from active duty to pursue a career as a small business entrepreneur in Charleston, South Carolina, during which time he also achieved a U.S. Coast Guard Merchant Master's license. He returned to active duty in 1997 and eventually served as Combat Systems Officer in USS O'Brien (DD-975), then later served as the commissioning Combat Systems Officer in USS McCampbell (DDG-85).

He then served at the Missile Defense Agency as the Aegis Ballistic Missile Defense Program Support Officer in 2003, and as the Missile Defense Agency's liaison to the United States House Appropriations Subcommittee on Defense from 2004 through 2005. He then served as Executive Officer in USS Laboon (DDG-58), one of the three ships of the first Atlantic Fleet Destroyer Sea Swap experiment.

In 2007, he was one of the 30 selected as National Finalists in the White House Fellows program. He represented the Navy as a 2008-2009 Fellow in the Massachusetts Institute of Technology Seminar XXI program.

Westbrook was the first "plankowner" Commanding Officer in USS SPRUANCE (DDG 111) built at General Dynamics Bath Iron Works, in Bath, Maine. Following the ship's commissioning in Key West, Florida, Westbrook brought the ship to its first home port, Naval Station San Diego, where SPRUANCE joined the Little Beavers of Destroyer Squadron 23.

As Commodore of permanent Task Force 65, Westbrook commanded the Navy task force that launched the 2017 Shayrat missile strike in response to the Khan Shaykhun chemical attack in Syria.

Westbrook, a certified defense financial manager completed a 28-year Navy career as Director of the office of Budget Programming Integration (OPNAV N801), known in Pentagon parlance as "The Bullpen." Westbrook retired from active duty in June 2021.

== Military awards ==
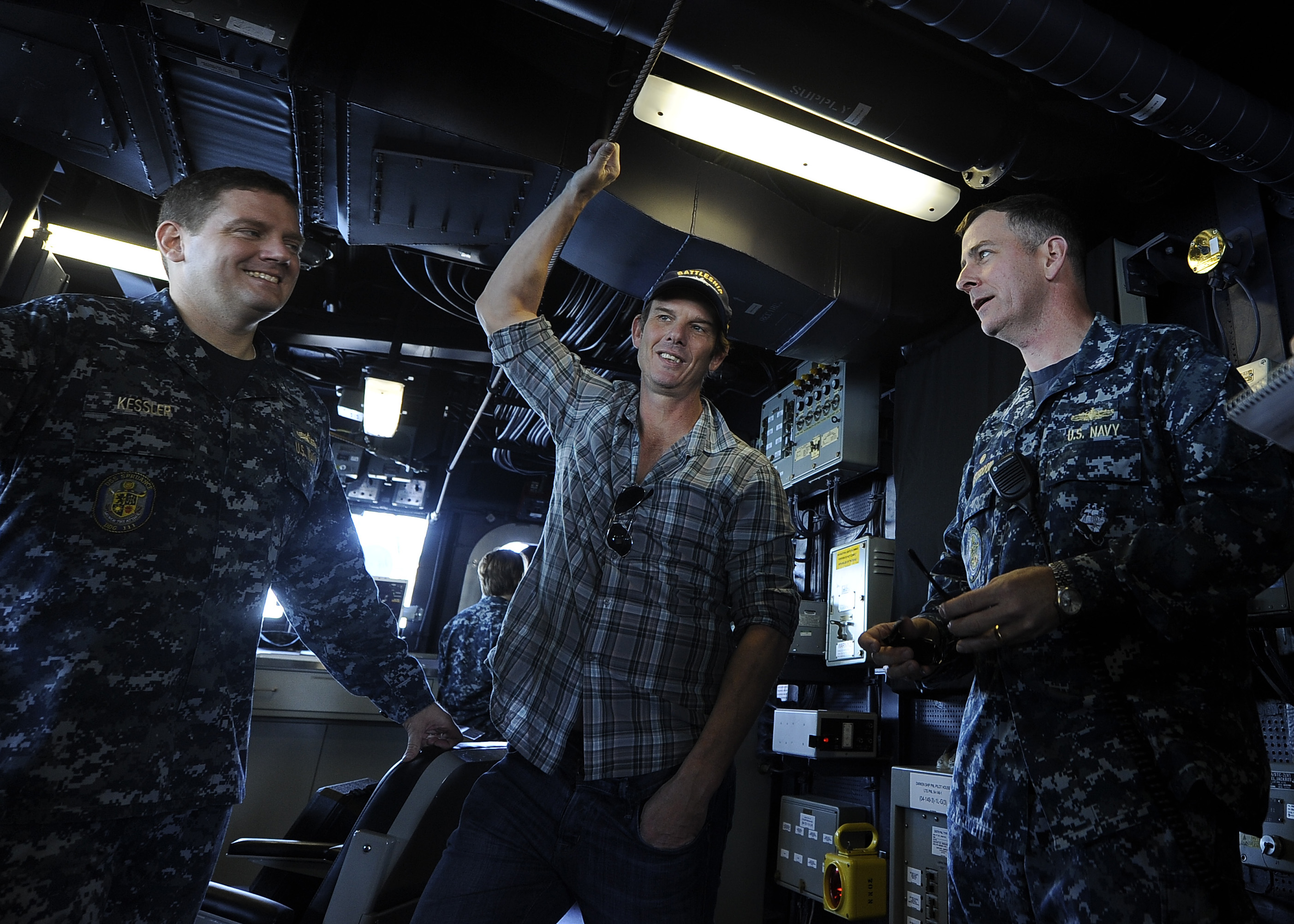
Cmdr. George Kessler (left) and Westbrook (right) provide a tour of the USS Spruance to film director Peter Berg.

Ribbon	Description	Notes
Ribbon of the DMSM	Defense Meritorious Service Medal	
Ribbon of the NMCCM	Navy and Marine Corps Commendation Medal	
Ribbon of the NMCAM	Navy and Marine Corps Achievement Medal	

== Personal life ==
Westbrook is a native of Murfreesboro, Tennessee. He holds a bachelor's degree in rhetoric from Tulane University and a Master of Business Administration from Southern New Hampshire University.
