= Hellenic American University =

University in New Hampshire, United States

Coordinates: 37°58′54.4″N 23°44′14.7″E

- Established: 2004
- Founders: Chris Spirou
- Academic affiliations: New Hampshire College & University Council
- President: Leonidas Phoibos Koskos
- Students: 432 (2018)
- Undergraduates: 185
- Postgraduates: 247
- Location: Nashua, New Hampshire, United States, and Athens, Greece
- Website: hauniv.edu

The Hellenic American University a private degree-granting institution of higher education founded in 2004 in Manchester, New Hampshire, United States, with instructional locations in Nashua, New Hampshire and Athens, Greece. The Athens campus shares buildings with the Hellenic American Union (HAU) and the Hellenic American College (HAEC), a Greek affiliate.

Hellenic American University is a member of the New Hampshire College & University Council (NHCUC), a non-profit consortium of 17 public and private institutions of higher education in the state of New Hampshire.

== Description ==
Hellenic American University began with a small and focused program, a Master's in Business Administration, launched in November 2004, following approval by the New Hampshire Postsecondary Education Commission (NH-PEC), now the New Hampshire Department of Education Division of Higher Education—Higher Education Commission. The university's leadership, including its first president, Chris Spirou, and most faculty members, reside in Greece. Initial funding for the university came from the Hellenic American Union (HAU), a non-profit Greek association established in 1957 with U.S. government encouragement to promote U.S.-Greek educational and cultural relations, including through English-language teaching and testing. Spirou served as president of the HAU board from 1994 until 2020, and as president of the university until 2012, when he was replaced as university president by Leonidas-Phoibos Koskos, who served concurrently as managing director of the HAU. The university shares use of the classrooms, library, cafe, and other facilities of the Union in central Athens.

Article 16 of the Greek Constitution prohibits the establishment of university-level institutions by private persons. However, foreign universities can operate Greek affiliates, provided they do not use the word "university" in their name. Therefore, the Hellenic American University conducts most of its academic programs in Greece through an entity called the Hellenic American College, while degrees are awarded by the university through its Nashua offices.

== Degrees ==
The State of New Hampshire Post-Secondary Education Commission has granted the Hellenic American University the authority to grant the following degrees:

- Bachelor of Arts in English Language and Literature
- Bachelor of Science in Business Administration
- Bachelor of Science in Information Technology
- Bachelor of Music
- Bachelor of Science in Psychology
- Associate of Science in General Engineering
- Associate of Science in Hospitality Management
- Master of Business Administration (MBA)
- Professional Master of Business Administration (PMBA)
- Master of Science in Information Technology (MSIT)
- Master of Arts in Applied Linguistics (MAAL)
- Master of Arts in Translation (MAT)
- Master of Arts in Conference Interpretation (MACI).
- Master of Science in Psychology (MSPsy)

Hellenic American University is accredited by the New England Commission of Higher Education (NECHE).
