= Signum University =

Online university focusing on the humanities

- Type: Private graduate school
- Established: 2012; 14 years ago
- President: Corey Olsen
- Academic staff: 22
- Administrative staff: 10
- Location: Bedford, New Hampshire, United States
- Website: signumuniversity.org

Signum University is a non-profit, online graduate school based in New Hampshire, granting the degree of Master of Arts in Language and Literature. Its founder and president is Corey Olsen.

Signum's master's degree program has four areas of concentration: Classic Literature, Tolkien Studies, Germanic Philology, and Imaginative Literature. Instruction is done entirely via the Internet, with a combination of the use of webinars, live and pre-recorded lectures, Google Classroom, and Google Groups.

Signum is one of the few universities to offer multiple courses in Tolkien Studies. In addition to founder Corey Olsen, the university also draws from other notable Tolkien scholars such as Tom Shippey, Verlyn Flieger, Douglas A. Anderson, John Garth, Michael D. C. Drout, and Dimitra Fimi. The Germanic philology program is also robust and growing.

== History ==
Signum's beginning was with the launch of the "Tolkien Professor" podcast in 2009 by Corey Olsen, who was teaching at Washington College at the time. In 2011 its first credit classes were offered, and in 2012 the university was founded.

In 2018, Olsen announced that Signum University was to be formally entered for state certification via the New Hampshire Department of Education. Following some days of crowdfunding, they raised the $23,720 required, and later in 2018, it began the ascension process, announcing that the New Hampshire Department of Education had accepted the request for Signum University to do business in the state after facing a difficult vote in the New Hampshire legislature.

In 2021, Signum received authorization from the State of New Hampshire to grant the Master of Arts degree.
