= Upper Valley Educators Institute =

Graduate teachers college in New Hampshire

Coordinates: 43.6375°N 72.2308°W

- Type: Private graduate school
- Established: 1969; 57 years ago
- Location: Lebanon, New Hampshire, United States
- Website: uvei.edu

Upper Valley Educators Institute is a non-profit graduate teachers college based in New Hampshire.

UVEI was founded in 1969. Initially, the program focused on teacher preparation, and later expanded to include school administration. The Graduate School of Education was established in 2010 to offer master's degrees and merged into UVEI in 2021. The institute also provides continuing education and community outreach and participates in education research.

Elijah Hawkes, author of School for the Age of Upheaval: Classrooms that Get Personal, Get Political and Get to Work, is the institute's Director of School Leadership Programs. The institute's first director, Barbara Ragle Barnes, was the first person to receive the Master of Arts in Liberal Studies from Dartmouth College.

The institute is accredited by the New England Commission of Higher Education. It is part of a wave of "new graduate schools of education," or nGSEs, established since 2000.

== Academics ==
UVEI's primary offerings are teacher and principal certification programs. Additionally, the institute offers several Masters of Education degrees in areas like teaching, literacy, and school leadership.

Colby–Sawyer College in nearby New London has a partnership with UVEI that provides a pathway for undergraduates to obtain teacher certification.
