= Southern New Hampshire University =

Private university near Manchester, New Hampshire, US

- Former names: New Hampshire School of Accounting and Secretarial Science (1932–1961); New Hampshire College of Accounting and Commerce (1961–1969); New Hampshire College (1969–2001)
- Motto: Summa optimaque (Latin)
- Motto in English: "The greatest and the best"
- Type: Private university
- Established: September 12, 1932; 94 years ago
- Accreditation: NECHE
- Academic affiliations: NAICU; NHCUC
- Endowment: $58.6 million (2023)
- President: Lisa Marsh Ryerson
- Faculty: 161 full-time 5,798 part-time
- Students: 3,913 (on-campus); 135,000 (online); 138,913 (total)
- Undergraduates: 70,661
- Postgraduates: 20,294
- Location: Manchester/Hooksett, New Hampshire, United States; 43°2′23″N 71°27′14″W
- Campus: 300 acres (120 ha); Midsize suburb
- Other campuses: Online
- Newspaper: Penman Press
- Colors: Blue and gold
- Nickname: Penmen
- Sporting affiliations: NCAA Division II – NE-10
- Mascot: Petey Penmen
- Website: snhu.edu

Southern New Hampshire University (SNHU) is a private university in Manchester and Hooksett, New Hampshire, United States. The university is accredited by the New England Commission of Higher Education, along with national accreditation for some hospitality, health, education and business degrees. As of 2021 it has 170,000 online students and 3,000 on campus.

== History ==
=== 20th century ===
The university was founded in 1932 by Harry A. B. Shapiro, an accountant, and his wife, Gertrude Gittle Crockett Shapiro, under the name New Hampshire School of Accounting and Secretarial Science. H.A.B. Shapiro died in 1952; 25 students were enrolled at that time, and his widow ran the school until 1971, continuing as president emerita until 1986.

In 1961, the school was incorporated and renamed the New Hampshire College of Accounting and Commerce. The state of New Hampshire granted the college its charter in 1963, which gave it degree-granting authority. The first associate degrees were awarded that year, and the first bachelor's degrees were conferred in 1966. The college became a nonprofit institution under a board of trustees in 1968, and its name was shortened to New Hampshire College in 1969.

The 1970s were a time of growth and change. The college moved from its downtown Manchester site to the now 300-acre (120 ha) campus along the Merrimack River, at the northern border of Manchester with the town of Hooksett, in 1971. Academic offerings expanded with the Master of Business Administration program in 1974, as well as the human services programs adopted from Franconia College, which closed in 1978.

In 1981, New Hampshire College received authorization from the New Hampshire legislature to offer Master of Science degrees in business-related subjects, as well as Master of Human Services degrees. (All human services programs were transferred to Springfield College in Massachusetts by the end of the decade.) That same year, the college opened its North Campus on the site of the former Mount Saint Mary College, which had closed three years earlier. The North Campus became the home of the culinary arts program, which was established in 1983.

Ultimately, the North Campus was sold, and its academic programs were consolidated on the main campus. This spurred several major construction projects on the main campus in the mid-1990s: Washington Hall, a residence hall; Webster Hall, home to the School of Business; the Hospitality Center; and Belknap Hall. In 1995, New Hampshire College began offering distance learning programs through the Internet. In 1998, the school expanded academic degrees to include a Ph.D. in community economic development and the Doctor of Business Administration.

=== 21st century ===
New Hampshire College became Southern New Hampshire University on July 1, 2001. The same year, the university completed a new residence hall, New Castle Hall, followed by a new academic facility, Robert Frost Hall, containing the McIninch Art Gallery, in 2002. When nearby Notre Dame College closed, three of Notre Dame's graduate education programs and two undergraduate education programs transferred to SNHU.

When President Paul LeBlanc took over in 2003, the early 2000s recession had affected SNHU with rising tuition and shrinking enrollment. LeBlanc addressed this in 2009 with an increased focus on the College of Online and Continuing Education. Rapid revenue growth from the division helped save the struggling main campus, where enrollment had slumped. SNHU focused on increasing graduation rates and adjusting the online college to meet the needs of working adults who comprise most of its student body.

Student housing continued to grow with Conway and Lincoln Halls opening in 2004, and Hampton and Windsor Halls in 2006. The Academic Center and the Dining Center were completed by 2009.

List of presidents
Name	Tenure
Harry A. B. Shapiro	1932–1952
Gertrude C. Shapiro	1952–1972
Edward Shapiro	1972–1987
Richard A. Gustafson	1987–2003
Paul J. LeBlanc	2003–2024
Lisa Marsh Ryerson	2024–present

A new 152-room residence hall, Tuckerman Hall, opened in 2013. A 50,000-square-foot (4,600 m^{2}) Learning Commons opened in 2014, housing the library, the information technology help desk, a café, and media production services. The former Shapiro Library reopened as the William S. and Joan Green Center for Student Success, a student center.

The university purchased naming rights to the downtown Manchester Civic Arena in 2016, naming it SNHU Arena for at least 10 years in a deal that included internships for students and use of the facility for graduation and athletic events.

SNHU absorbed the faculty and staff at Daniel Webster College along with the engineering and aviation programs, operating the college's campus in Nashua for the rest of the 2016–17 academic year after its parent company, ITT Technical Institute, filed for bankruptcy. SNHU purchased the college's aviation facilities (including a flight center, tower building, and hangar) at Nashua Airport for $410,000 and enrolled up to 30 students in its Aviation Operations and Management bachelor's degree program. An undisclosed Chinese university, which plans to open a satellite campus, outbid SNHU for the former campus. To accommodate the new students, SNHU converted an unused warehouse on campus into space for classrooms, laboratories, and a machine shop. A dedicated engineering and technology building was completed in 2020.

Three major construction projects were completed in 2017: the Gustafson Center, a new welcome center named for the former university president Richard A. Gustafson; Penmen Stadium, a 1,500-seat outdoor stadium; and Monadnock Hall, an apartment-style residence hall. In November 2017, the university announced a $100 million project including a 1,700 space parking garage and an additional 500 jobs at its downtown Manchester offices supporting the online college.

In 2017, a fire burned down Greely Hall, one of the original residence halls on campus. The fire forced 50 students to evacuate to a nearby hotel (provided by the university) until new accommodations could be made. Nobody was injured, and the students returned to on-campus housing within two days of the fire to select dormitories with extra space. No longer salvageable, the building was demolished to make additional space for a new dormitory, Kingston Hall, which opened in August 2018. In addition to Greely Hall, Kingston Hall replaced three other original dormitories on campus (Chocorua, Kearsarge, and Winnisquam halls).

In 2020, President LeBlanc reported that the school was on its way to reduce student tuition to $10,000 a year, which required a close look at inefficiencies in labor and programming.

In 2023, SNHU cut its staff by 180 workers. An additional 52 positions were eliminated in 2024.

== Campus ==
The campus is partly in the South Hooksett census-designated place, within the town of Hooksett, and partly in the city of Manchester. The campus spans more than 300 acres along the Merrimack River and includes academic buildings, residence halls, athletic facilities, and administrative offices. Because the majority of SNHU students are enrolled in online programs, the physical campus supports primarily undergraduate residential programs.

== Academics ==
Academic rankings

Regional
- U.S. News & World Report: 151-167

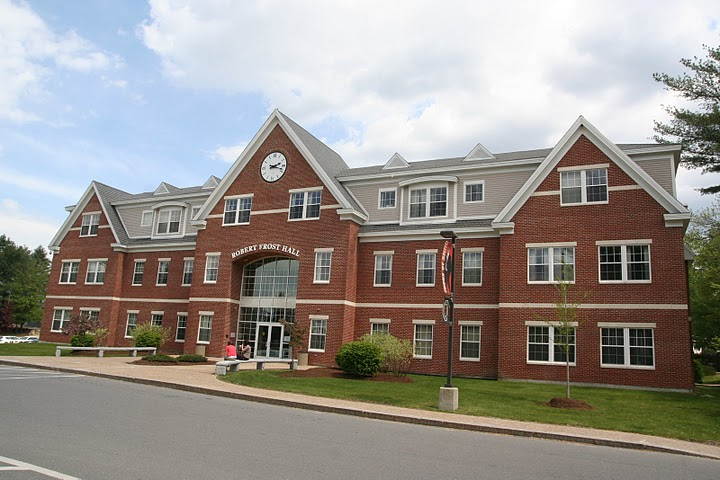
Robert Frost Hall, named for American poet Robert Frost, is located on the university's main campus in Manchester, New Hampshire.

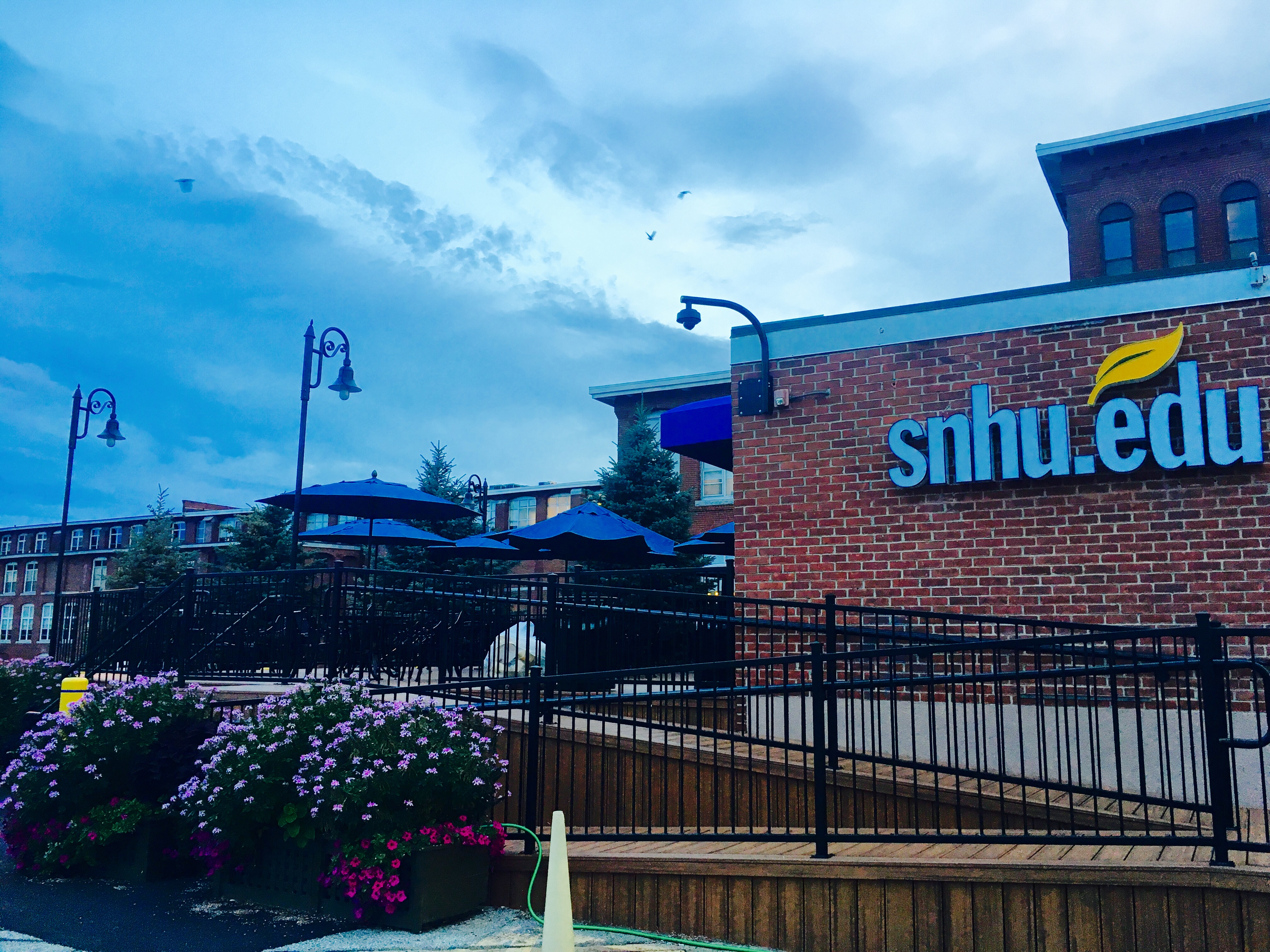
SNHU's College of Online & Continuing Education offices, located in the Manchester Millyards near SNHU Arena.

SNHU has an admissions rate of 88%. In 2021, U.S. News & World Report ranked the university #131-171 in Regional Universities North.

=== Colleges and schools ===
Southern New Hampshire University offers undergraduate, graduate, doctoral, and certificate programs through its multiple colleges and schools. The colleges and schools that compose SNHU are:

- School of Engineering, Technology & Aeronautics (SETA)
- College of Online & Continuing Education (COCE)
- School of Arts & Sciences
- School of Business
- School of Education
- School of International Engagement

=== Faculty ===
SNHU's faculty consists of 130 full-time instructors and 8,042 part-time instructors. According to The Century Foundation, SNHU spent more than $11 million on advertising from August 2016 to January 2017, and only 18 cents of every dollar was spent on instruction.

=== Regional centers ===
Southern New Hampshire University's COCE offers programs both online and at its three regional centers. The university's main campus serves as a regional center, in addition to satellite campuses in Salem, New Hampshire and Brunswick, Maine.

After Trinity College in Vermont closed in 2001, SNHU established the Vermont Center in Colchester, which houses the field-based graduate program in education.

=== Online programs ===
Enrollment in the College of Online & Continuing Education (COCE), based in downtown Manchester, has increased rapidly: from 8,000 students in 2001 to 34,000 in 2014, to over 135,000 according to SNHU. Alumni and educators outside SNHU have criticized the university's aggressive recruiting techniques and nationwide advertising campaigns, comparing them to those used by for-profit institutions such as the University of Phoenix and the now-defunct ITT Technical Institute. In response, LeBlanc said that SNHU has "borrowed the best of operational practices from the for-profits (customer service, data analytics, a sense of urgency and accountability) while eschewing the practices that cast them in such a poor light."

SNHU's College for America (CfA) operated from 2013 until it was retired. CfA offered degrees that relied on competency-based learning rather than traditional credit hours, based in part on programs at Western Governors University. In 2013, CfA became the first of its kind to gain federal approval from the U.S. Department of Education. In 2017, it formed a partnership with the U.S. Office of Personnel Management, making all federal employees eligible for CfA courses.

=== Costs and student outcomes ===
Beginning in the fall of 2021, campus tuition was reduced to $15,000 per year (and $10,000 per year for select programs). The graduation rate for campus students is 68%, and the median salary after attending is $45,800. In the 2017–18 award year, 43,067 students received the federal Pell Grant.

== Accreditation and memberships ==
Since 1973, Southern New Hampshire University has been accredited by the New England Commission of Higher Education and is approved by the New Hampshire Department of Education Division of Higher Education—Higher Education Commission. The School of Business is accredited by the Accreditation Council for Business Schools and Programs. Some programs have specialized accreditation, such as the sport management programs, which are recognized by the North American Society for Sport Management, and the hospitality administration program, which is recognized by the Accreditation Commission for Programs in Hospitality Administration.

Nationally, it is a member of the Association of American Colleges and Universities, the American Council on Education, and the National Association of Independent Colleges and Universities. At the state level, it is a member of the New Hampshire College & University Council (NHCUC), a consortium of higher learning institutions in New Hampshire.

== Student activities ==
Southern New Hampshire University has many student organizations on campus, including Radio SNHU (the campus radio station) and The Penmen Press (the student newspaper). SNHU also publishes The Penmen Review, an online creative writing journal for students and alumni.

== Athletics ==
Southern New Hampshire University participates in NCAA Division II athletics. It is a member of the Eastern College Athletic Conference and the Northeast-10 Conference. The teams' nickname, the Penmen, is an homage to the university's history in accounting. The university's mascot is named "Petey Penmen".

SNHU is a recipient of the NCAA Foundation Academic Achievement Award, which recognizes high graduation rates among student athletes. SNHU took home the award for the highest graduation rate among all Division II institutions. SNHU also earned the Northeast 10 Conference Academic Achievement Award after the 2001–02 school year.

== Notable alumni ==
- Rebecca Adamson (born 1950), Cherokee businessperson and advocate
- Felix G. Arroyo (born 1979), former Boston city councilor
- Jeremy Bonomo (born 1980), soccer head coach
- Preston Burpo (born 1972), former MLS player and goalkeeping coach for the New York Red Bulls
- Aaron Bushnell, U.S. Air Force serviceman known for self-immolating outside the Embassy of Israel in Washington, D.C. in protest against the United States support for Israel in the Gaza war.
- Chuck Collins (born 1959), author, co-founder of United for a Fair Economy, and senior scholar at the Institute for Policy Studies
- Ed Davis (born 1956), former commissioner of the Boston Police Department
- Elaine Duke (born 1958), former U.S. deputy secretary of homeland security
- Jack Flanagan (born 1957), former New Hampshire state representative
- Ron Fortier (born 1946), comic book writer
- Peter Holland (born 1991), professional hockey player
- Marjoie Kilkelly, former Maine state senator and state representative
- Marjorie Herrera Lewis (born 1957), author
- Stephen D. Lovejoy, former Maine state representative
- Paul Mark, current Massachusetts state senator and former state representative
- Garrett Mason (born 1985), former Maine state senator
- Peggy Morgan (born 1979), professional mixed martial artist
- Marc R. Pacheco (born 1952), current Massachusetts state senator and former state representative
- Pam Patenaude (born 1961), former U.S. deputy secretary of housing and urban development
- Rob Paternostro (born 1973), former professional basketball player and head coach of the Leicester Riders
- Deonna Purrazzo (born 1994), professional wrestler
- Benjamin Ramos (born 1956), former Pennsylvania state representative
- Annette Robinson (born 1940), former New York state assemblywoman
- Abuhena Saifulislam (born 1963), U.S. Navy chaplain serving with troops in the Marine Corps
- Mohd Sidek Hassan (born 1951), chairman of Petronas, former president of the International Islamic University Malaysia, and 12th chief secretary to the government of Malaysia
- Samia Suluhu (born 1960), current president and former vice president of Tanzania, the first woman to hold either of these positions
- Chris Tsonis (born 1991), professional soccer player
- Tate Westbrook, U.S. Navy officer who commanded the USS Spruance (DDG-111) from 2010 to 2012
- Corey Wilson (born 1985), U.S. Marine Corps veteran and former Maine state representative
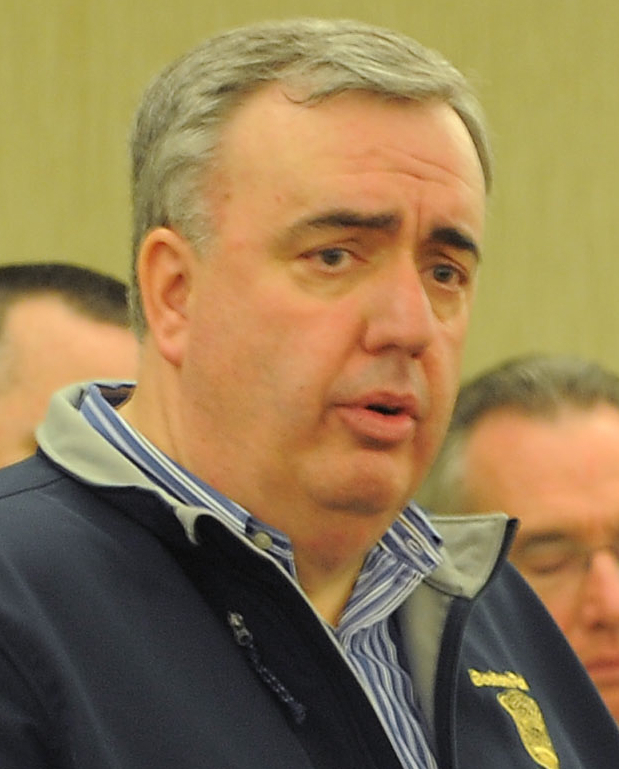
Edward F. Davis

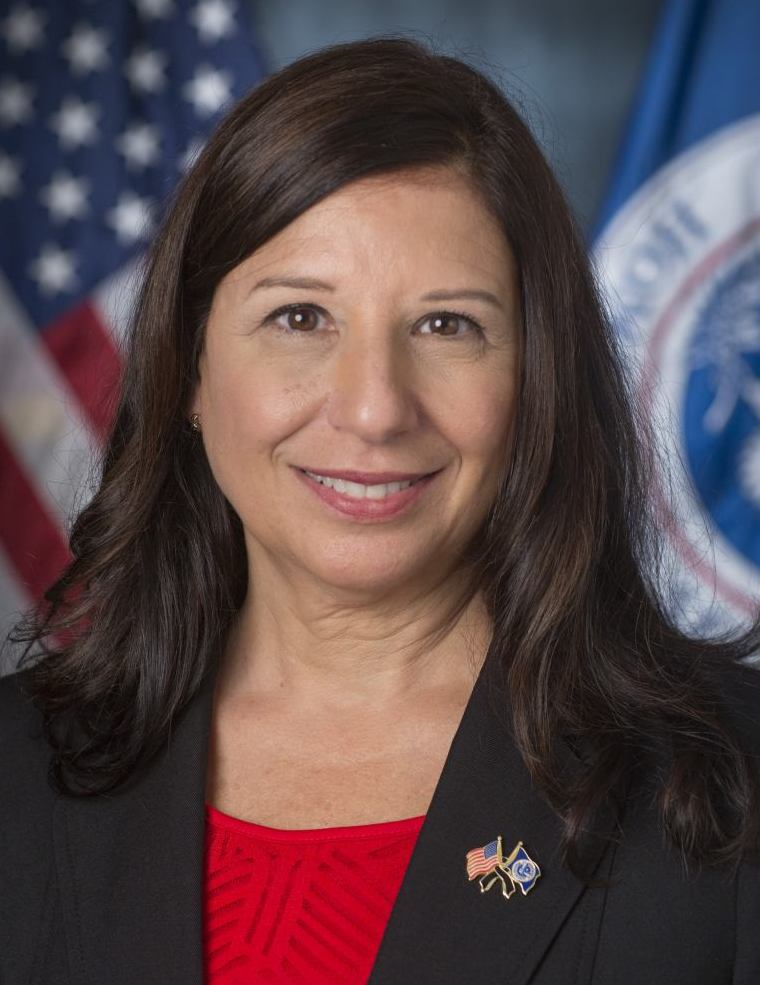
Elaine Duke

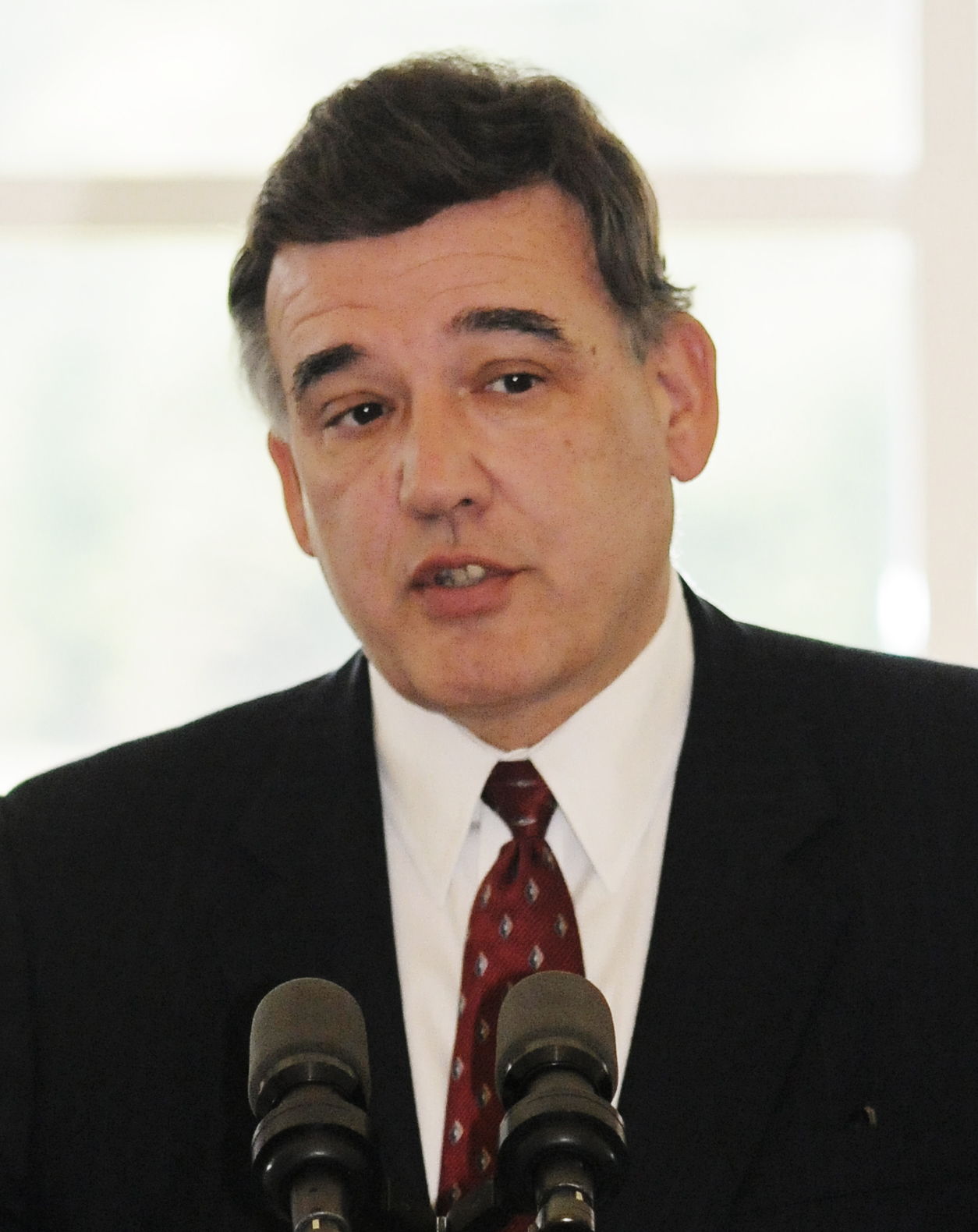
Marc R. Pacheco

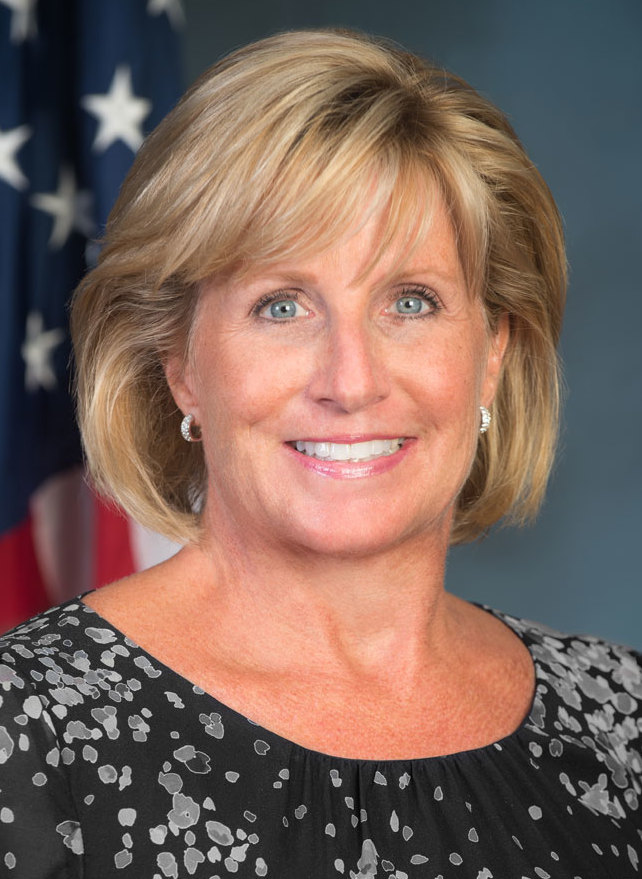
Pam Patenaude

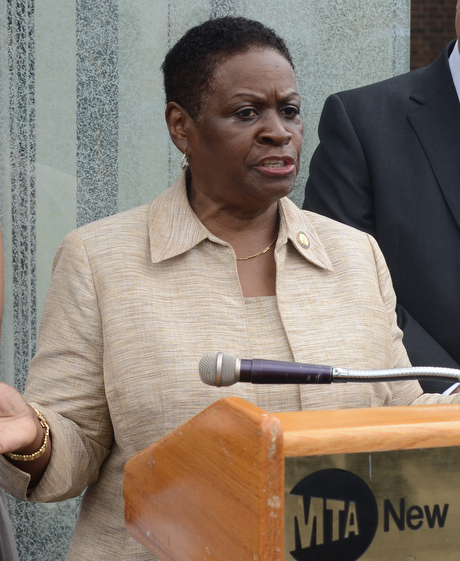
Annette Robinson

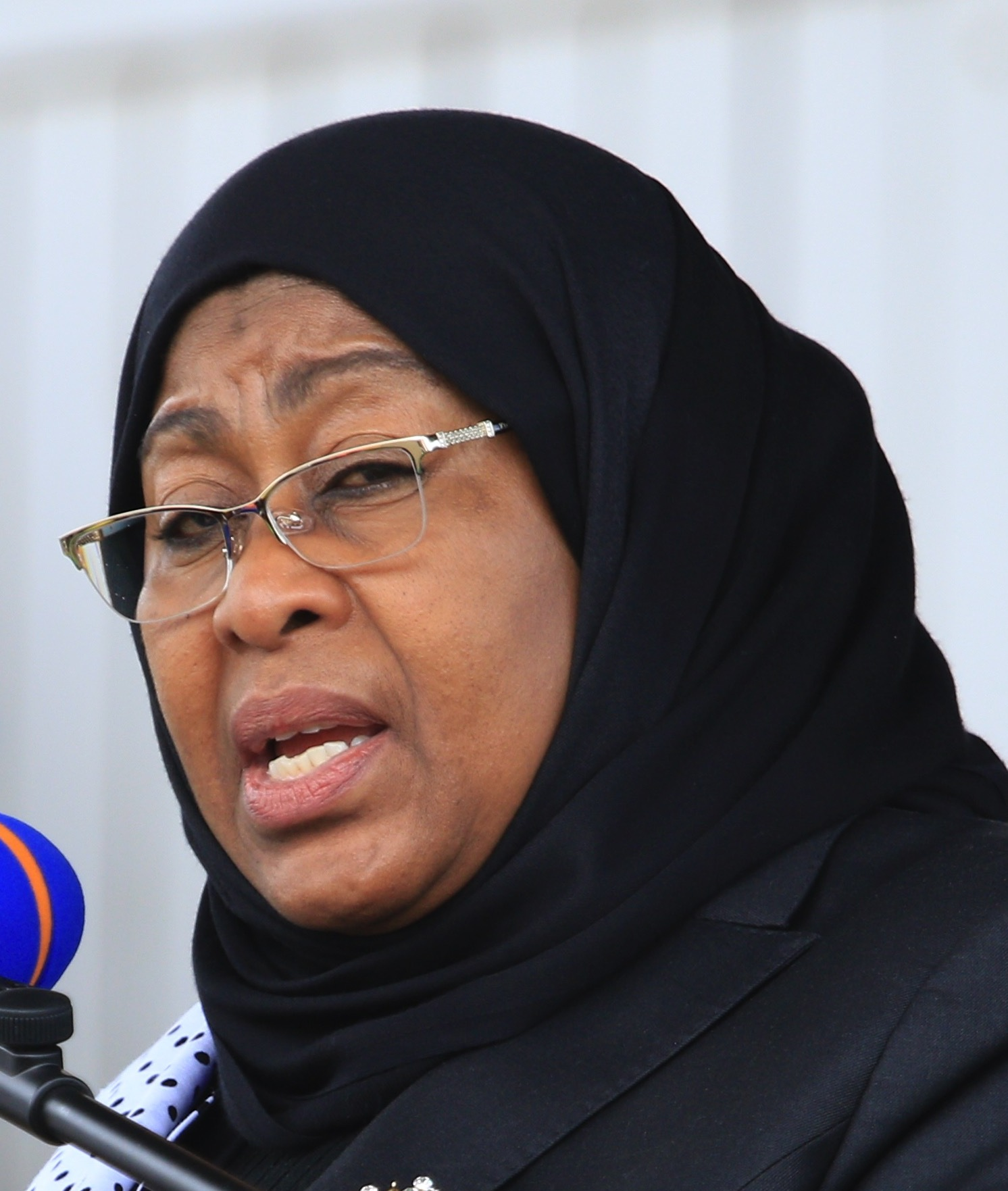
Samia Suluhu

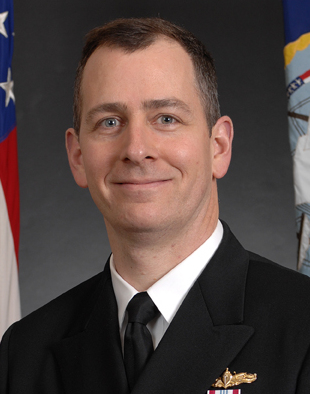
Tate Westbrook
