= Rivier University =

Private university in Nashua, New Hampshire, US

- Former name: Rivier College (1933–2012)
- Motto: Altiora et Meliora
- Motto in English: Higher and Better
- Type: Private university
- Established: 1933; 93 years ago
- Affiliations: NHCUC
- Religious affiliation: Catholic Church
- Endowment: $41 million (2020)
- President: Sister Paula Marie Buley, I.H.M.
- Faculty: 74 full time faculty members
- Students: 2,238
- Undergraduates: 943
- Postgraduates: 770
- Doctoral students: 92
- Location: Nashua, New Hampshire, United States; 42°44′20″N 71°27′19″W
- Campus: Suburban 68 acres (0.28 km^{2})
- Colors: (Blue and white)
- Nickname: Raiders
- Sporting affiliations: NCAA Division III – GNAC
- Mascot: Raider
- Website: rivier.edu
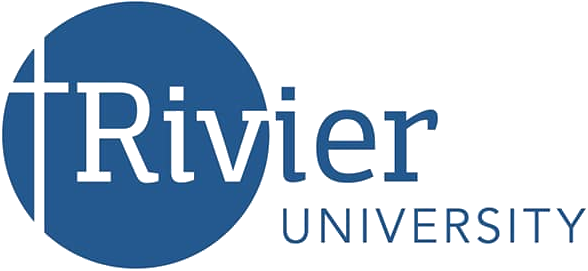

Rivier University is a private Catholic university in Nashua, New Hampshire, United States. Rivier is accredited by the New England Commission of Higher Education and approved by the New Hampshire Department of Education.

== History ==
The school, initially named "Rivier College", was founded in 1933 as by the Sisters of the Presentation of Mary in Hudson, New Hampshire. The congregation named the college in honor of its founder, Anne-Marie Rivier. In 1941, the college moved to its present campus location in Nashua. The university was incorporated in 1935 and granted the authority to offer both graduate and undergraduate level programs. The university is dedicated to Anne Marie Rivier's mission of Catholic social teaching and serving the economically disadvantaged.

On January 15, 1960, Massachusetts Senator John F. Kennedy and his wife, Jacqueline Kennedy Onassis, visited Rivier College shortly after leaving the City Hall Plaza in Nashua, where he held his first event for his candidacy for president of the United States.

In 1991, the college became coeducational, admitting its first male undergraduate students. Rivier College was renamed Rivier University on July 1, 2012.

In 1994, Rivier was sued in federal court by Mary Nedder, an assistant professor of religious studies at Rivier, under the Americans for Disabilities Act (ADA) after the university declined to renew her contract because of her weight. Jeanne Perreault, the president of Rivier at the time, allegedly made her views about overweight faculty known and in a report circulated among the faculty stated that "fat teachers do not get much respect from students." Nedder won her lawsuit and was reinstated.

Presidents of Rivier University
	Presidents	Term of office
1.	Madeleine of Jesus	1933 - 1946
2.	St. Pascal	1947 - 1953
3.	Marie-Carmella	1953 – 1955
4.	Adelard-Marie	1955 – 1957
5.	Clarice Dion	1957 – 1969
6.	Gloria Lemieux	1969 – 1973
7.	Doris Benoit	1974 – 1980
8.	Jeanne Perreault	1980 – 1997
9.	Lucille Thibodeau	1997 – 2001
10.	William Farrell	2001 - 2011
11.	Paula Marie Buley	2011–present

== Campus ==
Rivier University's campus consists of 44 buildings spread over 68 acres (28 ha) in Nashua. It has four residence halls—Trinity, Guild, Presentation, and Brassard—which accommodate 421 students.

Rivier offers intercollegiate club sports and has a student activities office, a multicultural office, counseling center, career development center, and campus ministry. Rivier has a chapter of Habitat for Humanity. There is a Model United Nations Club, a Business Club, a Biology Club, an Alliance Club (Gay-Straight Alliance), and numerous other organizations. Club membership is open to any interested student. Student clubs and activities are student-run, some with faculty advisors. Club funding is delineated through the school's Student Government Association.

== Academics ==
Rivier University enrolls approximately 2,500 students. It includes the school of undergraduate studies, which includes traditional day programs, a professional studies division for undergraduate online and evening programs, and the school of graduate studies. Rivier is a member of the New Hampshire College & University Council, a consortium of institutions of higher learning. The university offers traditional courses, online courses, and hybrid courses.

== Athletics ==
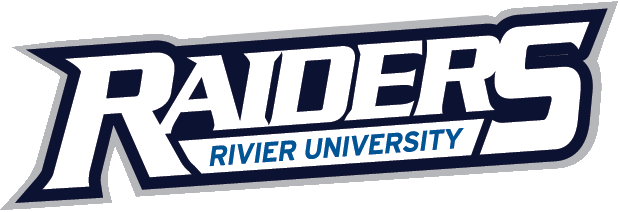
Rivier Raiders wordmark

Rivier University teams (nicknamed the Raiders) participate as a member of the National Collegiate Athletic Association's Division III. The Raiders are a member of the Great Northeast Athletic Conference (GNAC). Men's sports include baseball, basketball, cross country, ice hockey, lacrosse, soccer and volleyball; while women's sports include basketball, cross country, field hockey, ice hockey, lacrosse, soccer, softball and volleyball.

In 2020, Marika Lyszczyk, a player from Canada, became the first woman to catch in a men's college baseball game while playing for Rivier University.

== Notable faculty ==
- Herman T. Tavani - scholar in information and computer ethics, and professor emeritus of philosophy.

== Notable alumni ==
- Robert A. Baines - mayor of Manchester, New Hampshire, college professor, educator
- Skip Cleaver - politician, USMC veteran
- David Danielson - politician, New Hampshire Army National Guard veteran
- Ivan Edwards (physician) - pastor, USAF flight surgeon, community activist, CEO
- Donnalee Lozeau - politician, first female mayor of Nashua, New Hampshire
- Cindy Rosenwald - politician, educator
- Frank Snow - politician, businessman, USAF veteran, US Customs inspector
- John Sibley Williams - poet, educator, journal editor
