= Donnalee Lozeau =

American politician

55th Mayor of Nashua
- In office 2007–2015
- Succeeded by: Jim Donchess

Member of the New Hampshire House of Representatives from the Hillsborough 32nd district
- In office 1984–2000

Personal details
- Born: 15 September 1960 (age 66) Nashua, New Hampshire, U.S.
- Party: Republican

Donnalee Lozeau was the mayor of Nashua, New Hampshire, from 2007 to 2015. She was Nashua's first female mayor. Prior to becoming mayor she was a New Hampshire State Representative for sixteen years.

== Life and career ==
Mayor Lozeau, a third-generation Nashua native, attended public schools and Rivier College, and she did not graduate. Lozeau and her husband of 25 years, David, have three children and two grandchildren. Donnalee began her public service at the age of 24 being elected to the New Hampshire House of Representatives in 1984. She served 8 terms as a citizen legislator representing Nashua’s Ward 5. She served as Deputy Speaker to Speaker Donna Sytek. From 1994 to 2008 Mayor Lozeau was Director of Program and Community Development at Southern New Hampshire Services. Donnalee Lozeau currently serves as Executive Director of Southern New Hampshire Services, Inc.

Her mother Evelyn Marguerite Burton (1932–2024) was a Republican Party campaigner.

== See also ==
- List of mayors of Nashua, New Hampshire
