= New Hampshire College & University Council =

The New Hampshire College & University Council (NHCUC) is a non-profit association of public and private colleges and universities located in the U.S. state of New Hampshire. Established in 1966, the NHCUC coordinates collaborative initiatives among its member schools, sponsors professional development conferences for faculty and administrators, promotes greater awareness to the general public of higher education opportunities in the state, and provides a discussion forum for administrators of its member schools. The NHCUC also manages Visit NH Colleges, an online information resource for high school students and guidance counselors.

The NHCUC also collaborates on an initiative to help retain New Hampshire's younger workforce by connecting college students to job opportunities within the state. This is part of a statewide effort to encourage students to live and work in New Hampshire after graduation.

== Members ==
The NHCUC consists of the following schools:

- Antioch University New England
- Colby-Sawyer College
- Community College System of New Hampshire
- Franklin Pierce University
- Granite State College
- Hellenic American University
- Keene State College
- Massachusetts College of Pharmacy and Health Sciences (Manchester, NH campus)
- New England College
- Plymouth State University
- Rivier University
- Saint Anselm College
- Southern New Hampshire University
- University of New Hampshire

== See also ==
- List of colleges and universities in New Hampshire
