= List of high schools in New Hampshire =

This is a list of high schools in the state of New Hampshire.

School	City/Town	County
Academy for Science and Design	Nashua	Hillsborough
Alvirne High School	Hudson	Hillsborough
Bedford High School	Bedford	Hillsborough
Belmont High School	Belmont	Belknap
Berlin High School	Berlin	Coos
Bishop Brady High School	Concord	Merrimack
Bishop Guertin High School	Nashua	Hillsborough
Bow High School	Bow	Merrimack
Brewster Academy	Wolfeboro	Carroll
Campbell High School	Litchfield	Hillsborough
Claremont Christian Academy	Claremont	Sullivan
Cocheco Arts and Technology Academy	Dover	Strafford
Coe-Brown Northwood Academy	Northwood	Rockingham
Colebrook Academy	Colebrook	Coos
Compass Classical Academy	Franklin	Merrimack
Conant High School	Jaffrey	Cheshire
Concord Christian Academy	Concord	Merrimack
Concord High School	Concord	Merrimack
ConVal Regional High School	Peterborough	Hillsborough
The Derryfield School	Manchester	Hillsborough
Dover High School	Dover	Strafford
Dublin Christian Academy	Dublin	Cheshire
Dublin School	Dublin	Cheshire
Epping High School	Epping	Rockingham
Exeter High School	Exeter	Rockingham
Fall Mountain Regional High School	Langdon	Sullivan
Farmington Senior High School	Farmington	Strafford
The Founders Academy Charter School	Manchester	Hillsborough
Franklin High School	Franklin	Merrimack
Gilford High School	Gilford	Belknap
Goffstown High School	Goffstown	Hillsborough
Gorham High School	Gorham	Coos
Granite State Arts Academy	Salem	Rockingham
Great Bay eLearning Charter School	Exeter	Rockingham
Groveton High School	Groveton	Coos
Hanover High School	Hanover	Grafton
High Mowing School	Wilton	Hillsborough
Hillsboro-Deering High School	Hillsborough	Hillsborough
Hinsdale High School	Hinsdale	Cheshire
Holderness School	Plymouth	Grafton
Hollis/Brookline High School	Hollis	Hillsborough
Holy Family Academy	Manchester	Hillsborough
Hopkinton High School	Hopkinton	Merrimack
Inter-Lakes Middle High School	Meredith	Belknap
Jesse Remington High School	Candia	Rockingham
John Stark Regional High School	Weare	Hillsborough
Kearsarge Regional High School	Sutton	Merrimack
Keene High School	Keene	Cheshire
Kennett High School	Conway	Carroll
Kimball Union Academy	Meriden	Sullivan
King Street School	Woodsville	Grafton
Kingswood Regional High School	Wolfeboro	Carroll
Laconia Christian School	Laconia	Belknap
Laconia High School	Laconia	Belknap
Lebanon High School	Lebanon	Grafton
Ledyard Charter School	Lebanon	Grafton
Lin-Wood Public School	Lincoln	Grafton
Lisbon Regional School	Lisbon	Grafton
Littleton High School	Littleton	Grafton
Londonderry High School	Londonderry	Rockingham
Longview School at the Summit Center	Deerfield	Rockingham
Making Community Connections Charter School	Manchester	Hillsborough
Manchester Central High School	Manchester	Hillsborough
Manchester High School West	Manchester	Hillsborough
Manchester Memorial High School	Manchester	Hillsborough
Manchester School of Technology	Manchester	Hillsborough
Mascenic Regional High School	New Ipswich	Hillsborough
Mascoma Valley Regional High School	West Canaan	Grafton
Merrimack High School	Merrimack	Hillsborough
Merrimack Valley High School	Concord	Merrimack
Milford High School	Milford	Hillsborough
Monadnock Regional High School	Swanzey	Cheshire
Moultonborough Academy	Moultonborough	Carroll
Mount Royal Academy	Sunapee	Sullivan
Mount Zion Christian Schools	Manchester	Hillsborough
Nashua Christian Academy	Nashua	Hillsborough
Nashua High School North	Nashua	Hillsborough
Nashua High School South	Nashua	Hillsborough
New Hampton School	New Hampton	Belknap
New Heights Charter Academy	Goffstown	Hillsborough
Newfound Regional High School	Bristol	Grafton
Newmarket Junior-Senior High School	Newmarket	Rockingham
Newport High School	Newport	Sullivan
Next Charter School	Derry	Rockingham
North Country Charter Academy	Littleton / Lancaster	Grafton / Coos
Nute High School	Milton	Strafford
Oliverian School	Haverhill	Grafton
Oyster River High School	Durham	Strafford
PACE Career Academy Charter School	Pembroke	Merrimack
Parker Academy	Concord	Merrimack
Pelham High School	Pelham	Hillsborough
Pembroke Academy	Pembroke	Merrimack
Phillips Exeter Academy	Exeter	Rockingham
Pinkerton Academy	Derry	Rockingham
Pittsburg School	Pittsburg	Coos
Pittsfield High School	Pittsfield	Merrimack
Plymouth Regional High School	Plymouth	Grafton
Portsmouth Christian Academy	Dover	Strafford
Portsmouth High School	Portsmouth	Rockingham
Proctor Academy	Andover	Merrimack
Profile Senior High School	Bethlehem	Grafton
Prospect Mountain High School	Alton	Belknap
Raymond High School	Raymond	Rockingham
Rivendell Academy	Orford	Grafton
Saint Paul's School	Concord	Merrimack
Saint Thomas Aquinas High School	Dover	Strafford
Salem High School	Salem	Rockingham
Sanborn Regional High School	Kingston	Rockingham
Shortridge Academy	Milton	Strafford
Somersworth High School	Somersworth	Strafford
Souhegan High School	Amherst	Hillsborough
Spark Academy of Advanced Technologies	Manchester	Hillsborough
Spaulding High School	Rochester	Strafford
Stevens High School	Claremont	Sullivan
Sunapee Middle–High School	Sunapee	Sullivan
Tilton School	Tilton	Belknap
Timberlane Regional High School	Plaistow	Rockingham
Tri-City Christian Academy	Somersworth	Strafford
Trinity Christian School	Concord	Merrimack
Trinity High School	Manchester	Hillsborough
White Mountain School	Bethlehem	Grafton
White Mountains Regional High School	Whitefield	Coos
Wilton-Lyndeboro Cooperative High School	Wilton	Hillsborough
Windham High School	Windham	Rockingham
Winnacunnet High School	Hampton	Rockingham
Winnisquam Regional High School	Tilton	Belknap
Woodsville High School	Woodsville	Grafton
Virtual Learning Academy Charter School	Exeter	Rockingham

== See also ==
- List of school districts in New Hampshire
- List of colleges and universities in New Hampshire
