= NHIAA Football past divisional alignments =

Interschool competition in New Hampshire

This article lists past divisional alignments of NHIAA Football—the sport of high school football overseen by the New Hampshire Interscholastic Athletic Association (NHIAA) in the U.S. state of New Hampshire.

== 2012 division memberships ==
=== Division I ===
- Concord
- Exeter
- Londonderry
- Manchester Central
- Manchester Memorial
- Nashua North
- Nashua South
- Pinkerton
- Salem

=== Division II ===
- Bedford
- Bishop Guertin
- Dover
- Keene
- Manchester West
- Merrimack
- Spaulding
- Timberlane
- Winnacunnet

=== Division III ===
- Alvirne
- ConVal
- Goffstown
- Hollis/Brookline
- Merrimack Valley
- Milford
- Pembroke
- Portsmouth
- Souhegan

=== Division IV ===
- Hanover
- John Stark
- Kennett
- Kingswood
- Laconia
- Lebanon
- Plymouth
- St. Thomas
- Trinity
- Windham

=== Division V ===
- Bow
- Epping-Newmarket
- Inter-Lakes
- Kearsarge
- Monadnock
- Pelham
- Sanborn Regional
- Somersworth
- Stevens

=== Division VI ===
- Bishop Brady
- Campbell
- Farmington
- Franklin
- Gilford
- Mascoma
- Newfound
- Newport
- Raymond
- Winnisquam

== 2008 division memberships ==
Beginning with the 2008 football season, teams were reorganized into 6 divisions based on size and location: I-VI.

=== Division I ===
- Concord
- Londonderry
- Manchester Central
- Manchester Memorial
- Manchester West
- Nashua North
- Nashua South
- Pinkerton
- Salem

=== Division II ===
- Alvirne
- Bishop Guertin
- Dover
- Exeter
- Keene
- Merrimack
- Spaulding
- Timberlane
- Winnacunnet

=== Division III ===
- Bedford
- ConVal
- Goffstown
- Hollis/Brookline
- John Stark
- Milford
- Pembroke
- Portsmouth
- Souhegan

=== Division IV ===
- Hanover
- Kennett
- Kingswood
- Laconia
- Lebanon
- Merrimack Valley
- Monadnock
- Plymouth
- Sanborn

=== Division V ===
- Bishop Brady
- Bow
- Epping-Newmarket
- Kearsarge
- Pelham
- Somersworth
- St. Thomas
- Stevens
- Trinity

=== Division VI ===
- Campbell
- Fall Mountain
- Farmington
- Franklin
- Gilford
- Inter-Lakes
- Mascoma
- Newfound
- Newport
- Winnisquam

== 2006-2007 division memberships ==
For the 2006 and 2007 football seasons, teams were divided into 5 divisions based on size and location: I-V.

=== Division I ===
- Concord
- Londonderry
- Manchester Central
- Manchester Memorial
- Manchester West
- Nashua North
- Nashua South
- Pinkerton
- Salem
- Trinity*
- Trinity played an independent schedule for the year 2007.

=== Division II ===
- Alvirne
- Bishop Guertin
- Dover
- Exeter
- Goffstown
- Keene
- Merrimack
- Spaulding
- Timberlane
- Winnacunnet

=== Division III ===
- ConVal
- John Stark
- Kennett
- Kingswood
- Merrimack Valley
- Milford
- Pembroke
- Plymouth
- Portsmouth
- Souhegan

=== Division IV ===
- Fall Mountain
- Hanover
- Hollis/Brookline
- Kearsarge
- Laconia
- Lebanon
- Monadnock
- Somersworth
- St. Thomas
- Stevens

=== Division V ===
- Bishop Brady
- Bow
- Campbell
- Epping
- Farmington
- Franklin
- Gilford
- Newfound
- Newport
- Pelham
- Winnisquam
