= NHIAA Football =

Interschool competition in New Hampshire

Logo of the 2023 NHIAA Football State Championships

NHIAA Football is the sport of high school football overseen by the New Hampshire Interscholastic Athletic Association (NHIAA) in the U.S. state of New Hampshire. There are currently 58 high school football programs (including four multi-school co-operative teams) throughout the state.

== Division memberships ==
The NHIAA divided football into as few as three, but as many as six divisions between 1992 and 2017. There are four divisions in the state starting with the 2018 season.

(*) indicates multi-school co-op programs

=== Division I (21 teams in three divisions) ===
==== West ====
- Bedford
- Bishop Guertin
- Goffstown
- Keene
- Merrimack
- Nashua North
- Nashua South

==== Central ====
- Alvirne
- Concord
- Londonderry
- Manchester Central
- Pinkerton
- Salem
- Windham

==== East ====
- Dover
- Exeter
- Manchester Memorial
- Portsmouth-Oyster River*
- Spaulding
- Timberlane
- Winnacunnet

=== Division II (16 teams in two divisions) ===
==== East ====
- Bow
- Kennett
- Kingswood
- Merrimack Valley
- Pembroke
- Plymouth
- St. Thomas Aquinas
- Trinity

==== West ====
- ConVal
- Hanover
- Hollis Brookline
- John Stark
- Manchester West
- Milford
- Pelham
- Souhegan

=== Division III (13 teams in two division) ===
==== East ====
- Campbell
- Epping–Newmarket*
- Gilford
- Inter-Lakes–Moultonborough*
- Laconia
- Sanborn
- Somersworth

==== West ====
- Fall Mountain
- Kearsarge
- Lebanon
- Monadnock
- Newport
- Stevens

=== Division IV (8 teams in one division) ===
- Bishop Brady
- Farmington–Nute*
- Franklin
- Hillsboro-Deering
- Mascoma Valley
- Newfound
- Raymond
- Winnisquam

== State champions (1951–present) ==
NHIAA state football champions since 1951:

=== 2018–present (four divisions) ===
Year	Division I	Division II	Division III	Division IV
2025	Bedford	Trinity	Gilford	Hillsboro-Deering
2024	Pinkerton	Souhegan	Campbell	Mascoma Valley
2023	Bedford	Pelham	Trinity	Somersworth
2022	Bedford	Pelham	Campbell	Somersworth
2021	Londonderry	Timberlane	Pelham	Somersworth
2020	Nashua North	Souhegan	Pelham	Newport
2019	Londonderry	Hollis Brookline	Trinity	Winnisquam
2018	Bedford	Plymouth	Monadnock	Winnisquam

=== 2013–2017 (three divisions) ===
Year	Division I	Division II	Division III
2017	Winnacunnet	Plymouth	Campbell
2016	Bedford	Plymouth	Stevens
2015	Goffstown	St. Thomas Aquinas	Newport
2014	Pinkerton	Windham	Campbell
2013	Concord	Plymouth	Bow

=== 2008–2012 (six divisions) ===
Year	Division I	Division II	Division III	Division IV	Division V	Division VI
2012	Exeter	Winnacunnet	Portsmouth	Plymouth	Monadnock	Franklin
2011	Exeter	Bishop Guertin	Portsmouth	Trinity	St. Thomas	Inter-Lakes
2010	Pinkerton Academy	Bishop Guertin	Souhegan	Lebanon	Kearsarge	Newport
2009	Salem	Bishop Guertin	Souhegan	Plymouth	Trinity	Inter-Lakes
2008	Nashua South	Bishop Guertin	Souhegan	Plymouth	Pelham	Franklin

=== 2004–2007 (five divisions) ===
Year	Division I	Division II	Division III	Division IV	Division V
2007	Pinkerton Academy	Exeter	Plymouth	Laconia	Pelham
2006	Pinkerton Academy	Bishop Guertin	Plymouth	St. Thomas	Bishop Brady
2005	Pinkerton Academy	Bishop Guertin	Plymouth	Hanover	Bishop Brady
2004	Concord	Bishop Guertin	Souhegan	Hanover	Bow

=== 1994–2003 (four divisions) ===
Year	Division I	Division II	Division III	Division IV
2003	Manchester Central	Exeter	Plymouth	Milford
2002	Manchester Central	Exeter	Plymouth	Hanover
2001	Manchester Central	Timberlane	Plymouth	St. Thomas Aquinas
2000	Concord	Winnacunnet	Plymouth	St. Thomas Aquinas
1999	Manchester Central	Timberlane	Laconia	St. Thomas Aquinas
1998	Londonderry	Exeter	Plymouth	Bishop Brady
1997	Nashua	Exeter	Plymouth	Somersworth
1996	Londonderry	Dover	Kingswood	Somersworth
1995	Manchester Central	Salem	Laconia	Newport
1994	Pinkerton	Londonderry	Laconia	Plymouth

=== 1992–1993 (three divisions) ===
Year	Division I	Division II	Division III
1993	Pinkerton	Kennett	Somersworth
1992	Pinkerton	Kennett	Somersworth

=== 1989–1991 (three classes) ===
Year	Class L	Class I	Class M-S
1991	Pinkerton	Somersworth	Franklin
1990	Spaulding	Kennett	Newport
1989	Concord	Kennett	Newport

=== 1972–1988 (three divisions) ===
Year	Division I	Division II	Division III
1988	Trinity	Londonderry	Kennett
1987	Concord	Merrimack	Plymouth
1986	Pinkerton	Londonderry	Kennett
1985	Pinkerton	Londonderry	Plymouth
1984	Nashua	Milford	Bishop Brady
1983	Salem	Winnacunnet	Bishop Brady
1982	Spaulding	Timberlane	Newport
1981	Portsmouth	Somersworth	Bishop Brady
1980	Nashua	Somersworth	Plymouth
1979	Spaulding	Milford	Bishop Brady
1978	Nashua	Milford	Bishop Brady
1977	Portsmouth	Milford	Plymouth
1976	Portsmouth	Milford	Kingswood
1975	Salem	Bishop Guertin	Plymouth
1974	Concord	St. Thomas Aquinas	Kennett
1973	Manchester Memorial	Bishop Guertin	Newport
1972	Manchester Memorial	Somersworth	Plymouth

=== 1957–1971 (four divisions) ===
Year	Division I	Division II	Division III	Division IV
1971	Manchester Memorial	Spaulding	Bishop Guertin	Newport
1970	Manchester Central/Keene	Laconia	Bishop Guertin/Pinkerton	Bishop Brady/Newport
1969	Manchester Memorial	Laconia	Somersworth	Plymouth
1968	Manchester Central	Dover	Stevens	Hanover/Winnacunnet
1967	Portsmouth	Laconia	Somersworth	Plymouth
1966	Manchester Central	Laconia	Somersworth	Franklin
1965	Manchester Memorial	Spaulding	Exeter	Berlin
1964	Portsmouth	Laconia	Exeter	Towle*/Franklin
1963	Nashua	St. Thomas Aquinas	Exeter	Towle*
1962	Manchester Memorial	Portsmouth	Stevens	Hanover
1961	Bishop Bradley**	Portsmouth	Somersworth	Towle*
1960	Nashua	Keene	St. John's***	Littleton
1959	Nashua	Laconia	Exeter	Winnacunnet
1958	Nashua	Keene	Exeter/Pinkerton	St. Anthony's**
1957	Nashua	Spaulding	Exeter	Woodbury****

=== 1951–1956 (three classes) ===
Year	Class L	Class M	Class S
1956	(No Champion)	Pinkerton	Littleton
1955	Nashua	Exeter	St. Anthony's**
1954	Nashua	Stevens	Hampton*****
1953	Nashua	Somersworth	St. Anthony's**
1952	Nashua	Somersworth	Towle*
1951	Bishop Bradley**	Laconia	Plymouth

NOTES:

(*) Newport's Towle High School closed and was converted to an elementary school in 1966 as high school students moved into the new Newport High School.
(**) Three Manchester Catholic high schools, St. Anthony's High School, Bishop Bradley High School and Immaculata High School, closed and were merged into Trinity High School in 1970.
(***) Concord's St. John's High School was converted into an elementary/middle school in 1963 upon the opening of Bishop Brady High School.
(****) Salem's Woodbury High School was converted to a middle school upon the opening of Salem High School in 1966.
(*****) Hampton Academy and High School was converted to a junior high school (Hampton Academy) after the opening of Winnacunnet High School in 1958.
