= New Hampshire Interscholastic Athletic Association =

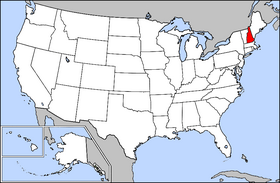
- Abbreviation: NHIAA
- Formation: 1947
- Type: Volunteer; NPO
- Legal status: Association
- Purpose: Athletic/Educational
- Headquarters: 251 Clinton St. Concord, NH 03301
- Region served: New Hampshire
- Executive Director: Jeffrey Collins
- Affiliations: National Federation of State High School Associations
- Website: nhiaa.org

The New Hampshire Interscholastic Athletic Association (NHIAA) is the governing body for sports competitions among all public and some private high schools in the U.S. state of New Hampshire. It is a member of the National Federation of State High School Associations.

== Classifications ==
Schools competing under the NHIAA are grouped into four divisions (classification thresholds as of July 1, 2026):

- Division I: over 850 students
- Division II: 550-849 students
- Division III: 281-549 students
- Division IV: 1-280 students

Schools are reclassified every two years. The classification thresholds are periodically adjusted so as to result in an approximately equal number of teams in each class. Schools may petition the NHIAA to play in a class higher than that in which they would otherwise be placed.

For most multi-division sports (e.g. football or ice hockey), competition is organized into divisions based on enrollment thresholds established by the NHIAA committee governing the individual sport (which can very based on the number of participating schools in a sport).

Classifications for the 2024–2025 and 2025–2026 seasons are as follows:

=== Division I (formerly Class L): 20 schools ===
- Alvirne (Hudson)
- Bedford
- Concord
- Dover
- Exeter
- Goffstown
- Keene
- Londonderry
- Manchester Central
- Manchester Memorial
- Merrimack
- Nashua North
- Nashua South
- Pinkerton Academy (Derry)
- Portsmouth
- Salem
- Spaulding (Rochester)
- Timberlane (Plaistow)
- Windham
- Winnacunnet (Hampton)

=== Division II (formerly Class I): 20 schools ===
- Bishop Guertin (Nashua)
- Bow
- Coe-Brown Northwood Academy
- Contoocook Valley (Peterborough)
- Hanover
- Hollis Brookline
- John Stark (Henniker)
- Kennett (North Conway)
- Kingswood (Wolfeboro)
- Laconia
- Lebanon
- Manchester West
- Merrimack Valley (Penacook)
- Milford
- Oyster River (Durham)
- Pelham
- Pembroke
- Plymouth
- Sanborn (Kingston)
- Souhegan (Amherst)

=== Division III (formerly Class M): 23 schools ===
- Belmont
- Berlin
- Campbell (Litchfield)
- Conant (Jaffrey)
- Derryfield (Manchester)
- Fall Mountain (Langdon)
- Gilford
- Hillsboro-Deering
- Hopkinton
- Inter-Lakes (Meredith)
- Kearsarge (North Sutton)
- Mascoma Valley (Canaan)
- Monadnock (Swanzey)
- Newfound (Bristol)
- Newport
- Prospect Mountain (Alton)
- Raymond
- Somersworth
- St. Thomas Aquinas (Dover)
- Stevens (Claremont)
- Trinity (Manchester)
- White Mountains (Whitefield)
- Winnisquam (Tilton)

=== Division IV (formerly Class S): 26 schools ===
- Bishop Brady (Concord)
- Canaan (Vermont)
- Colebrook
- Concord Christian
- Epping
- Farmington
- Franklin
- Gorham
- Groveton
- Hinsdale
- Holy Family (Manchester)
- Lin-Wood (Lincoln)
- Lisbon
- Littleton
- Mascenic (New Ipswich)
- Moultonborough
- Mount Royal Academy (Sunapee)
- Newmarket
- Nute (Milton)
- Pittsburg
- Pittsfield
- Portsmouth Christian
- Profile (Bethlehem)
- Sunapee
- Wilton-Lyndeborough
- Woodsville

== Sports ==
The NHIAA sanctions competitions in the following sports:

=== Fall season ===
Sport	Divisions
Bass Fishing (Co-ed)	One division
Cross Country	Three divisions (I, II, III)
Esports	One division
Field Hockey	Three divisions (I, II, III)
Football	Four divisions (I, II, III, IV)
Golf (Co-Ed)	Four divisions (I, II, III, IV)
Soccer	Four divisions (I, II, III, IV)
Spirit	Three divisions (I, II, III)
Volleyball (Girls)	Three divisions (I, II, III)

=== Winter season ===
Sport	Divisions
Basketball	Four divisions (I, II, III, IV)
Bowling (Co-ed)	One division
Gymnastics	One division
Ice hockey (Boys)	Three division (I, II, III)
Ice hockey (Girls)	One division
Indoor Track	Two divisions (I, II)
Skiing (Alpine and Nordic)	Four divisions (I, II, III, IV)
Spirit	Three divisions (I, II, III)
Swimming and Diving	Two divisions (I, II)
Wrestling	Three divisions (I, II, III)

=== Spring season ===
Sport	Divisions
Baseball	Four divisions (I, II, III, IV)
Lacrosse (Boys) and Girls	Three divisions (I, II, III)
Softball	Four divisions (I, II, III, IV)
Tennis (Boys) and (Girls)	Three divisions (I, II, III)
Track and field	Three divisions (I, II, III)
Volleyball (Boys)	One division

== See also ==
- NHIAA Football
