= KRHS =

KRHS may refer to:

- KRHS (FM), a radio station (90.1 FM) licensed to serve Overland, Missouri, United States
- Kenton Ridge High School, Springfield, Ohio, United States
- Kingswood Regional High School, Wolfeboro, New Hampshire, United States
- Kittatinny Regional High School, Newton, New Jersey, United States
- Theodore Roosevelt High School (Kent, Ohio), United States, often called "Kent Roosevelt High School"
