= MRSD =

MRSD may stand for:

- Mainland Regional School District in Linwood, New Jersey, USA
- Manchester Regional School District in Haledon, New Jersey, USA
- Monadnock Regional School District in Swanzey, New Hampshire, USA
- Monmouth Regional School District in Tinton Falls, New Jersey, USA
- Masters in Robotic Systems Development at Carnegie Mellon University
