= Plaistow, New Hampshire =

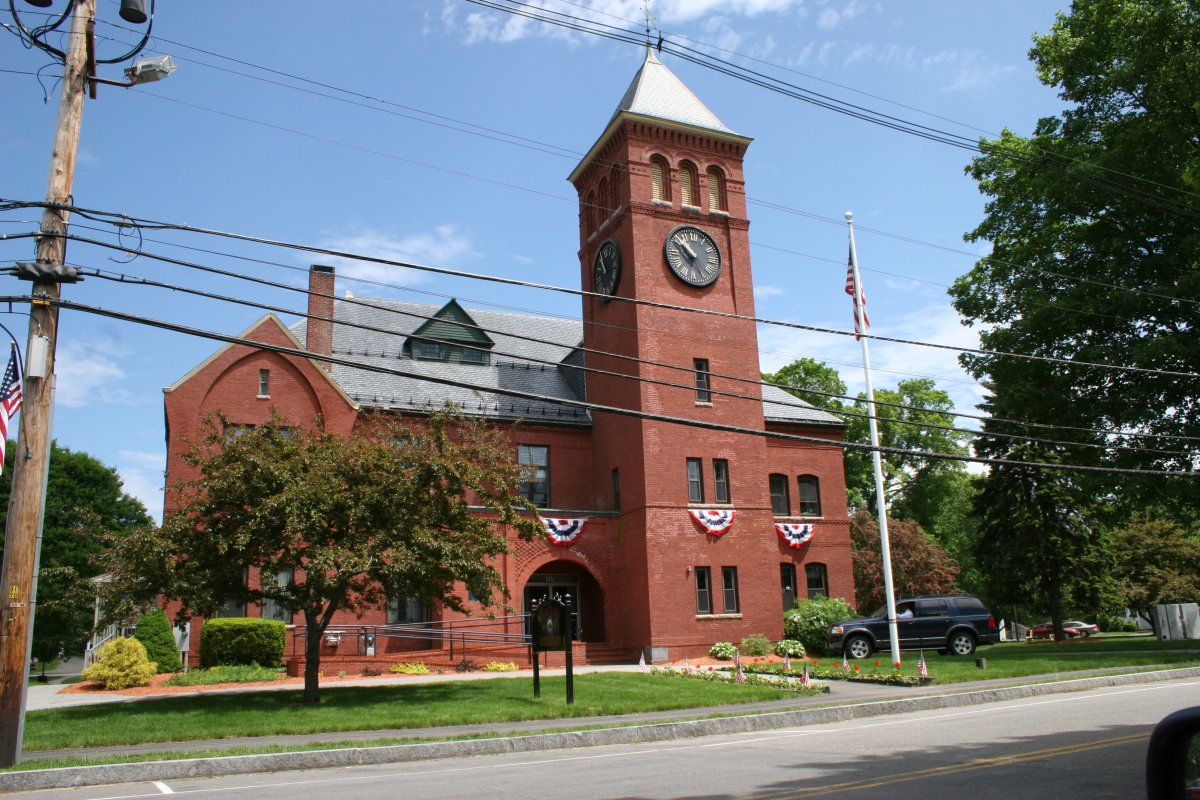
- Plaistow Town Hall

- Seal

- Location in Rockingham County and the state of New Hampshire.
- Coordinates: 42°50′25″N 71°05′46″W
- Country: United States
- State: New Hampshire
- County: Rockingham
- Incorporated: 1749
- Villages: Plaistow; Westville

Area
  - Total: 10.60 sq mi (27.45 km^{2})
  - Land: 10.59 sq mi (27.43 km^{2})
  - Water: 0.0077 sq mi (0.02 km^{2}) 0.06%
- Elevation: 102 ft (31 m)

Population (2020)
  - Total: 7,830
  - Density: 739/sq mi (285.4/km^{2})
- Time zone: UTC-5 (Eastern)
  - Summer (DST): UTC-4 (Eastern)
- ZIP code: 03865
- Area code: 603
- FIPS code: 33-62500
- GNIS feature ID: 873701
- Website: www.plaistow.com

Plaistow (/ˈplæstaʊ/, traditionally /-toʊ/) is a town in Rockingham County, New Hampshire, United States. The population was 7,830 at the 2020 census.

== History ==
The land of what is now Plaistow was originally allocated to Haverhill, Massachusetts, as a part of Old Norfolk County. When New Hampshire was separated by decree of King Charles II in 1679, the portion of Haverhill north of the new border was incorporated into the new province.

Plaistow was officially established as a town in 1749 after the 1739 resolution of a long-running boundary dispute between the Province of Massachusetts Bay and the Province of New Hampshire. It is the only town outside the United Kingdom with the name Plaistow. In 1776 the western part of Plaistow became a separate town, Atkinson.

The present town hall was built in 1895. Each year, the town celebrates "Old Home Day", with a parade that travels down Main Street through Plaistow village, fireworks at the local high school, and a carnival-type atmosphere on the Town Hall lawn to celebrate the town's anniversary.

== Geography ==
According to the United States Census Bureau, the town has a total area of 10.60 square miles (27.45 km^{2}), of which 0.01 square miles (0.02 km^{2}), or 0.06%, are water. The highest point in Plaistow is an unnamed summit at 384 feet (117 m) above sea level near the town's northern end. The town is drained by the Little River, a south-flowing tributary of the Merrimack River in Massachusetts.

=== Adjacent municipalities ===
- Kingston (north)
- Newton (northeast)
- Merrimac, Massachusetts (east at one point)
- Haverhill, Massachusetts (south)
- Atkinson (west)
- Hampstead (northwest)

== Demographics ==
Historical population
Census	Pop.	Note	%±
1790	521		—
1800	459		−11.9%
1810	424		−7.6%
1820	492		16.0%
1830	591		20.1%
1840	626		5.9%
1850	748		19.5%
1860	861		15.1%
1870	879		2.1%
1880	1,062		20.8%
1890	1,085		2.2%
1900	1,027		−5.3%
1910	1,173		14.2%
1920	1,368		16.6%
1930	1,366		−0.1%
1940	1,414		3.5%
1950	2,082		47.2%
1960	2,915		40.0%
1970	4,712		61.6%
1980	5,609		19.0%
1990	7,316		30.4%
2000	7,747		5.9%
2010	7,609		−1.8%
2020	7,830		2.9%
U.S. Decennial Census

As of the census of 2000, there were 7,747 people, 2,871 households, and 2,150 families residing in the town. The population density was 728.8 inhabitants per square mile (281.4/km^{2}). There were 2,927 housing units at an average density of 275.4 per square mile (106.3/km^{2}). The racial makeup of the town was 98.33% White, 0.21% African American, 0.10% Native American, 0.50% Asian, 0.30% from other races, and 0.56% from two or more races. Hispanic or Latino of any race were 1.32% of the population.

There were 2,871 households, out of which 35.6% had children under the age of 18 living with them, 60.1% were married couples living together, 10.7% had a female householder with no husband present, and 25.1% were non-families. 19.1% of all households were made up of individuals, and 6.0% had someone living alone who was 65 years of age or older. The average household size was 2.69 and the average family size was 3.10.

In the town, the population was spread out, with 25.8% under the age of 18, 7.0% from 18 to 24, 32.0% from 25 to 44, 25.0% from 45 to 64, and 10.1% who were 65 years of age or older. The median age was 37 years. For every 100 females, there were 95.7 males. For every 100 females age 18 and over, there were 94.9 males.

The median income for a household in the town was $61,707, and the median income for a family was $66,852. Males had a median income of $45,756 versus $31,657 for females. The per capita income for the town was $25,255. About 2.1% of families and 3.2% of the population were below the poverty line, including 1.4% of those under age 18 and 7.5% of those age 65 or over.

== Education ==
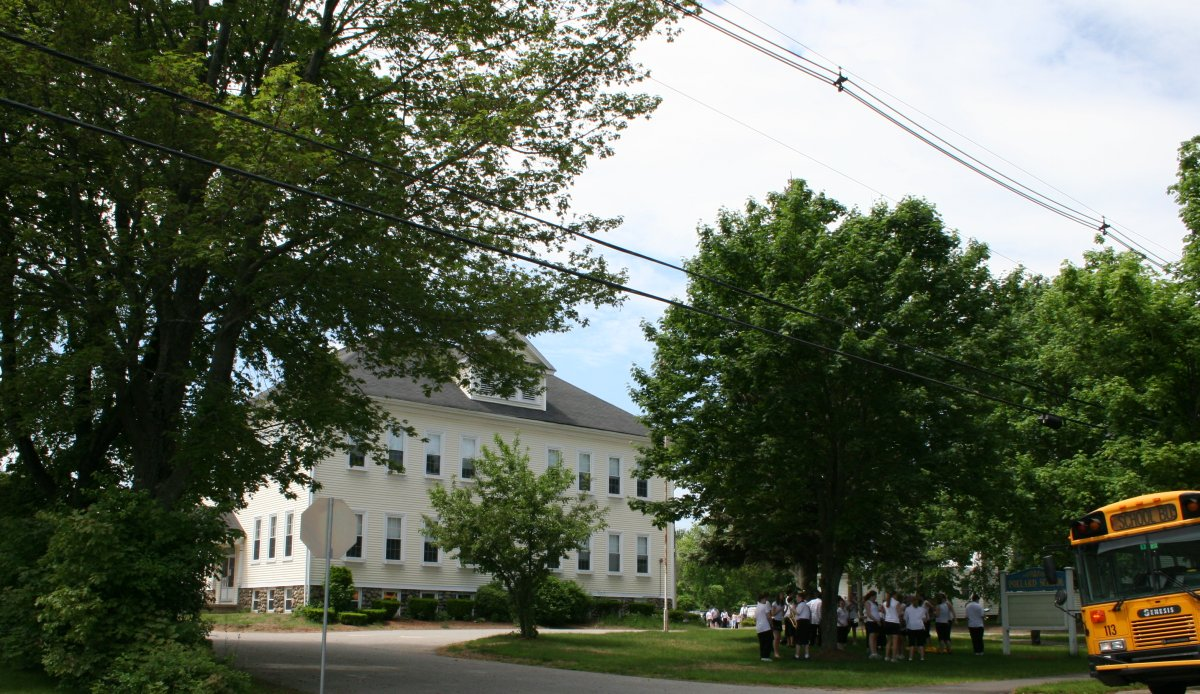
Pollard Elementary School, May 2006

Plaistow is home to Timberlane Regional High School (grades 9–12) and Timberlane Regional Middle School (grades 6–8), which serve as middle and high school for the towns of Plaistow, Atkinson, Danville and Sandown. Plaistow is also home to Pollard Elementary School, which serves only Plaistow children from kindergarten to grade 5.

Timberlane Regional High School has had noticeable success in music, theatrical performance, wrestling, and softball. The school offers access to vocational programs at Salem High School and Pinkerton Academy. Timberlane students participating in the program start during the 11th grade and spend two to three periods a day at either Salem or Pinkerton. Upon graduation, the participating students receive an associate's degree along with a high school diploma.

== Economy and transportation ==
Plaistow's economy is centered along New Hampshire Route 125 (Plaistow Road), a north–south road that connects the town with Haverhill, Massachusetts, to the south and Kingston, Epping, and Rochester, New Hampshire, to the north. Local businesses and numerous large chain stores are located along Route 125, which has become known for problems with heavy traffic during weekday commuting and weekend shopping hours. Route 125 intersects with Interstate 495 in Massachusetts 2 miles (3 km) south of the center of Plaistow.

Route 121A (Main Street) runs north to south through the center of Plaistow, as a local route. It crosses NH 125 north of the center of town and terminates at the Massachusetts border, where the road continues south for a few yards before terminating at Massachusetts Route 125. NH 121A leads north through East Hampstead and Sandown to Chester. New Hampshire Route 108 runs north to south along the eastern edge of Plaistow, just 0.1 miles (0.16 km) west of the Massachusetts border. Route 108 leads north to Newton and Exeter and south to the center of Haverhill. NH 121 crosses the extreme southwestern corner of town for about 1000 feet. It leads west into Atkinson and terminates to the southeast at the Massachusetts border, where the road continues into Haverhill as North Main Street.

Pan Am Railways (formerly the Boston and Maine Railroad) operates the main railroad line from Boston to Portland, Maine, which is utilized by Amtrak and by freight trains, running through Plaistow. Passenger stations for the Amtrak Downeaster are available in Haverhill to the south and Exeter to the north. A proposal to extend existing MBTA commuter rail service from Boston through Haverhill into Plaistow concluded in 2015 with the decision not to extend the route at this time.

MVRTA bus 13 runs from the center of Haverhill to Wal-Mart on Route 125.

== Notable people ==
- Shem Kellogg (1982–2016), New Hampshire legislator
- Daniel Peaslee (1773–1827), Vermont legislator, judge
- Thomas Toth, Canadian runner
