= Virtual Learning Academy Charter School =

Virtual high school in New Hampshire, US

Coordinates: 42.976408°N 70.955296°W

Virtual Learning Academy

Location
- 30 Linden Street; Exeter, New Hampshire; United States

Information
- School type: State Public Charter School
- Founded: 2007
- Founder: Steve Kossakoski
- Grades: 6 - 11
- Enrolment: 13,000+ (2010)
- School fees: Free for New Hampshire residents
- Website: vlacs.org

Virtual Learning Academy Charter School (VLACS) is a nonprofit virtual charter school in Exeter, New Hampshire, the only public online high school in the state. It offers full-time and part-time admissions. The school was founded in 2007 by Steve Kossakoski, who holds a doctorate in education administration from University of New Hampshire. VLACS is licensed by the New Hampshire Board of Education, making it free to students under 21 living in the state. Students living in other states, however, must pay to use it. In 2010, they had 13,432 students enrolled in High and Middle School courses.

== Notable alumni ==
- Taylor Wenczkowski, ice hockey player
