= Bedford High School (New Hampshire) =

Location
- 47B Nashua Road; Bedford, New Hampshire 03110; United States; 42°56′10″N 71°30′58″W

Information
- School type: Public High School
- Founded: 2007
- School district: Bedford School District
- Superintendent: Michael Fournier
- CEEB code: 300044
- Principal: Dan Morris
- Staff: 101.80 (FTE)
- Grades: 9–12
- Enrollment: 1,398 (2023–2024)
- Student to teacher ratio: 13.73
- Language: English
- Colors: Red, Black, Silver, and White
- Athletics conference: NHIAA; Division I
- Mascot: Bulldogs
- Accreditation: NEASC
- Newspaper: BHS Unleashed
- Communities served: Bedford, NH
- Feeder schools: Ross A. Lurgio Middle School
- Website: www.bedfordhighschool.org

Bedford High School is a public high school in the town of Bedford, New Hampshire, United States. The high school adjoins the town's Ross A. Lurgio Middle School (7th and 8th grades). The combined schools are situated on a 40-acre (160,000 m^{2}) campus at 47 Nashua Road. The two schools share an 810-seat theatre, a 2000-seat gymnasium, a FieldTurf football field and a synthetic 400-meter track. The approximate cost for constructing this facility in combination with Lurgio was $50 million.

Bedford High School's mascot is the bulldog, which was determined from a polling by the 5th, 6th, 7th, and 8th graders in early 2006. The polling also determined the school colors, which are red, black, and silver.

BHS students read books such as The Great Gatsby, Heart of Darkness, Slaughterhouse Five, Fahrenheit 451, The Kite Runner, Animal Farm, The Destructors, All Summer In A Day, Death Of A Salesman, and are allowed to choose between The Adoration Of Jenna Fox, The Absolutely True Diary of a Part-Time Indian, and Lord of the Flies as choice novels.

Bedford's sports program was recognized as the 20th best in the nation by maxpreps.com in 2013–14.

The school employs a two-level system, which are the PSP level and the AP/IB/Honors level. This was based on a general consensus taken in the fall of 2006. The school also offers rigorous Advanced Placement courses and IB courses for students. Bedford High was the first school in the state of New Hampshire to offer IB classes, and the first group of IB Diploma students graduated with the rest of the first senior class in June 2010. A total of 11 seniors earned the IB Diploma.

== History ==
Before construction of the high school, Bedford's students were tuitioned to Manchester West High School, an arrangement that had been in place since 1923.

The high school began teaching in the 2007-2008 school year, with an enrollment of 550 students (freshmen and sophomores only). For the 2009-2010 year, the school accommodated all four classes (freshmen through seniors), and total enrollment reached 1,250 students. The first class to attend four years and graduate from Bedford High School was the class of 2011.

The first principal of the school, from 2007 to 2009, was George H. Edwards Jr., who was previously the principal at Bow High School in nearby Bow, New Hampshire. The current principal is Dan Morris.

== Campus ==
BHS has a large theatre with seating for 820 people. The school provides choir, band, and art classes. As an afterschool club, BHS Theatre Company does two to three productions a year, including musicals and straight plays.

== Academics ==
As of 2022 the foreign languages offered include American Sign Language, French, Latin, and Spanish.

The BHS math team has, since its birth in 2009, attained 2nd place in the NH SMASH meet in 2012, and then 2nd again the next year in the next division.

== Athletics ==
The BHS boys' tennis team won eleven consecutive state titles from 2010 to 2021, the most consecutive state titles in NH boys' tennis history.

From April 13, 2012, to May 11, 2012, the BHS lacrosse team won 72 consecutive games, tied for third for the nation's most consecutive wins in boys' lacrosse history. In 2010, only their second varsity season, the team was runner-up in the state championship game, losing in overtime to Bow High School. The varsity program had three back-to-back Division II state titles for the 2011-2012, 2012-2013, and 2013-2014 seasons.

Other teams which have won state championships since the school's founding include football, cheerleading, golf, girls' swimming, soccer (both girls' and boys' teams), boys' wrestling, basketball,(both boys and girls) girls' tennis, track and field (both boys and girls) and boys' cross country.

The Bulldogs football team won back to back New Hampshire state championships in 2022-2023. The Bulldogs also won the state championship in 2025.

== Intersession ==
The two days before April Break (Spring Break) are known as Intersession. Students can choose from a wide range of activities from local hiking trips to a 13-day getaway to Italy.

== Notable alumni ==
- Josh Bauer, professional soccer player
- Grant Lavigne, baseball player
