= Kennett High School (New Hampshire) =

Location
- 409 Eagles Way, North Conway, NH, 03860; USA; 44°0′19″N 71°5′53″W

Information
- Type: Free public
- Established: 1923
- School district: Conway School District
- Principal: Kevin Carpenter
- Grades: 9 - 12
- Enrollment: 696 (2023-2024)
- Campus type: Rural
- Colors: Black and white
- Mascot: Eagle
- Website: khs.sau9.org

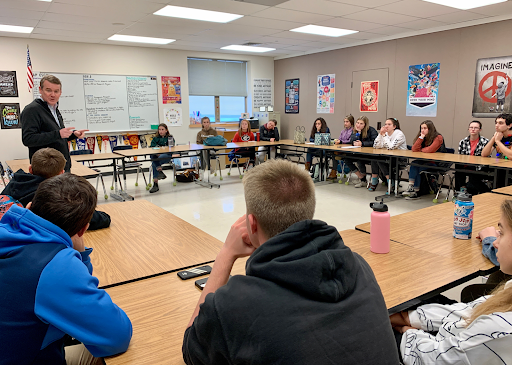
Presidential candidate Michael Bennet answering questions presented by students during a social studies class at Kennett in 2020.

Kennett High School is a high school in North Conway, New Hampshire, near the village of Redstone. The present school building opened in 2007, replacing the former A. Crosby Kennett High School (built in 1923) located at 176 Main Street in Conway, which is now a middle school. Kennett High School serves the towns of Conway, Albany, Bartlett, Eaton, Freedom, Hart's Location, Jackson, Madison, and Tamworth.

== Education ==
Kennett has several departments, including English, Mathematics, Foreign Languages, Science, and Arts. The school also has a Career-Tech department, which includes several shops and classrooms fitted with technology. These rooms are often looked at as a key point of the new school building. The department includes a woodshop, a metal shop, an auto shop, a drafting and architecture room and a kitchen where culinary students are able to serve food to the public in the "Mineral Springs Cafe". The school has been working to improve its SAT scores and is now ahead of several national averages for testing standards, and has also lowered the dropout rate since 2007–2008, the first year in the new building.

In 2020, Kennett High School started inviting Presidential primary candidates to speak with students in government and social studies classes. Candidates that visited the school included Elizabeth Warren, John Delaney and Michael Bennet.

== Performing arts ==
The school's performing arts department includes several groups of varying sizes: Symphonic Band, Stage Band, Drumline, "Odd's 'n Ends" Jazz Ensemble, Select Choir, Chorus, A Cappella choir, Marching Band and Dance Team. Several of the groups have performed around the Northeast and even in Canada. The Marching Band attends the Band Day at the University of Massachusetts Amherst annually and also performs at local parades, sporting events and fairs. The Dance Team has performed in TD Garden in Boston during a Boston Celtics basketball game, and has also won several awards in competitions around the Northeast. The Stage Band has traveled to several cities, including Providence, Boston, and Montreal. The Kennett Drumline has also participated in many events throughout the area. They were chosen in 2009–10 to perform at the New Hampshire Music Educators Conference, and also to answer questions about setting up similar drumlines at other schools. The line performs regular shows in the spring of each school year, using different themes and acts. Several members of the department have also competed in prestigious festivals like New Hampshire All State (both band and chorus members), All New England Honors Band, and even national honor bands. The performing arts groups rehearse and play in the school's Loynd Auditorium.

== Athletics ==
Kennett's athletics program has won many titles and awards since the school was created. As a member of the NHIAA, the school competes against many schools from across the state, including Berlin High School, Monadnock Regional High School, Trinity High School, and their rival Kingswood Regional High School in Wolfeboro. In recent years, the winter season teams have been particularly successful. The ice hockey team won division state championships in 2008–09, 2011–2012, 2016–17 and finished runners up in 2010–11, 2017–18. The ski team has also been successful, winning Alpine and Nordic Boys, Alpine Girls, Combined and Jumping titles in recent years (New Hampshire is the only state with high school ski jumping competition). The girls' basketball team won the state championship in 2009–10. In 2010–11, the field hockey team won their state championship. The football team has been consistently qualifying for playoff games in recent years, and is known for ending the Plymouth Regional High School football team's national record streak of 57 wins in 2010. The football team plays its home games on Friday nights at Gary Millen Stadium, named after a late teacher and football coach at the school. The stadium also houses the Livingston Oval, named for the current track and cross country coach, Bernie Livingston, for track events and sometimes serves as a soccer field during the fall season. The school's tennis, cross country and track teams have also won titles in the past. The baseball and softball teams have also done well during recent years. The combined titles of the ski teams total more than all of the other sports at the school combined.

Since the new school was built, a coed mountain biking team and both boys' and girls' lacrosse teams have been adopted to the program.

== Clubs and activities ==
Kennett offers several clubs and activities to students. These include an FBLA club, a DECA club, a health-awareness club, and a Key Club. The Key Club has won a record number of competitions in a row, and continues to send students to the national gatherings.

== Notable alumni ==
- Gordon Clapp, Emmy Award-winning actor, best known for his work as Detective Greg Medavoy on NYPD Blue
- Sean Doherty, 2014 biathlon athlete Olympics; graduated 2013
- Jeff Locke, starting pitcher for the Pittsburgh Pirates of Major League Baseball; graduated 2006
- Don Orsillo (Kennett Middle School), play-by-play announcer for the Boston Red Sox on New England Sports Network (NESN)
- Leanne Smith, 2010 and 2014 Olympic downhill athlete; graduated 2005
