= Sunapee Middle–High School =

High school in New Hampshire, United States

Coordinates: 43°23′16″N 72°05′53″W

Sunapee Middle-High School
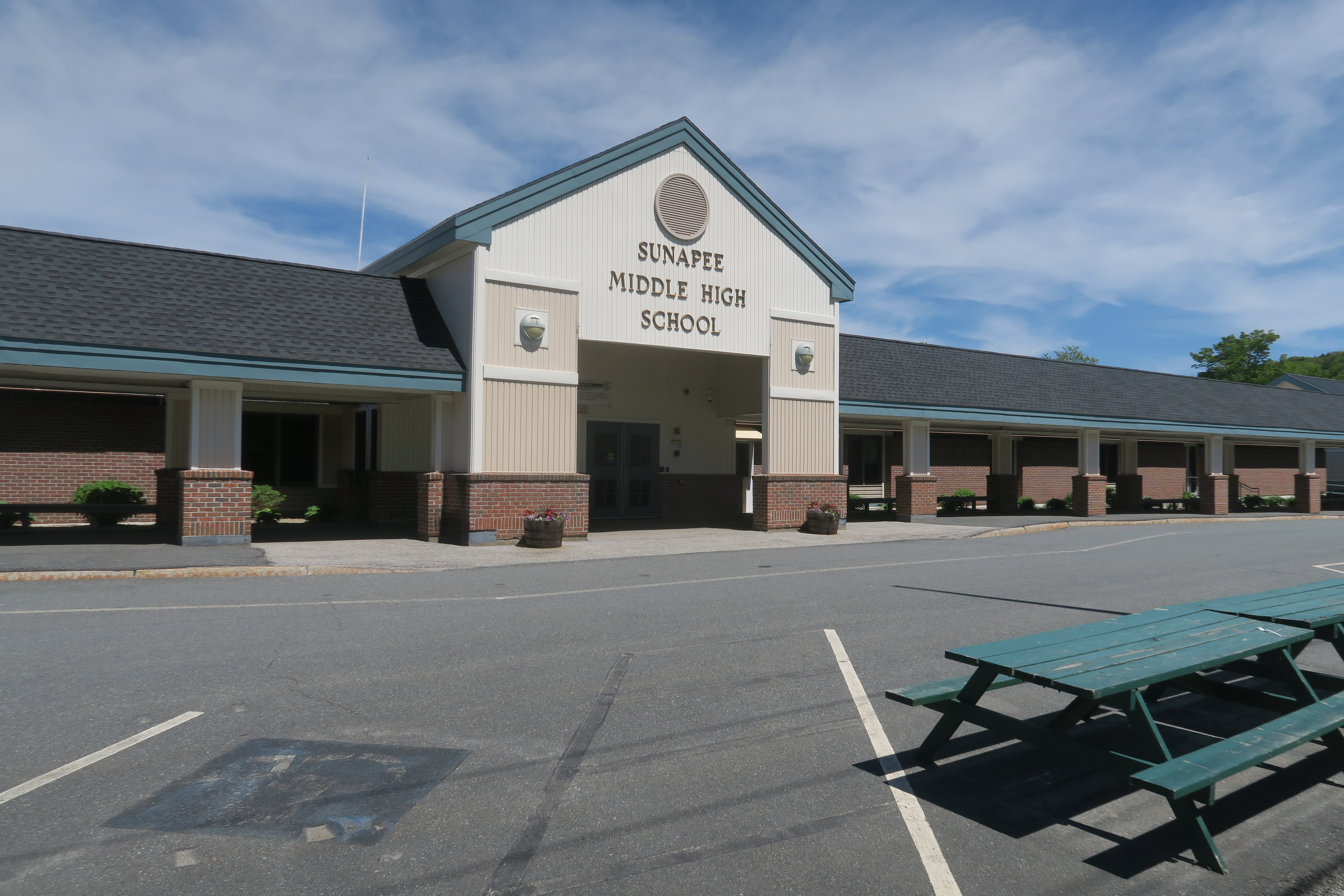

Location
- 10 North Road; Sunapee, (Sullivan County), New Hampshire 03782; United States

Information
- Type: Public high school
- Principal: Sean Moynihan
- Staff: 14.30 (FTE)
- Enrollment: 130 (2022-23)
- Student to teacher ratio: 9.09
- Colors: Dark green and white
- Nickname: Lakers

Sunapee Middle–High School is a high school and middle school located in Sunapee, New Hampshire, United States. Established in 1974, the school had approximately 136 students in grades 9–12 and 109 students in grades 6–8 during the 2009–10 school year. There are approximately 37 staff and faculty members. They have Varsity and Junior Varsity baseball, softball, basketball, volleyball, cheerleading, as well as track, golf and soccer teams, called the Sunapee Lakers. Winter sports include Alpine and Cross-country skiing, as well as ski jumping. SMHS has an unfunded, but comprehensive drama program, producing plays such Footloose, Godspell and Alice in Wonderland. Some of the clubs and groups within the school are the Art Club, French Club, Harvard Model Congress, National Honors Society, Mock trial, Chess Club, Writers' group, Athletic Leadership council, and various student government groups. There is a Middle and High School band and chorus, which performs in the winter and spring of each year, as well as at the senior graduation.
