= Timberlane Regional High School =

Public school in New Hampshire, United States

Coordinates: 42°50′35″N 71°06′57″W

Location
- 36 Greenough Rd; Plaistow, New Hampshire 03865

Information
- Type: Public
- Motto: Opes Hominum est Sapientia Quam Relinquent - The strength of man is the wisdom which he leaves behind.
- Established: 1966
- School district: Timberlane Regional School District
- Principal: John Vacarezzza
- Grades: 9-12
- Enrollment: 972 (2023-2024)
- Campus: Suburban
- Colors: Maroon & white
- Athletics: Lacrosse, Wrestling, Football, Baseball, Basketball, Softball, Track & Field, Cheerleading, Volleyball, Tennis, Soccer, Field Hockey, Ice Hockey, Swimming, Golf, Ski Team and Cross Country
- Mascot: Owls
- Website: www.timberlane.net/hs/

Timberlane Regional High School is located in Plaistow, New Hampshire, and serves as a regional high school for the towns of Atkinson, Danville, Plaistow, and Sandown, New Hampshire. The school was built in 1966 and is a part of the Timberlane Regional School District. Timberlane Regional High School is a co-educational school for grades 9-12. The school has won the 1996, 1997 and 2014 Excellence In Education Award. As of 2005, the school has approximately 1,400 students on roll. The school mascot is the owl. The school is regionally accredited for its award-winning wrestling team, which holds 28 NH State Wrestling Champions titles, as of 2020.

== History ==
Timberlane was built in the vicinity of Plaistow's town dump in 1966 as a regional high school for the four towns it still serves today. The name 'Timberlane' came from the forestry industry that played a major role in the economic development of New Hampshire. Before the school was built, students attended several different high schools in the area, including Haverhill High School in nearby Haverhill, Massachusetts.

During the 1970s the school experienced a strike of nearly all its faculty, and overcrowding which necessitated double sessions (one half of the students would take classes in the morning, with the other half taking classes in the afternoon). This overcrowding was rectified in 1975 by the opening of the Timberlane Regional Middle School as a neighbor to the school.

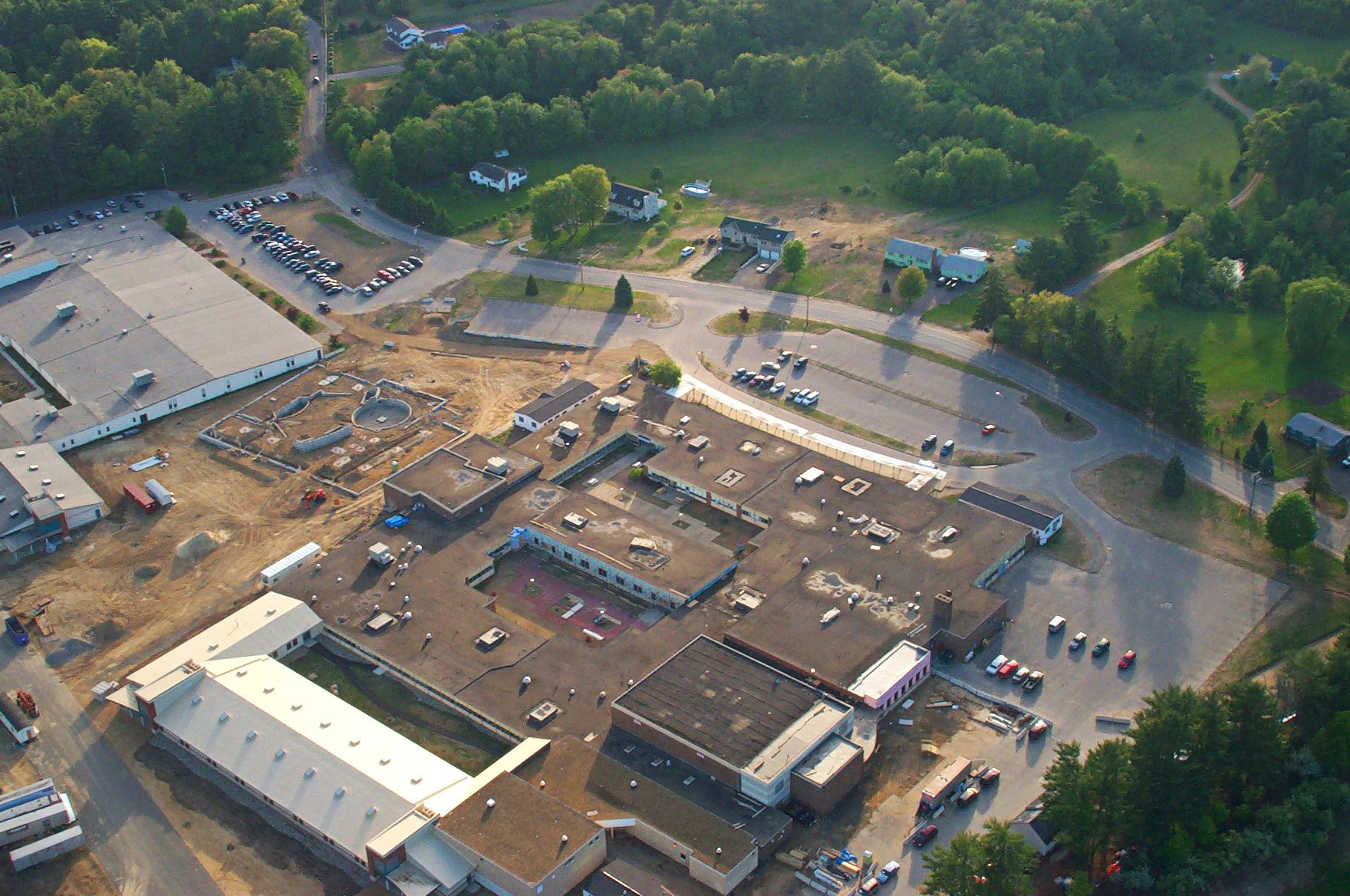
Timberlane High School (right) and Middle School in May 2001. The Performing Arts Center was under construction in the center. The 2001 addition to the high school can be seen at the rear of the school.

By the early 1980s, the school needed expansion. An addition was completed in 1987, which included a second gymnasium and increased space for the athletic program. The student numbers continued to increase as families moved from Boston, Massachusetts, further out to the suburbs, and by the mid-1990s the school again became overcrowded. In the fall of 1998 several modular classrooms were installed on the property as a temporary solution, and the community demanded an extensive remodelling of the building and the six other schools in the Timberlane Regional School District.

In 1999, a $40 million renovation program was carried out district-wide, which included a complete remodeling and expansion of the high school as well as the construction of the $7 million Timberlane Regional Performing Arts Center. Several new classrooms were added, the sizes of the cafeteria and gymnasium were increased, and a ventilation system was installed. During the summer of 2007, a new roof was brought to the school after many years of leaks.

== Academics ==
In addition to its traditional academic offerings, Timberlane allows students to take vocational classes at Salem High School and Pinkerton Academy.

=== Advanced Placement offerings ===
Timberlane offers the following AP courses:

- AP Calculus (AB)
- AP Statistics
- AP Biology
- AP Physics B
- AP Chemistry
- AP U.S. History
- AP World History
- AP English Literature and Composition
- AP United States Government and Politics
- AP Computer Science
- AP European History
- AP Human Geography
- AP Environmental Science
- AP Art
- AP English Language and Composition
- Practicing Teaching course offered through Southern New Hampshire University

== Notable alumni ==
- Kirk Carlsen (2005), professional cyclist
- Lily Hevesh (2016), domino artist and YouTuber
- Gabriella Westwood (2009) Actress and Writer

== Controversies ==
In 2009, student Joshua Tubbs wrote an essay entitled “Sen10rs”, where he rated and reviewed each student of the senior class. This caused a public uproar and was reported and followed by many media outlets.

In 2018, teacher Daniel Joyce was arrested on charges of assaulting a student.

On December 15, 2021, high school math teacher David Russell turned himself into authorities after a warrant was issued for his arrest for simple and sexual assault of a juvenile high school student. Russell was previously placed on administrative leave in November 2021 pending the outcome of the districts investigation.

In June 2023, a non-student juvenile entered the building intoxicated after having taken the school bus from a different home. He stayed in the bathroom challenging people to fight, until someone agreed to. After being confronted by staff, the individual fled the school causing a shelter-in-place at the high school and next door middle school. He was later taken into custody by police; no injuries or damage occurred.

== See also ==
- Atkinson Academy
- Plaistow, New Hampshire
- Timberlane Regional Middle School
