= Pembroke Academy =

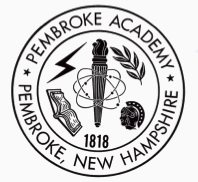

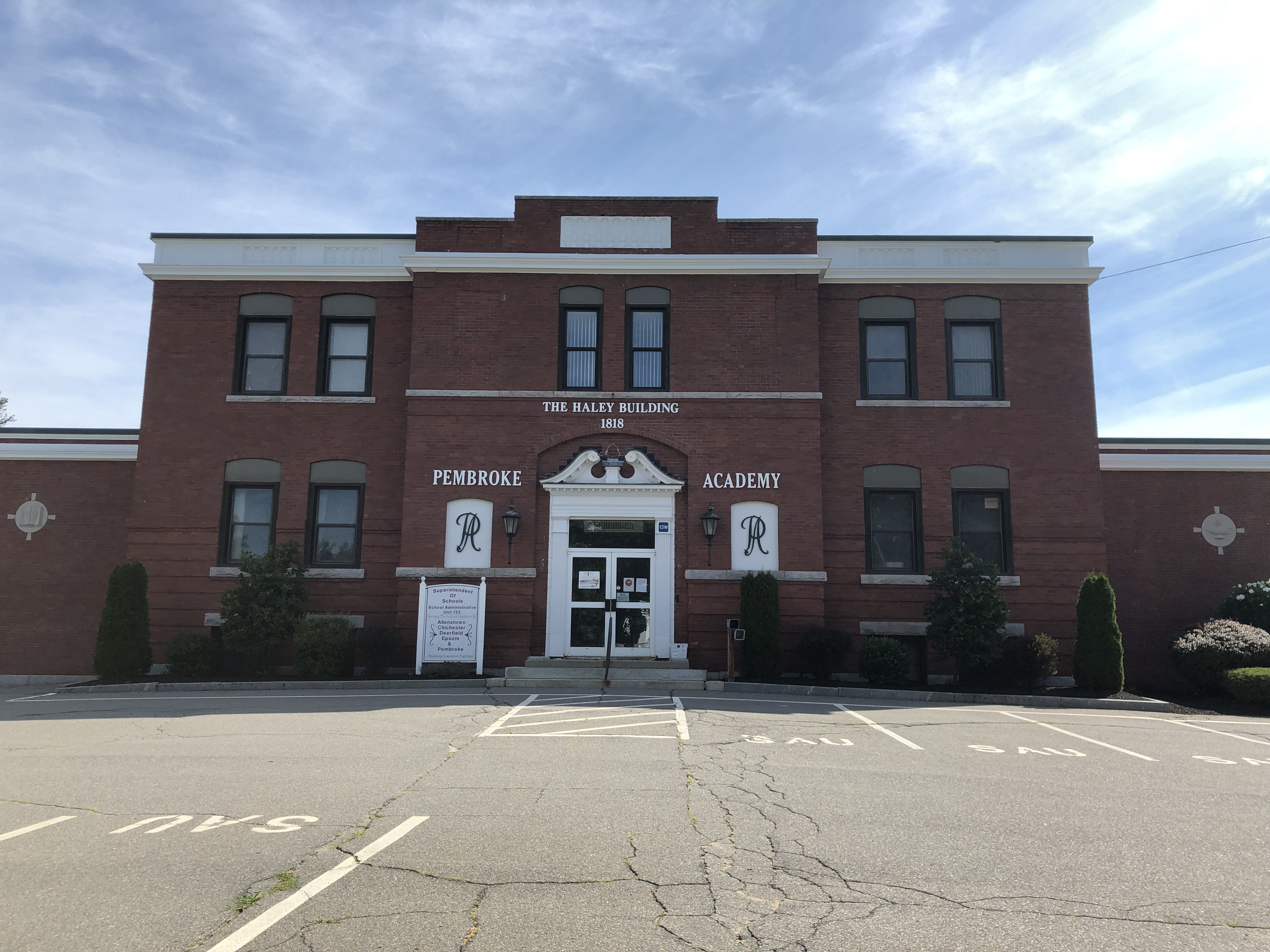
- Pembroke Academy in 2020

Location
- Pembroke, NH; USA; 43°08′46″N 71°27′21″W

Information
- Type: Public
- Established: 1818; 208 years ago
- Headmaster: Derek Hamilton
- Faculty: 90
- Enrollment: 850
- Average class size: 20 students
- Student to teacher ratio: 14:1
- Campus type: Suburban/rural
- Colors: Dark green and white
- Nickname: Spartans
- Rival: Merrimack Valley High School, Coe-Brown Northwood Academy, Bow High School
- Website: pa.sau53.org/en-US

Pembroke Academy is a public secondary school in Pembroke, New Hampshire.

== History ==
Original Pembroke Academy building that burned down in 1900

Pembroke Academy was incorporated on June 25, 1818, as a private school, and on May 25, 1819, the first building was dedicated. The academy opened with 48 students on May 26, 1819, and the first headmaster was Reverend Amos Burnham. In its early years Pembroke Academy prepared many students for attendance at Dartmouth College.

== School profile ==
Today the school is public and part of the School Administration Unit 53 (SAU53). Pembroke Academy primarily receives students from Pembroke and from the neighboring towns of Allenstown, Epsom, Chichester, but also receives some students from other adjacent towns such Deerfield and Hooksett. Students from several other towns are also accepted on a memorandum of understanding. With approximately 850 students, the school competes in Division II in athletics by the NHIAA for most sports. The school's mascot is the Spartan.

== Notable alumni ==
- Charles H. Bell, 38th Governor of New Hampshire
- William E. Chandler, U.S. senator, Secretary of the Navy
- Charles Carleton Coffin, journalist, author
- David M. Cote, CEO, Honeywell International
- Byron M. Cutcheon, Civil War general, U.S. congressman
- Mary Baker Eddy, founder of Christian Science denomination
- Riley F. Kennedy, Politician
- Oscar Lapham, U.S. congressman
- Henry F. C. Nichols, Wisconsin assemblyman
- John B. Sanborn, Civil War general
