= Keene High School =

Coordinates: 42°56′24″N 72°18′50″W

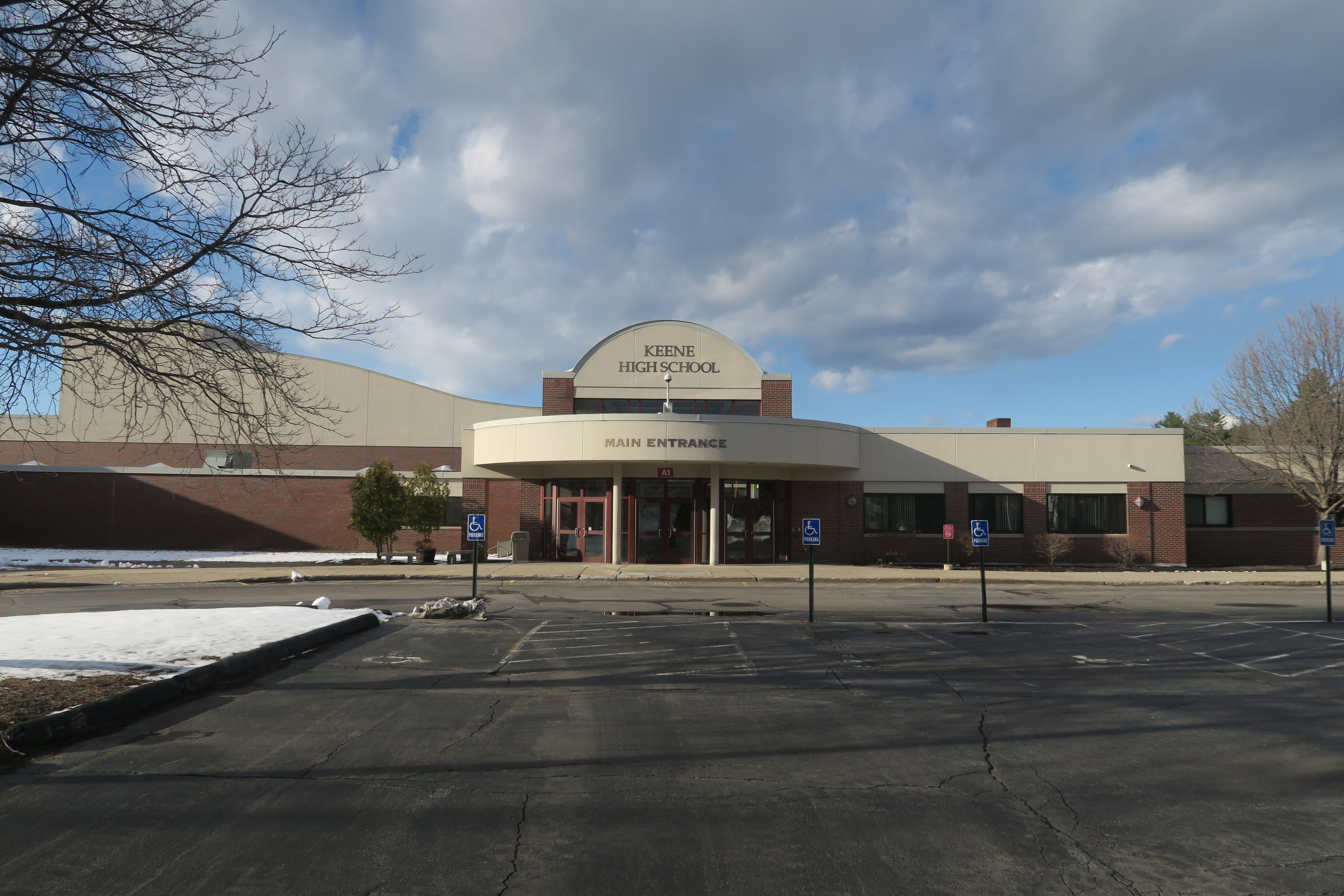
- 43 Arch Street; Keene, NH 03431

Information
- Type: Public high school
- Motto: "Veritas Per Scientiam" (Latin translation "Truth Through Knowledge")
- Established: 1828; 198 years ago
- Principal: Cindy Gallagher
- Teaching staff: 105.00 (on FTE basis)
- Enrollment: 1,328 (2023-2024)
- Student to teacher ratio: 12.65
- Campus: Suburban
- Colors: Black & Orange
- Nickname: Blackbirds
- Information: 603-352-0640
- Website: khs.keeneschoolsnh.org

Keene High School (KHS) is a public high school located in Keene, New Hampshire. It serves the city of Keene and the surrounding towns of Chesterfield, Harrisville, Marlborough, Marlow, Nelson, Stoddard, Sullivan, Surry, Westmoreland and Winchester.

The Cheshire Career Center, a co-curricular and community education center, is located in the South Annex of the building.

As of the 2014–15 school year, the school had an enrollment of approximately 1,391 students and 121.8 classroom teachers (on a FTE basis), for a student-teacher ratio of 11.0.

== Awards and recognition ==
Teacher Kelly Budd was recognized in 1999 as a winner of the Milken Family Foundation National Educator Awards for work that included a ninth-grade unit on The Holocaust that culminated in a trip to the United States Holocaust Memorial Museum in Washington, D.C. for the entire freshman class.

Keene High School was winner of the 2002 International Envirothon title, a high school environmental competition, defeating 47 teams from high schools across the United States and Canada. The Keene team won the New Hampshire Envirothon competition in 2006, 2007, 2008, and 2009, placing 12th overall in the North American competition in 2006 and placing 9th in 2009. In the 2010 state competition two KHS teams competed, one winning and the other placing third. The winning team tied for ninth nationally.

The Drama Club has won multiple Theatre at the Mount Youth (TAMY) awards for its musicals.

In 2013, the Cheshire Career Center Television Production Program won national gold medals for TV (Video) Production through SkillsUSA. In 2014, students won national gold medals in Digital Filmmaking through SkillsUSA. In 2015 and 2016, student were top 10 at the SkillsUSA NSLC in Broadcast News.

== Courses ==
On average, 200 courses are taught each school year, pending involvement from staff and students.

== Administration ==
The school is within the New Hampshire School Administrative Unit No. 29, covering Keene and six other communities in Cheshire County.

Within the school, there is a Main Office, Guidance Office, Health Office, Department Offices and "House Offices". The Houses are arranged in groups of students, alphabetically. There are three house offices: Blue, Gold and Green.

== Departments ==
There are 11 curricular departments:

- Social Studies
- Mathematics
- Science
- English

- Foreign Language
- Fine Arts
- Life Education
- Special Education

- Physical Education
- Technology Education
- Business Education

== Music ==
KHS has the largest music department of any other surrounding high schools. It has two choirs: KHS Choir and KHS Voices. It has the KHS Concert Band and the KHS Jazz Ensemble which is a big band. The Jazz Ensemble is the focus of many local jazz concerts and has won several performance awards. The music department also has a string orchestra and a collaborative music ensemble known as Encore.

In addition to the performing classes, there are courses in Music History, Music Theory, Beginning Piano, Intermediate Piano, and Beginning Guitar.

Each spring, the Keene High Music Department hosts the variety show "Nostalgia". Keene High participates in the New Hampshire All-State Music Festival, New England Music Festival, and Monadnock Valley Music Festival.

== Athletics ==
2006 was a successful year for the Keene High School sports teams, with the Boys Swimming and Diving winning the state championship over Oyster River High School 235–135, and the girls winning the Division I cross-country skiing championship over Concord High School. The boys ski team was runner-up to state champion Concord High School in both the Division I Alpine and Division I Cross Country.

The boys baseball team won back-to-back Class L state championships in 1996 and 1997, winning their second in a row with a 12–5 win over Merrimack High School in the championship game. They won the Class L state championship again in 2009, defeating Alvirne 9–4.

Keene High School's Dave Minickiello retired in 1999 after 31 years as the school's wrestling coach, having led the team to nine state titles and a New England crown, having coached seven New England individual champion wrestlers and winning more than 60 New Hampshire state championships.

== Activities ==
43 student clubs and activities are listed on the school's website. The oldest club is the Ushers club; the Drama club is one of the largest, with an enrollment of over 110 students.

The Drama Club puts on two shows a year: one musicals in the fall, and one straight play held in the spring. The current production staff is Elizabeth Hansel (director), Danielle Heeran (director/music director), and Kristen Leach (choreographer).

The Keene High School quiz bowl team has competed on Granite State Challenge, progressing to the semi-finals in the twenty-ninth season. The team placed first in the state in both the Fall 2012 and Spring 2013 competitions of Knowledge Master Open.

The FIRST Robotics Team finished in first place at the 2015 event in Durham, New Hampshire.

== Scheduling ==
Keene High School is based on a block scheduling system. There are four blocks in a school day and one period of I-Time. Classes switch during the second semester. There is a 5-minute transition between classes. The school day runs from 7:25 AM to 2:18 PM. In the 2020-2021 School Year however, this was changed to run from 8:40 AM to 3:33 PM.

== Languages ==
Keene High offers courses in two foreign languages:

- French
  - French, I, II, III, IV, IV Honors, V, and AP French
- Spanish
  - Spanish for Beginners, Spanish I, II, III, IV, IV Honors, V, and AP Spanish

Students in the French program, in conjunction with the neighboring Monadnock Regional High School, have the opportunity to go on exchange with Lycée Lumière in Luxeuil-les-Bains, in the Franche-Comté region of France. Students in the Spanish program can to go on exchange with Colegio Agave in Almería, in the province of Almería, Spain.

== Visiting speakers ==
In 2015, president Donald J. Trump spoke in the gym while running for his 2016 campaign.

In 2016, KHS alumnus and author Ernest Hebert spoke to students in the Cheshire Career Center's Television Production Program and KHS A.P. U.S. History students as part of a project for the Cheshire Historical Society.

In the fall of 2010, Keene High students participated in a "One Book One Read" program to help in the prevention of bullying. For this, Jodi Picoult came to speak to the students about the topic she wrote about in her book Nineteen Minutes.

In the spring of 2007, Holocaust survivor and author David Faber gave a presentation to the entire student body regarding his experiences in Nazi Germany.

Presidential candidate Hillary Clinton spoke at the school on February 11, 2007.

Wesley Clark spoke at the school in the run-up to the 2004 New Hampshire primary.

During the 1992 presidential primaries, future president Bill Clinton spoke at the school and entertained questions from selected students.

During the 1976 primaries President of the United States Gerald Ford spoke at Keene High School, in his efforts to stave off an incipient challenge from Ronald Reagan.

United States Senator George McGovern spoke at the school during the run-up to the 1972 Democratic New Hampshire primary, in his ultimately successful bid to win the party's nomination for president.

== Post education ==
On average, 39.7% of Keene High School students attend 4 year colleges, 6% entered a less than four year education, 52.2% entered employment, and 3.2% entered the armed forces. The total post-secondary attendance is therefore 45.7%.

== Notable alumni ==
- John Bosa (1964-), former defensive lineman for the Miami Dolphins
- Jonathan Daniels, Episcopal seminarian killed during the civil rights movement
- Ernest Hebert, author of the Darby series
- Robert L. Mallat Jr., member of the New Hampshire House of Representatives
- Heather Wilson (1960-), Republican member of the United States House of Representatives, representing New Mexico's 1st congressional district. She is the first woman veteran ever elected to the United States Congress.
