= Campbell High School (New Hampshire) =

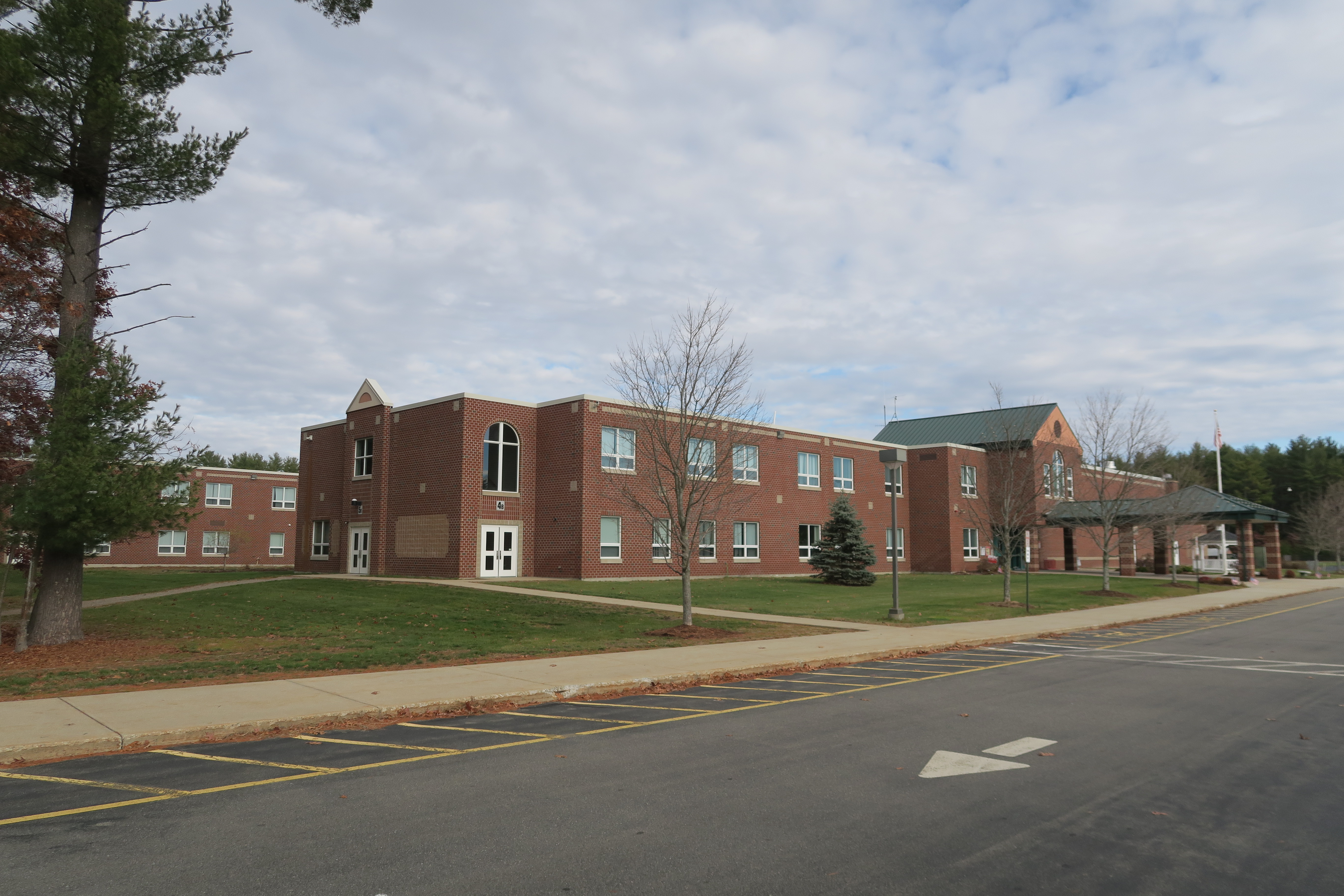

Location
- 1 Highlander Court; Litchfield, New Hampshire; United States; 42°49′31″N 71°26′45″W

Information
- Type: Secondary
- Motto: Character, Courage, Respect and Responsibility
- Established: 1999
- School district: Litchfield School District, NH SAU 27
- Principal: Jacob Hess
- Teaching staff: 31.00 (FTE)
- Grades: 9-12
- Gender: M/F
- Enrollment: 382 (2023–2024)
- Student to teacher ratio: 12.32
- Campus: Suburban
- Colors: Red and black
- Mascot: Cougar
- Nickname: Cougars
- Website: www.litchfieldsd.org/campbellhighschool_home.aspx

Campbell High School is located in Litchfield, New Hampshire, United States. It is the only high school in the town, with a student population of approximately 550. Newsweek ranked Campbell High School at number 142 out of approximately 15,000 high schools in the United States in its "America's Top Schools 2014" article published in September of that year.

== Final exams ==
When Campbell High School first opened, there were no finals. When students learned that Alvirne High School in neighboring Hudson gets a half day for finals, the students brought up the idea to the teachers, and later the school board. Students now have finals on the last four days of a semester. In the past Monday on finals week is A and B, the Tuesday C and D, the Wednesday E and F, while Friday is G and H; But this year, it will have all 8 classes on Monday (Order: A, E, B, F, C, G, D, H), then A and b on Tuesday, C and D on Wednesday, E and F on Thursday, G on Friday and H on the following Monday. If a student has a study period, they do not have to show up for the block on that day of a final.

== Grading with core competencies ==
Courses at CHS have between two and five competencies per semester. Core competencies for multiple section classes are the same, even when there are different teachers. Students have multiple opportunities for assessment of core competencies. They may include tests, quizzes, research papers, oral presentations, essays, and labs. Campbell was the first school in New Hampshire to introduce core competencies.

A student must earn a grade of at least 65% in each competency in order to pass the course. If a student fails one or more of the core competencies in a course, he or she fails the course. Some courses are offered in summer school. In order to be eligible for summer school, a student must pass at least half the core competencies. Eligible students attending summer school are only required to master the core competencies they failed.

== Campbell Advisory Program ==
All students at Campbell High School participate in the Campbell Advisory Program. Students meet with their staff advisors for thirty five minutes in groups of approximately twelve. The CAG advisor is a spokesperson and an advocate for the best interests of each advisee. Each advocate is a contact person and a resource for his or her advisees. It is hoped that a lasting relationship can be developed in this context so each student feels he or she has a spokesperson who is approachable and works on his or her behalf. CAG also encourages trust, responsibility and mutual respect among a diverse group of students.

Students of Campbell High School also have a policy where there is a formative and summative grading system. Formative is the class work or homework that is worth 15% of the class grade. Summative work are quizzes, test or other forms of work that is worth 85% of the class grade.

== Sophomore project ==
All students must successfully complete and present a project during their sophomore year in order to graduate from Campbell High School. The Sophomore Project reflects a minimum of thirty hours of community service chosen by the student and approved by the sophomore project clearinghouse.

== Senior project ==
The Senior Project is a requirement for graduation at Campbell High School for all seniors, as well as any students considering early graduation. The Senior Project is designed by each student and approved by the senior project clearinghouse, and must reflect at least forty hours of work. Completion includes a class presentation. These projects develop individual skills and knowledge in an area that the student chooses. Opportunities to gain credit for the project will be based on documented hours: 67.5 plus hours can earn one-half credit and 135 plus hours can earn one credit.

== Sports ==
Campbell High School is a member of the New Hampshire Interscholastic Athletic Association (NHIAA). Campbell competes in 7 fall sports, 5 winter sports, and 4 spring sports, all members of the Division III NHIAA.

=== Football ===
The football team at Campbell High does well, earning the title of undefeated state champs in the 2017-18 season, the first Campbell football team to earn that title in school history. This is the most recent state championship win since the 2014-15 season.

=== Softball ===
The CHS Softball team competes both at the varsity and junior varsity level. The varsity softball team has made five championship appearances (going 4-5), the first being in 2008, and the latest in 2015. The Lady Cougars won the 2011 NHIAA Division III championship, with an 8-0 win over Somersworth High School. Following the 2011 title, the Cougars won three consecutive NHIAA Division III championships in 2013, 2014, and 2015.

=== Baseball ===
Campbell High School has a varsity and junior varsity baseball team. The varsity baseball team has done exceptionally well, making seven championship appearances since 2006. The team has won five NHIAA Division III championships, the first being in 2006, followed by ones in 2011, 2014, 2015, and 2017.
