= Fall Mountain Regional High School =

Location
- 134 FMRHS Road; Langdon, Sullivan County, New Hampshire 03602; United States; 43°09′31″N 72°24′17″W

Information
- Established: 1966
- School district: SAU60
- NCES District ID: 3302990
- Principal: Sarah Edmunds
- Teaching staff: 39.00 (on an FTE basis)
- Grades: 9-12
- Enrollment: 486 (2023-2024)
- Student to teacher ratio: 12.46
- Colors: Maroon and white
- Nickname: Wildcats
- Website: fmrhs.sau60.org

Fall Mountain Regional High School is a small high school located in Langdon, New Hampshire, in the United States. The school, part of School Administrative Unit 60 in New Hampshire, serves the towns of Langdon, Acworth, Alstead, Charlestown, and Walpole.

== Formation and opening ==
The Fall Mountain Regional School Board was created in 1964 with the goal of opening a cooperative high school from the local towns. In September 1964, the Board engaged the architectural firm of Haines, Leineck & Smith from Lowell, Massachusetts to design preliminary plans for the new high school. An award to R.E. Bean Company of Keene, New Hampshire to build the new school for $1,075,887 was announced in August 1965.

The school opened in September 1966. The student body was created by combining the students of Walpole High School, North Walpole, Charlestown, and Alstead (the former Vilas High School). This creation of a consolidated high school was part of the nationwide trend of school consolidation in the United States at this time. For example, the last graduating class of Vilas High School in 1966, one of the schools which merged into Fall Mountain Regional, was only 20 students.

== French Program ==
From 2023-2026, the Fall Mountain French Program was awarded Exemplary with Distinction by the American Association of Teachers of French, equivalent to rank 1 in the country.

== JROTC ==
The JROTC at the school which was founded in 1996 has competed at a national level, participating in the JLAB National Competitions in Washington D.C. in 2021, 2024, and 2025. Dutch photographer Ellen Kok spent two years documenting the school's group activities after seeing them at a parade in 2010. She published a book called "Cadets" from her work.

== 2020 Referendum ==
In 2020, Charlestown, which makes up 41 percent of the high school student body, considered withdrawing from the school. The fact that Charlestown pays a higher school tax rate fueled the issue. While a study committee had recommended withdrawal, the proposal would have increased costs in Charlestown and the other towns. A voter referendum on the proposal was strongly rejected, including in Charlestown itself.
