= Bow High School =

Coordinates: 43°09′14″N 71°32′54″W

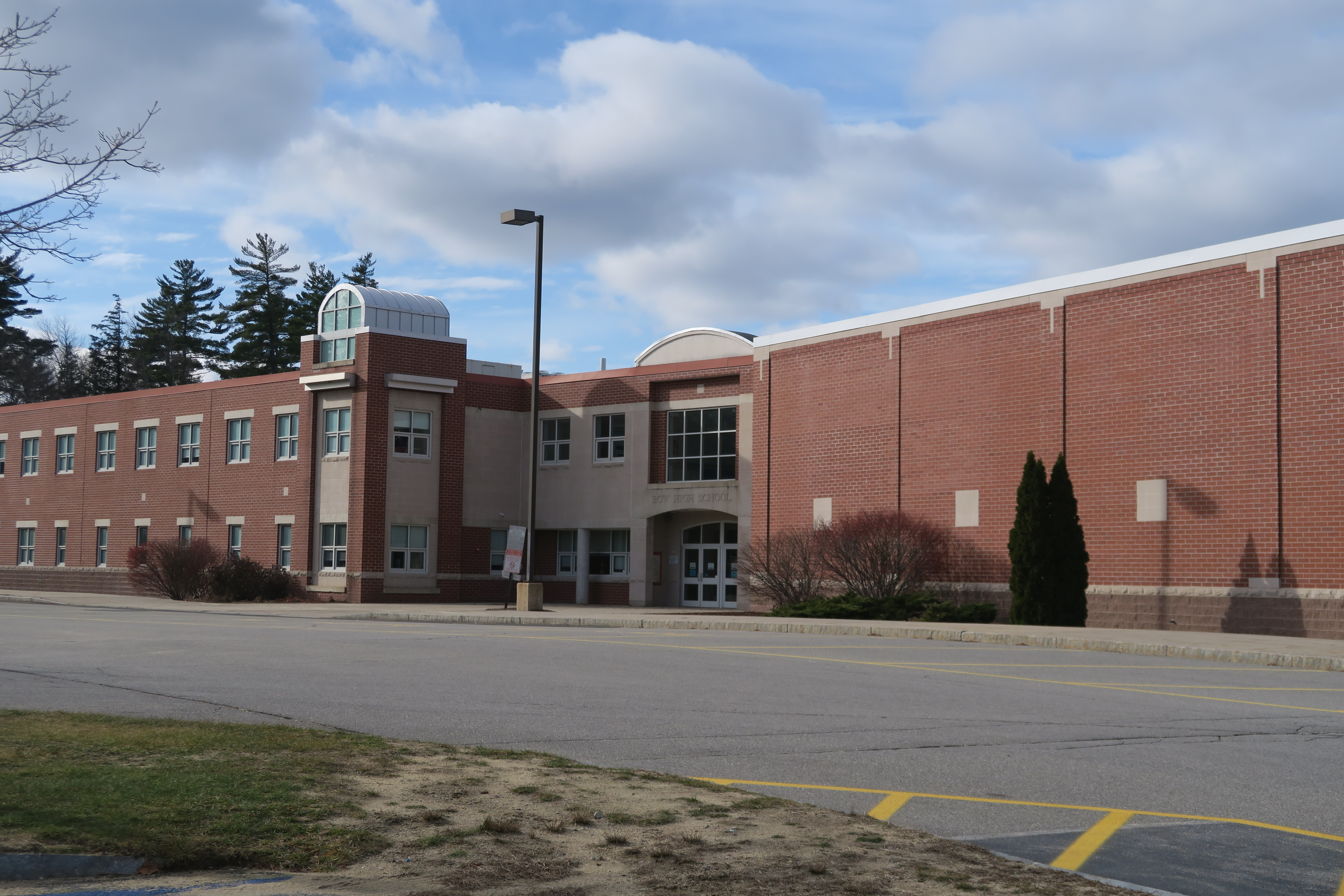
- 55 Falcon Way; Bow, New Hampshire 03304

Information
- Type: Public high school
- Established: 1997
- School district: Bow School District
- CEEB code: 300059
- Principal: Matt Fisk
- Faculty: 48.00 (on FTE basis)
- Grades: 9 - 12
- Enrollment: 611 (2023-2024)
- Student to teacher ratio: 12.73
- Campus: Suburban
- Colors: Navy blue, gold, and white
- Athletics: New Hampshire Interscholastic Athletic Association (NHIAA)
- Mascot: Falcon
- Newspaper: The Falcon Vision
- Website: bhs.sau67nh.gov

Bow High School is a four-year public high school in Bow, New Hampshire, United States, and is part of the Bow School District (SAU 67). The principal is Matt Fisk. As of the 2022-2023 school year, the school had an approximate enrollment of 604 students and 35 classroom teachers (on an FTE basis), for a student-teacher ratio of 17.26.

== History ==
Bow High School was established in 1997, serving grades 9 through 12. Before this time high school students from Bow went to Concord. In 1993 the Concord School District told Bow they could no longer send Bow students to Concord High after the 1996-1997 school year. Immediately Bow started to make plans for a high school of their own. The school was built and now sits on the shores of Turee Pond. The school was originally designed to accommodate 600 students, and in the 2021-2022 school year had a student population of 621. However the building is never at student capacity thanks to the school's scheduling system. The school cost $16 million to build. Beginning in the fall of 2014, the school began serving students from the neighboring town of Dunbarton.

Some features of the school and campus include: a 595-seat auditorium, 800-seat gym, rock climbing wall, zipline course, and state of the art technology.

== Academics ==
=== Classes ===
Each student at BHS is required to take two science classes, which is fulfilled through a mandatory Integrated Science and Technology class freshman and sophomore year, although the majority of students take more than that. Students are required to graduate with two and a half Building Essential Skills for Tomorrow (B.E.S.T) classes (physical education). Students are also required to take a freshman American Dream class, a sophomore World Studies class, a junior Civics and Government class, and seniors are required to take Senior Seminar, a class that directs them through their senior project. The school offers many different elective classes, such as art, music, STEM, and physical education.

Bow High School revamped its schedule adding in a 45 minute study period called "flex time." The start time of the school day has been pushed back on certain days of the week as well.

=== Graduation credit requirements ===
Bow High School requires students to acquire 24 academic credits to graduate.

Graduation Requirements as of the 2025-2026 School Year
8 Humanities Credits	8 Math, Science, Technology, & Business Credits	2.5 BEST Credits	5.5 Elective Credits
2 Credits in American Dream (English, US/NH Government)	1 credit Integrated Physical Science Includes Physical, Biological, Earth & Space Science topics	1 credit in BEST 9: which includes Physical & Health Education topics	Electives include any course successfully completed and not yet used to fulfill a requirement listed within this table. All FACS and World Language courses fall into this category.
2 Credits in America in the World (English, US/World History, Geography)	1 credit Integrated Life Science: which includes Physical and Biological Science topics	1 credit in BEST 10: which includes Physical & Health Education topics	
2 Credits in English (includes .5 Senior Seminar and .5 Writing Course)	4 years of Math experiences which must include 3 years of math, including Algebra I	.5 credit of any BEST elective to be completed in the junior or senior year	
.5 Credits in Civics - Students must pass the United States Citizenship & Naturalization Exam	.5 Money Matters or Personal Finance and Investing I (Personal Finance and Investing I is recommended for students who plan to pursue a degree in business)		
.5 Credits In Art Electives	1.5-2 credits of any STEM electives		
.5 credit Humanities based elections (Art, Music, English or Social Studies)			

Non-Credit Requirements for All Students:

- Minimum of 20 community service hours.
- Minimum of 20 Career Exploration hours.
- Senior Project (as part of the Senior Seminar course)
- Digital Portfolio
- Per NH HB 1367, passing grade on the United States Citizenship & Naturalization Exam

== Athletics ==
Mike Desilets is Bow School District's Athletic Administrator. As of 2024, Bow has won 88 state championships.

The athletic teams participate primarily in NHIAA Division 2 with some teams participating in Division 1 and 3.

Athletic Programs
Fall	Winter	Spring
Football	Alpine Skiing	Baseball
Bass Fishing	Basketball	Girls Lacrosse***
Cross Country	Boys Ice Hockey*	Boys Lacrosse***
Field Hockey	Girls Ice Hockey*	
Golf	Indoor Track	Softball
Soccer	Nordic Skiing	Tennis
Fall Spirit	Winter Spirit	Track and Field
Unified Soccer	Swimming	
	Unified Basketball	
	Wrestling***	
	Gymnastics	
	ESports*	
*=Division 1, ***=Division 3

== Extracurricular activities ==
Bow High School offers an extensive and diverse list of student and staff ran clubs in addition to their Athletic Programs. Clubs range from service based clubs such as Interact, Peer Outreach, and NHS, to Language, Arts, STEM, and Special Interests Clubs.

Student Teal Van Dyck won second place in the national Poetry Out Loud in 2006, earning a $10,000 scholarship. Van Dyck was also selected to be one of Bow High School's Granite State Challenge competitors on New Hampshire's PBS station, NHPTV.

== Notable Events ==
The school auditorium was the scene for a town hall campaign event by then-Democratic presidential candidate Pete Buttigieg on October 24, 2019.

The school was the scene of a set piece speech by Bill Clinton on January 8, 2008 in support of Hillary Clinton's 2008 presidential campaign.

== Controversies ==
In June 2005 the student population, with the exception of the senior class, took place in a school mandated DHHS survey. 17% of surveyed students reported smoking marijuana during a 30-day period and 31% reported consuming alcohol during the same period. The results were below the state average for student substance abuse and the school principal did not consider the results sufficient to necessitate drug testing of student athletes.
