= Pinkerton Academy =

Secondary school in New Hampshire, US

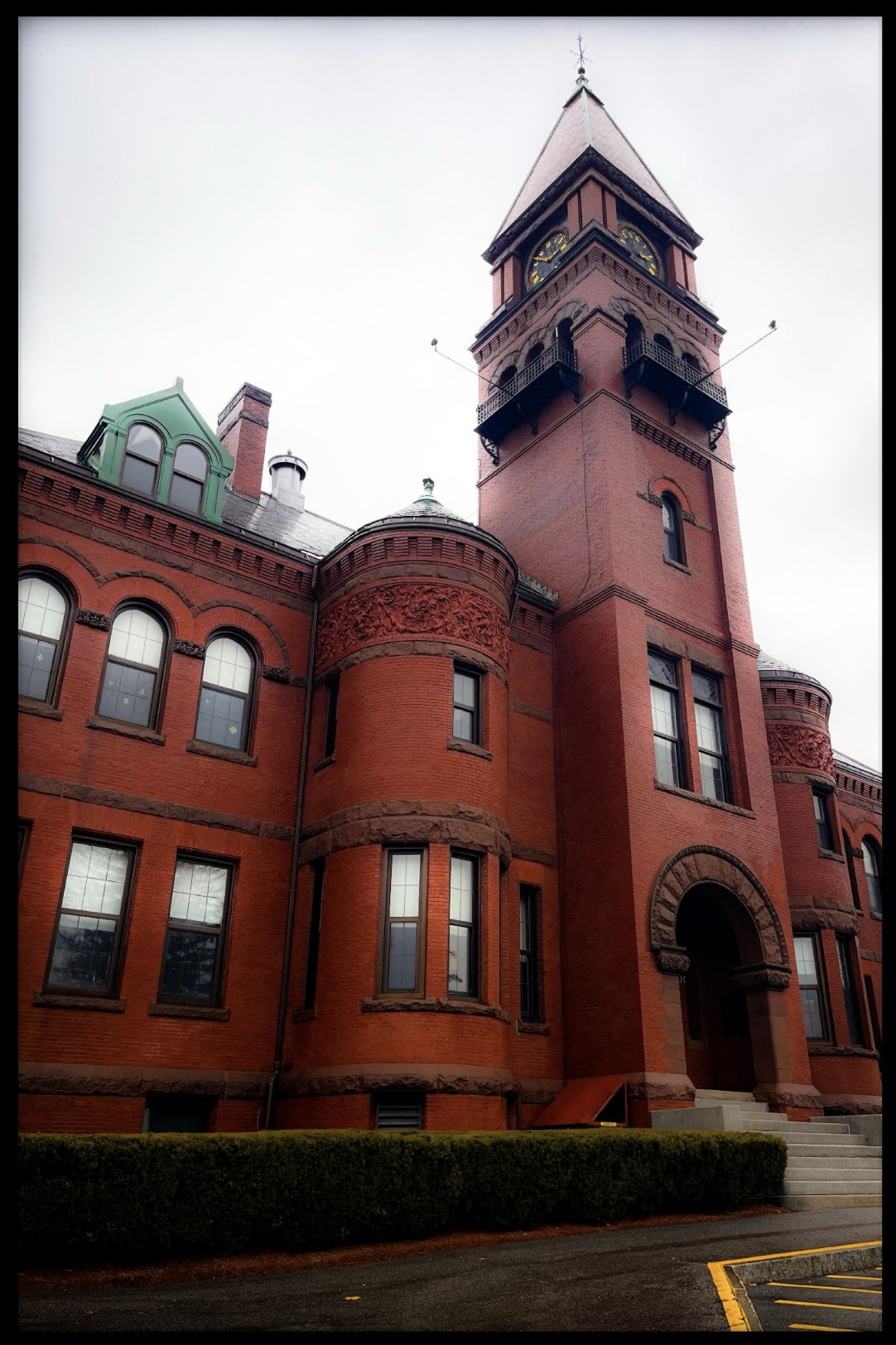
- Academy building

Location
- 5 Pinkerton St. Derry, New Hampshire 03038; United States; 42°53′42″N 71°19′01″W

Information
- School type: Non-profit High School (classified as public by the State of New Hampshire and NCES)
- Motto: "Quality Education Since 1814"
- Founded: 1814; 212 years ago
- CEEB code: 300130
- Headmaster: Timothy Powers
- Athletic Director: Brian O'Reilly
- Faculty: 280
- Grades: 9–12
- Enrollment: 3,237 (2018-19)
- Language: English
- Colors: Red and white
- Athletics conference: NHIAA; Division I
- Mascot: Astroman
- Rivals: Londonderry High School
- Accreditation: NEASC
- Newspaper: The Launchpad
- Communities served: Auburn, Candia, Chester, Derry, Hampstead, and Hooksett
- Website: www.pinkertonacademy.org
- Last updated: Oct 12, 2019

Pinkerton Academy is a secondary school in Derry, New Hampshire, United States. It serves roughly 3,269 students, making it by far the largest high school in New Hampshire, more than 1,300 students greater than the next largest high school. Pinkerton's situation is unusual, as it is a privately-incorporated school that serves as the public high school (grades 9–12) for the communities of Derry, Hampstead, Chester, Auburn, Candia, and Hooksett. Through arrangements with the towns, each town pays the tuition for its students to attend Pinkerton. Pinkerton Academy is a private, non-profit corporation administered by a headmaster who acts under the direction of an elected board of trustees.

Pinkerton Academy is set on a 120-acre (49 ha) New England campus. Since the original four-room Old Academy Building opened in 1815, over one dozen major buildings have been constructed, for academics and administration.

The New Hampshire Department of Education classifies Pinkerton Academy as a school district. The National Center for Education Statistics (NCES) classifies it as a public school, and such is in its own school district.

== History ==
In 1793, a classical high school was established in the eastern part of Londonderry (split off in 1827 as the town of Derry) and was maintained for twenty years by direct tax, tuition, and voluntary contributions. In 1814, Reverend Edward Parker asked Major John Pinkerton and Elder James Pinkerton, who had made significant contributions to the classical high school, to make the school permanent. Later that year, they obtained an act incorporating the school under the name Pinkerton Academy from the state legislature. The academy opened on December 4, 1815, as an all-male institution with an endowment of $16,000 by John Pinkerton "for the purpose of promoting piety and virtue and the education of youth in science, languages, and the liberal arts."

John Morrison Pinkerton, son of Elder James

By 1817, the Pinkerton Academy accepted young women as well. An advertisement placed on May 17, 1817, in the Farmer's Cabinet, the only newspaper of the era serving that part of New Hampshire, stated, "The female apartment in this academy will be opened on Monday the 26th of May, instant; wherein will be taught all the useful and ornamental branches of female instruction usually attended in similar institutions. At the same time an additional instructor will be placed in the male apartment. The tuition is two dollars a quarter. Board may be had in respectable families, within a convenient distance of the Academy, on reasonable terms." According to the New Hampshire Historical Society, preceptresses of the academy were Sarah Fitz, 1816, Mary Knight, 1817–18, and Mary Adams, 1819. In 1821, Pinkerton stopped accepting young women, and the Adams Female Academy opened in Derry to educate young women. For the following years, the Scottish immigrants of Londonderry helped maintain the academy and also contributed funds for it. In 1853 the academy became coeducational with the erection of a ladies' boarding hall.

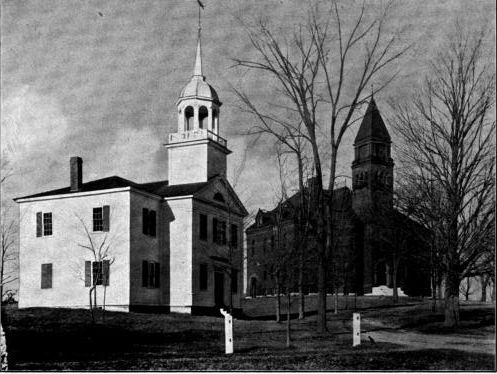
The two original school buildings. The right building is the one created using John Pinkerton's bequest.

In 1881, upon the death of John Morrison Pinkerton, son of Elder James, the academy received a second bequest. The Trustees used these funds to increase the number of instructors and to provide for an enlarged and advanced program of studies. Changes in the curriculum and the completion of the Pinkerton Building in 1887 allowed Pinkerton students to choose from a variety of college and non-college bound programs of study. The funds were also used to buy a library and to erect a new school building. This was a large erection, but was completed quickly and the scenic landscape accented the beautiful new buildings.

Pinkerton continued to function as an independent day and boarding school until 1948. In 1949, the academy entered into an agreement with the town of Derry that marked a significant turning point in the school's history. As a result of the service agreement, Pinkerton educated all high school aged students who lived in Derry. The town of Derry paid for the school's services on a per pupil tuition basis. Although Pinkerton maintained its private school status, the academy began to function as a comprehensive independent academy.

In 1962, the town of Derry negotiated a long-term contractual agreement with Pinkerton Academy. The contract specified the terms and conditions under which Pinkerton's services were purchased. Over the next thirty years, additional communities (Chester, Hampstead, Auburn, Londonderry and Windham) signed service contracts with the academy. In response to the increased number of public school students attending Pinkerton, new facilities were built. Due to the changing needs and interests of this larger student population, Pinkerton once again developed new courses and fields of study while maintaining its existing college preparatory programs. In 1978, the citizens of Londonderry voted to end their tuition agreements with the academy and established Londonderry High School. Students from Windham also no longer attend Pinkerton Academy and now attend Windham High School which opened in 2009.

In recent years several new buildings have been constructed, including two new buildings in 2013–14 funded by a state grant for Career and Technical Education (CTE): CTE Annex and CTE South. These two buildings house Architecture, Drafting and Design, Environmental Science, Electrical Engineering, Engineering, Manufacturing, Cosmetology and Animal Science. In 2011, the Academy Building opened as the base for the Freshmen Academy model of transitioning 9th graders from middle school to high school, and the Arts and Humanities Center was dedicated in 2002 and is home to the Stockbridge Theater.

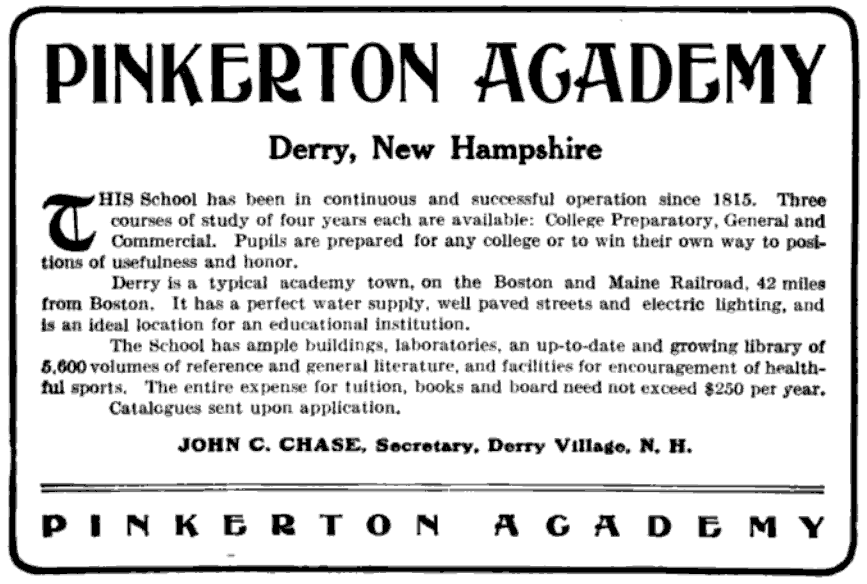
1909 advertisement for the school

In 2011, the town of Auburn, which previously sent the majority of its students to Manchester Memorial High School, voted to change its high school to Pinkerton, with 1,119 in favor and 190 opposing. In 2011 some Auburn students had already chosen to go to Pinkerton.

In 2016 the voters in the town of Candia voted to change their high school from Manchester Central High School to Pinkerton Academy, effective 2018. The votes were 1,090 in favor and 113 against.

== Campus ==
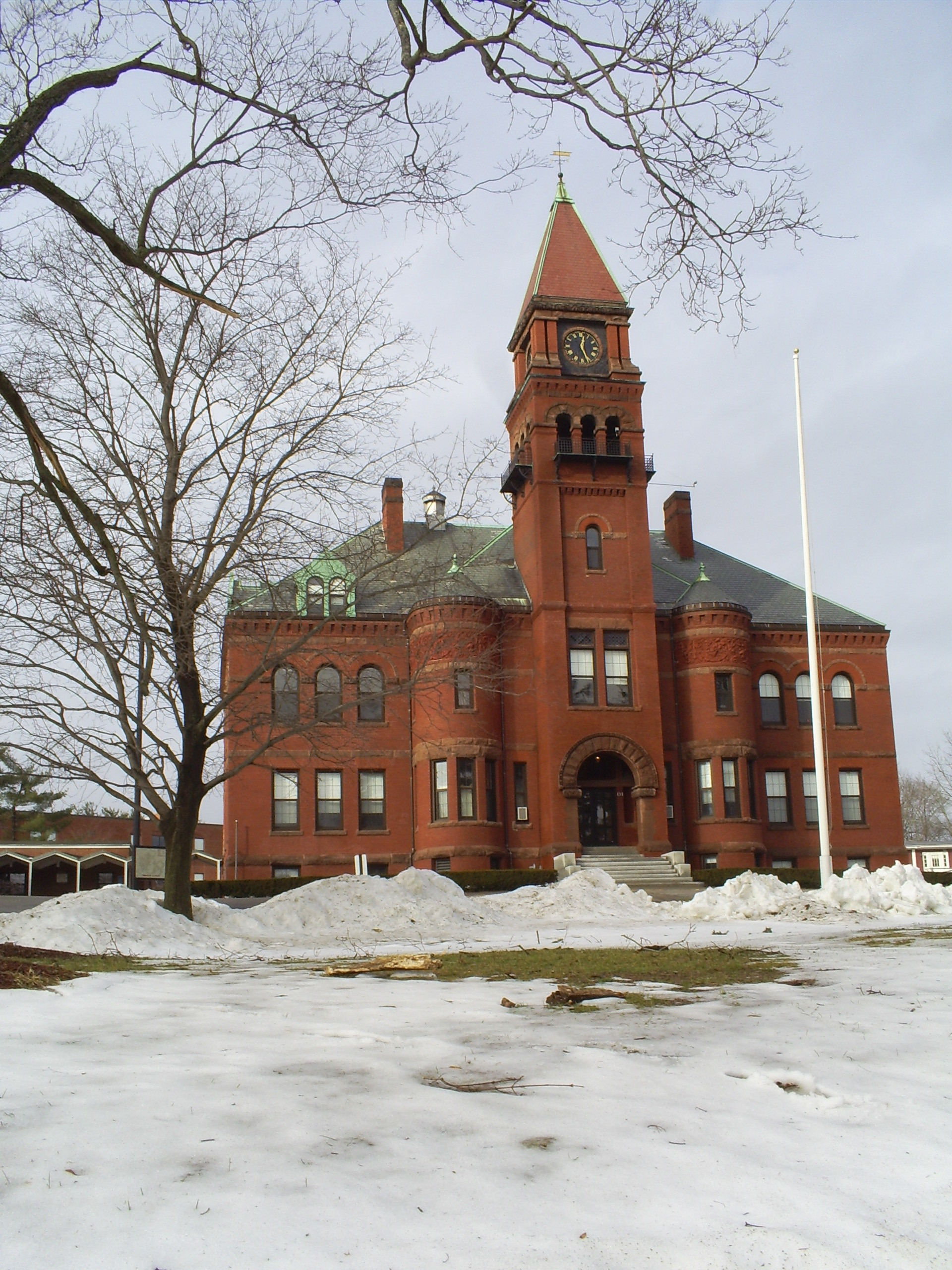
Pinkerton Academy

Pinkerton Academy's property spans over 170 acres (0.69 km^{2}); a 120-acre (49 ha) campus in Derry and a 50-acre (20 ha) forest preserve in Chester. The center of the academy's campus holds buildings where classes are taught, and the surrounding area is used for specific non-academic purposes. The main campus is 8 acres (32,000 m^{2}), leaving 162 acres (0.66 km^{2}) for extracurricular activities. There are 13 academic buildings which are located in the main campus: the Pinkerton Building, the South Building, the Career and Technical Education Annex, the Shepard Building, the Robert Frost Social Studies Wing, the Saltmarsh Library, the freshman Academy Building, the Low Vocational Building, the Ek Science Building, the Hackler Gymnasium, and the Arts & Humanities Building which holds the Stockbridge Theatre. Plays and local events are shown at the Stockbridge Theatre, which seats 850 people.

Some buildings are dedicated to important people of the academy, such as Robert Frost, Alan Shepard, and Ivah A. Hackler. The Pinkerton Building was built in 1887 to replace the original school building. It is named after the Pinkerton family, the original founders of the school, and consists of two stories and a basement. The building now holds Foreign Language classes and administrative offices.

In addition, there are smaller, non-academic buildings around the main campus: the Alumni Building (the original school building), Haynes House, Mackenzie House, Sugar House, and Piper Maintenance Building, among others. 95 acres (380,000 m^{2}) are used for athletic fields, faculty housing, and farmland.

== Academics ==
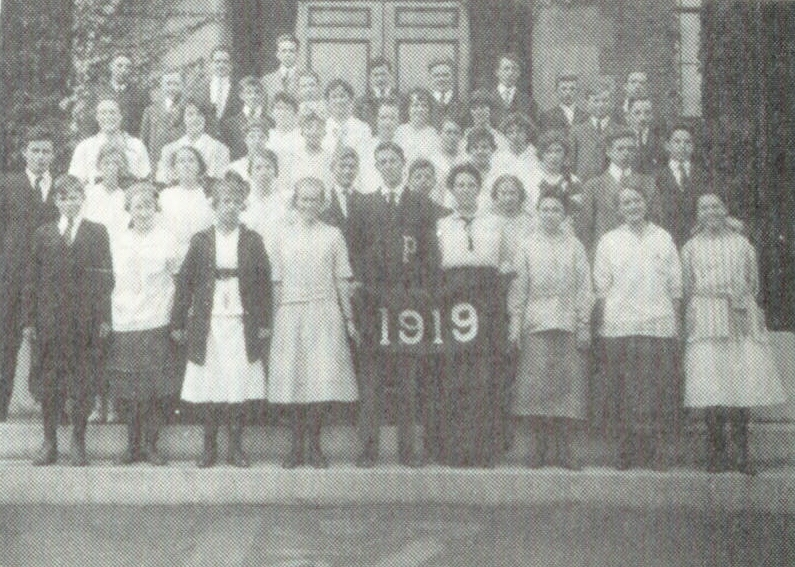
Pinkerton's student body of 1919

In 2005, 158 students took the Advanced Placement exams. The academy also offers college bound and non-college bound courses in each core academic discipline.

Of the class of 2006, 53% were admitted to four-year colleges, 18% went to two-year colleges and 29% were not college bound. The class had an average SAT score of 1525 (out of 2400).

Pinkerton has chapters of FFA, National Honor Society, NJCL, FBLA-PBL, SkillsUSA, FCCLA, DECA, HOSA and other national organizations. Students participate in academic competitions such as the Math Team, Granite State Challenge, and FIRST Robotics.

== Extra-curricular activities ==
=== Athletics ===
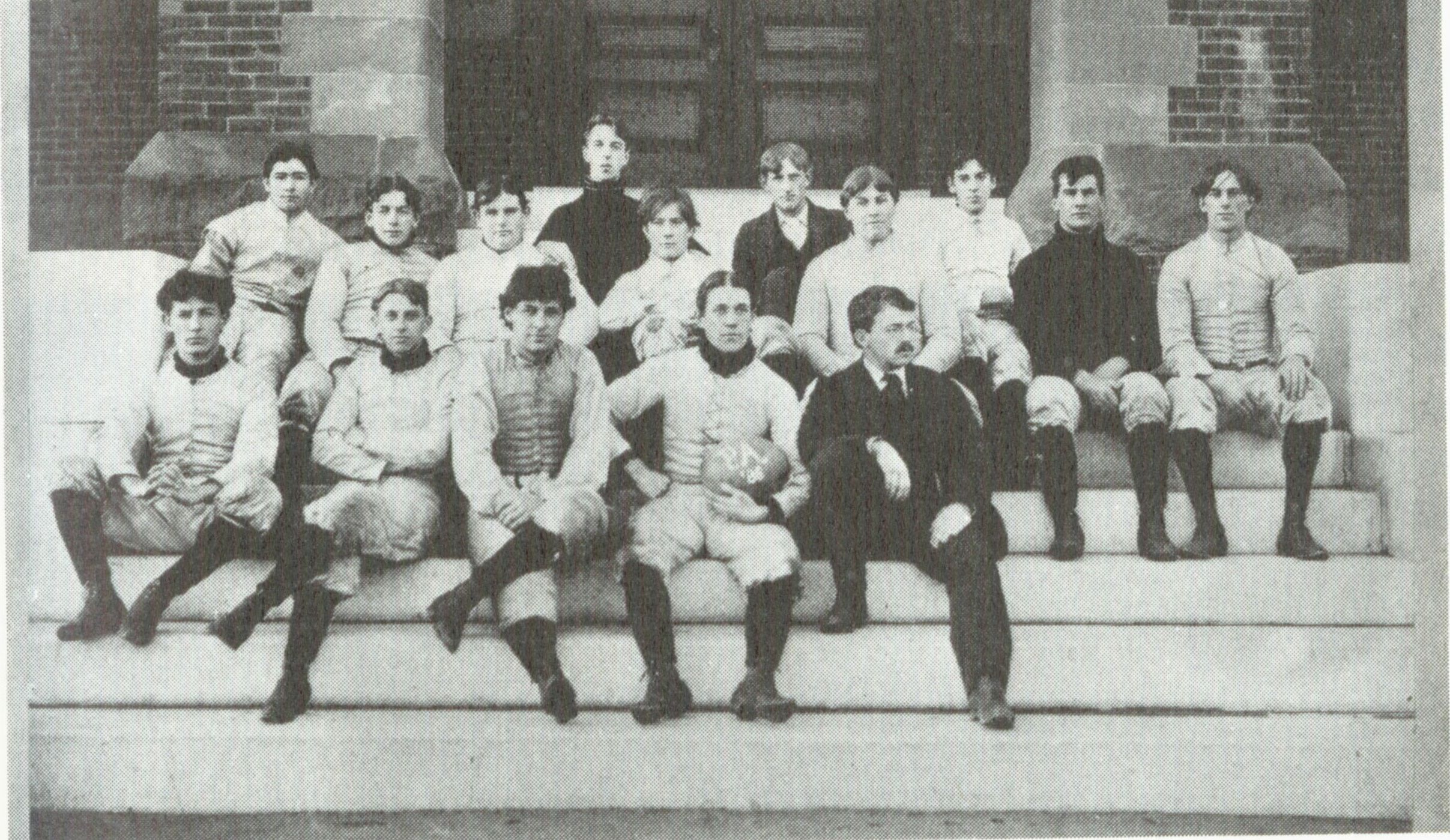
Pinkerton Academy football squad of 1896

Pinkerton offers a variety of 28 sports throughout the school year including football, field hockey, cheerleading, golf, cross-country and soccer in the fall; basketball, gymnastics, ice hockey, track, swimming, alpine ski racing and wrestling in the winter; baseball, volleyball, softball, lacrosse, tennis, and track in the spring. The teams are named the Astros in honor of astronaut and Pinkerton alumnus Alan Shepard, the first American in space. The school's mascot is the Astroman. Team Colors are Red and White. The boys' lacrosse team has won the state championship numerous times, most recently in June 2015, and the football team has won 11 titles, including four in a row in the 1990s.

Football was established in the late 19th century but was later removed due to lack of sufficient funding from tuition. It was revived in 1904. In 1907, the team won the Massachusetts State Interscholastic Title. Other undefeated teams were the 1905, 1915, 1936, 1948, 1984, 1985, 1991, 1993, 2006 and 2014 teams. In 2007, the Pinkerton football team won their third straight state title. In September 2013, the Pinkerton Academy football team played its first ever home night game under the newly installed stadium lights.

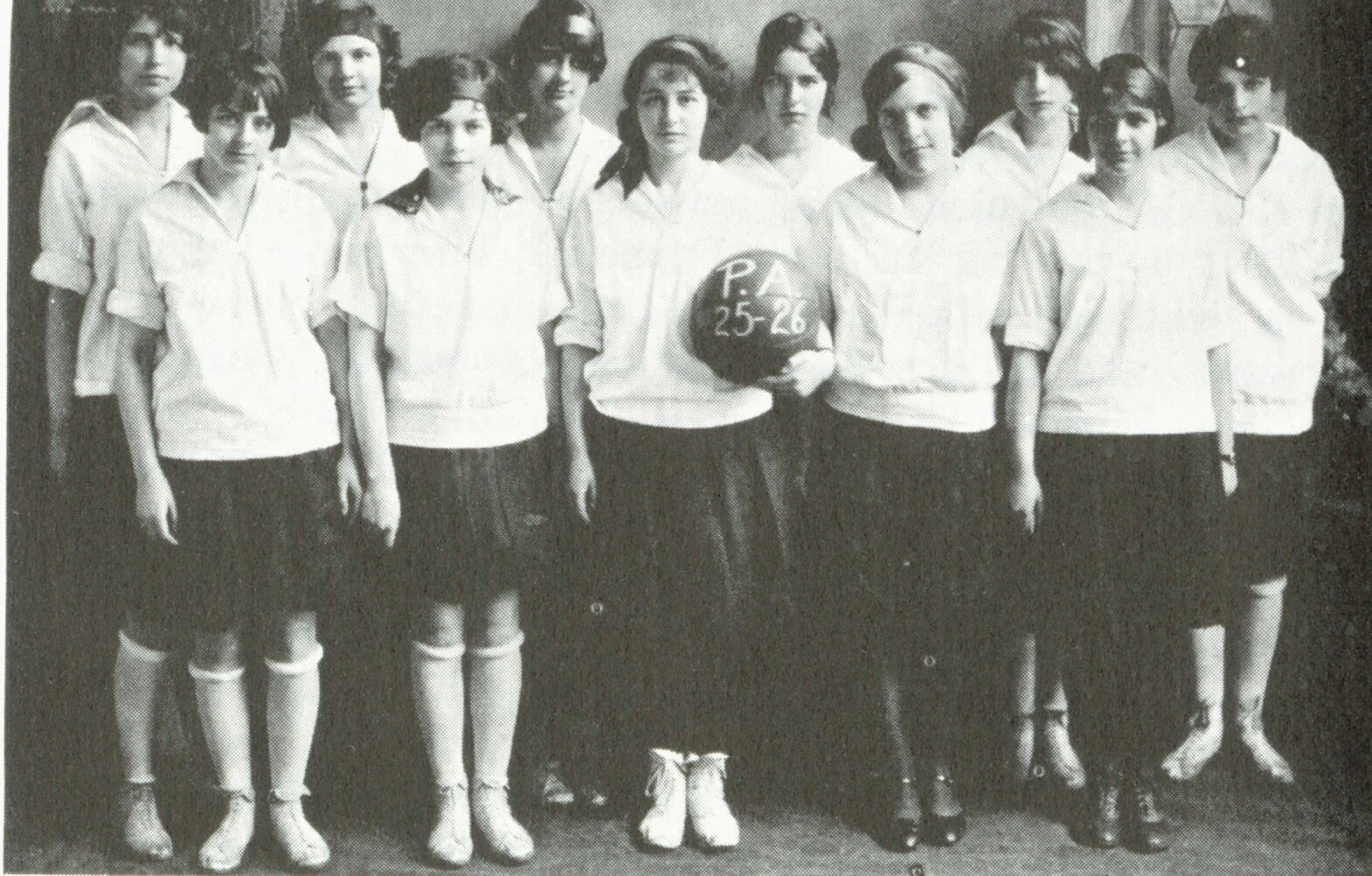
Girls' basketball team 1925

The girls' basketball team was organized in 1913, and won their first championship game in 1934. They were also undefeated in 1957 along with the boys' team, and won their second state championship in 2006.

The cheerleading team has won twenty-four state championships. They have won the fall championship in 2003, 2004, 2005, 2008, 2010, 2011, 2012, 2013, 2014, 2015, and 2016 and the winter championship in 2004, 2005, 2006, 2007, 2008, 2010, 2011, 2012, 2013, 2014, 2015, 2016, and 2017. In the New England competition they placed first in 2008 and 2009.

The boys' cross country team has won the division title 8 times including 4 in a row from 1986 to 1989 and in 1994 had the Footlocker National Cross Country champion Matt Downin. More recently, "The Long Red Line", as the team is called, ranked as high as 23rd in the nation in 2009, and won the state title four years in a row in 2013, 2014, 2015, and 2016.

The former Woodsmen team was the only school team that has competed on the collegiate level. In their final competition year before being dissolved, the team won the 1992 intercollegiate championship, held at Dartmouth College.

=== Special interests ===
The academy allows students to join clubs according to their interests. These clubs include: Asian club, Visual Basic club, Critic (yearbook), Pinkerton Television, Pinkerton Players, Peace Club, International Club, Dance Club, philosophy club, and more. The school also had a Chinese exchange program, where students would raise money to stay at Tianjin with a host family and attend classes in English there. Students from Tanggu No. 1 High School, in exchange, visited Pinkerton.

== Notable alumni ==
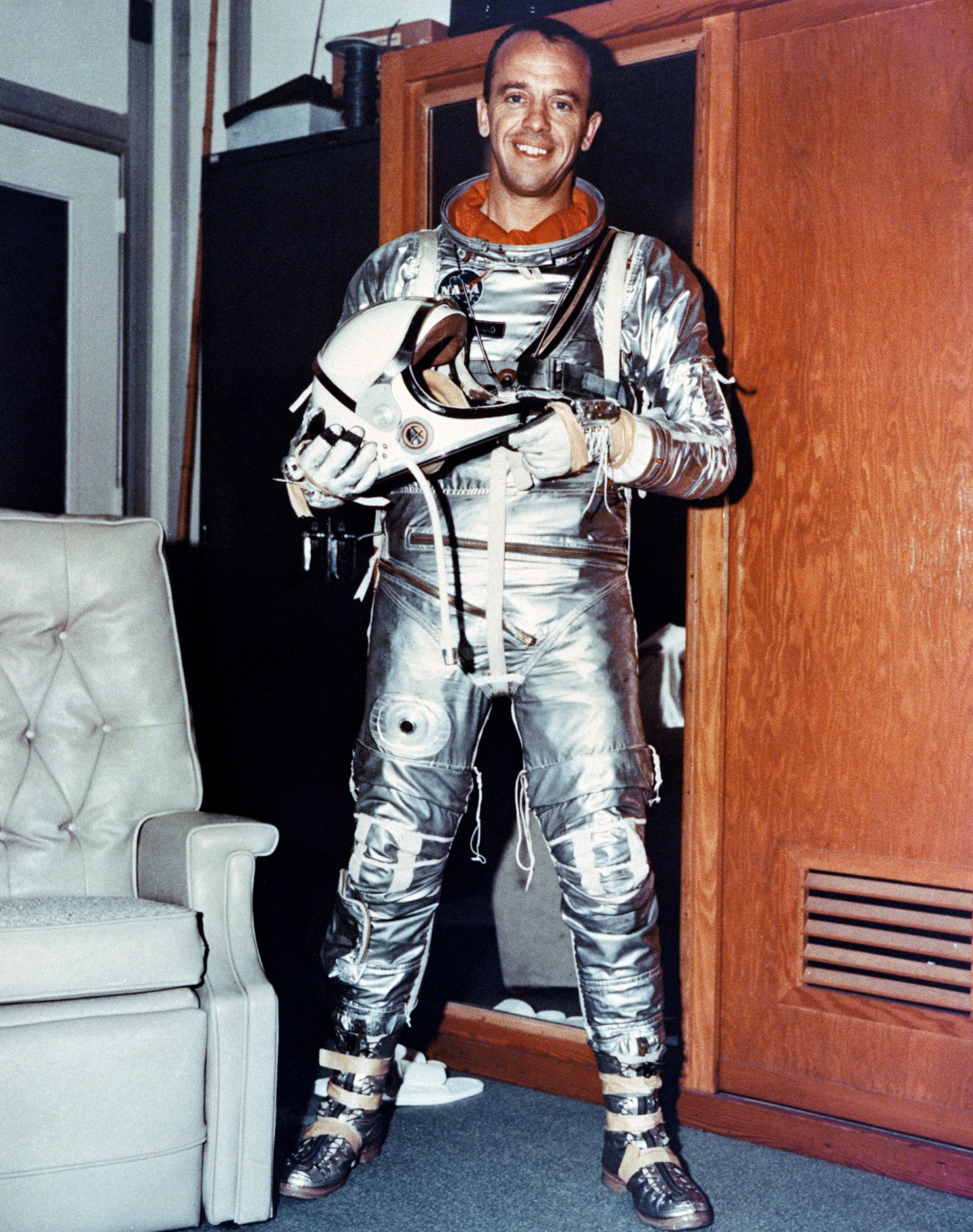
Alan Shepard was part of the 1940 graduating class

- Samuel Colcord Bartlett, former president of Dartmouth College
- Samantha Brown, host of the Travel Channel's Great Hotels, Passport to Europe, and Passport to Latin America
- Zachariah Chandler, mayor of Detroit (1851–52), U.S. Senator from Michigan (1857–75, 1879) and U.S. Secretary of the Interior (1875–1877)
- Lauren Chooljian, radio journalist for New Hampshire Public Radio
- Jim Coburn, Republican candidate in New Hampshire gubernatorial election, 2006
- William A. Crombie, mayor of Burlington, Vermont
- Tricia Dunn-Luoma, American Olympic ice hockey player
- Charles Miller Floyd, Governor of New Hampshire, 1907–1909
- George Cochrane Hazelton, United States Representative from Wisconsin, 1877–1883
- Gerry Whiting Hazelton, United States Representative from Wisconsin, 1871–1875
- Brendan James, singer, songwriter, and pianist
- Edward J. Normand, prominent lawyer known for representing Lloyd's of London in the dispute over the extent that its insurance covered the September 11th attacks on the World Trade Center
- Frank Nesmith Parsons, Chief Justice of the New Hampshire Supreme Court, 1902–1924
- George Washington Patterson, United States Representative and Lieutenant Governor of New York, 1849–1851
- Keri Lynn Pratt, film and television actress
- William Adams Richardson, United States Secretary of the Treasury under the Grant Administration, 1873–1874
- Zach Sanford, NHL hockey player, won 2019 Stanley Cup Finals with St. Louis Blues
- Joe Seiders, musician, drummer for the rock band The New Pornographers
- Andy Seuss, NASCAR driver
- Alan Shepard, first American astronaut in space and fifth person to walk on the Moon
- Pamela Smart, convicted in 1991 of conspiracy to commit murder
- Harriet Elizabeth Prescott Spofford, American novelist and poet
- Aaron Fletcher Stevens, Brevet Brigadier General during the American Civil War, as well as a two-term U.S. congressman

== Notable faculty ==
- Robert Frost, American poet, recipient of four Pulitzer Prizes; taught at Pinkerton 1906–1911
- Jonathan Stanton, ornithologist, professor at Bates College

== See also ==
- New Hampshire Historical Marker No. 266: Pinkerton Academy / Old Academy Building
- Coe-Brown Northwood Academy another semi-private secondary school in New Hampshire.

Connecticut private academies acting as public high schools:

- Gilbert School
- Norwich Free Academy
- Woodstock Academy

Private high schools in Maine which take students with public funds (from unorganized areas and/or with agreements with school districts):

- Foxcroft Academy
- Lee Academy
- Lincoln Academy
- George Stevens Academy
- Waynflete School
- Washington Academy
