= Kingswood Regional High School =

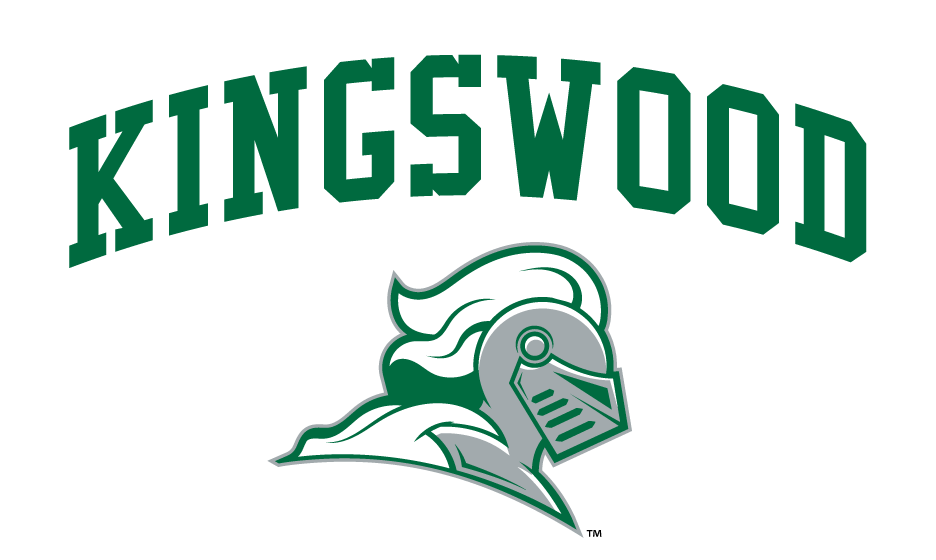

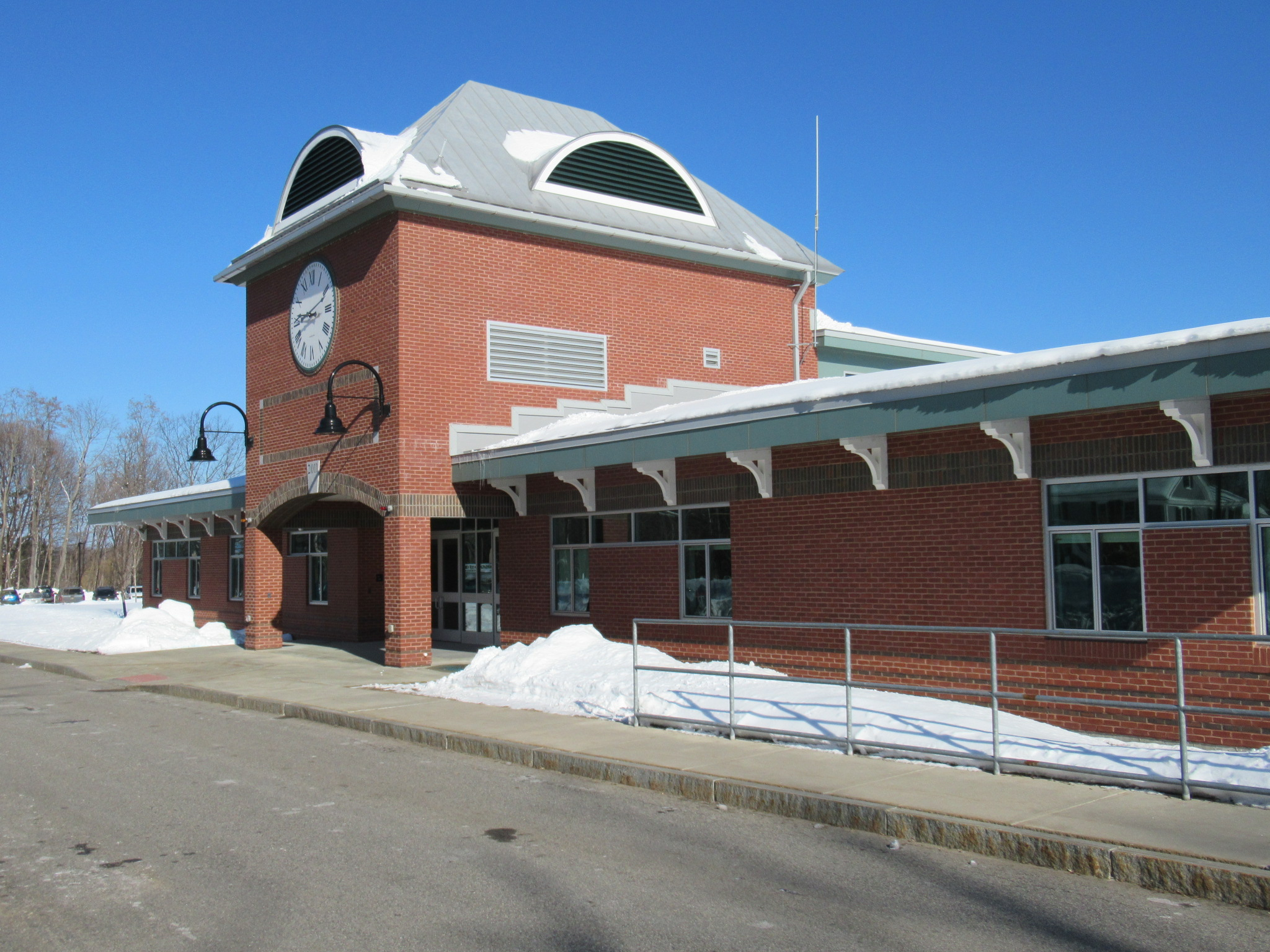

Location
- 396 South Main St. Wolfeboro, NH 03894; United States; 43°34′33″N 71°11′22″W

Information
- Type: Public
- Motto: “With Character”
- Established: 1964
- School district: Governor Wentworth Regional
- Principal: Paul Famulari
- Teaching staff: 65.80 (Full Time Equivalent)
- Grades: 9–12
- Enrollment: 729 (2024-2025)
- Campus: Small town
- Colors: Green and white
- Athletics conference: New Hampshire Interscholastic Athletic Association (NHIAA)
- Mascot: Knights
- Website: Official website

Kingswood Regional High School is a public secondary school located in Wolfeboro, New Hampshire. It serves the communities of Brookfield, Effingham, Ossipee, New Durham, Tuftonboro, Middleton and Wolfeboro. There are approximately 900 students currently enrolled in the school, which is part of the Governor Wentworth Regional School District.

Also on the premises is the Lakes Region Technology Center, which serves several surrounding schools including Prospect Mountain.

The athletic teams are known as the Kingswood Knights and are rivals with Kennett High School in Conway.

== Student body ==
Currently, there are 932 students enrolled at KRHS. Of those students, 926 are Caucasian, 4 are African American, and 2 are Asian/Pacific Islander. 50.8% of the students are male and 49.2% are female. With the full-time equivalent of 69.2 classroom teachers, the student-teacher ratio is 13.468:1.

== Renovations ==
The Kingswood complex (high school, middle school, vocational center and athletic fields) recently completed a major renovation. Priced at over $60 million, the renovation included constructing over 300 geothermal wells to offset heating costs, a multipurpose auditorium and arts center (opened in December 2010) separate from the school buildings, expansions to all three existing buildings, refurnishing and refitting all classrooms, and a complete exterior refacing. The start of the 2011–12 school year was delayed by three weeks due to asbestos found in the old auditorium upon tearing it down. The school complex opened for the 2012–13 school year as a brand new, renovated school.

The new school features a dance studio, a state of the art weight room, a greatly expanded quantity of lockers, a lecture hall, a larger cafeteria, a state of the art media center, more class space, and the $27 million arts center.

== Notable alumni ==
- James Foley, journalist (1992)
