= Salem High School (New Hampshire) =

Coordinates: 42°46′49″N 71°12′46″W

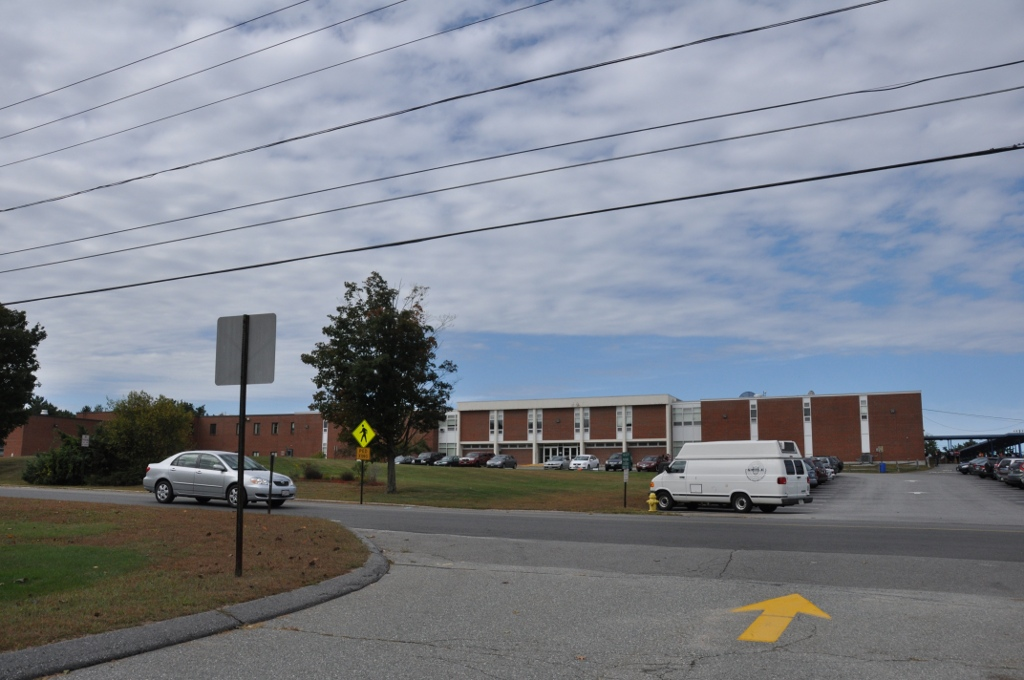

Location
- 44 Geremonty Dr. Salem, New Hampshire 03079; United States

Information
- Type: Public high school
- Established: 1966
- Principal: Jeffrey Dennis
- Teaching staff: 101.10 (FTE)
- Grades: 9–12
- Enrolment: 1,114 (2023–2024)
- Student to teacher ratio: 11.02
- Campus: Suburban
- Colors: Royal blue and white
- Mascot: Blue Devils
- Website: Official website

Salem High School is a public high school located in Salem, New Hampshire, United States. As of 2011, approximately 1,600 students were enrolled. The high school is a comprehensive school, housing both traditional and vocational learning opportunities. Established in 1966, Salem High has gone through various renovations. The school offers many unique classes, ranging from astronomy to television production.

== History ==
The original high school for the town of Salem was Woodbury High School. In the 1960s it was converted to a middle school, and the current building was built. The school has previously suffered from overcrowding, leading administrators to place portable classrooms on the campus. This also led the neighboring town of Windham, whose students were sent to Salem, to construct its own high school in 2009. The class of 2011 was the last graduating class from Salem High to include students from Windham. All class of 2012 students from Windham were required to transfer to Windham High School, starting at the beginning of the 2009-2010 school year.

Senior Safe Night started when students decided to camp out at the high school. Chaperones were eventually called for when students were believed to be involved in illicit behavior in their tents. It has grown from a student-led initiative to one run by the communities. Many of these are parents of children in the high school, who want to make sure the seniors can have one last night to hang out before graduation. They have created an environment in which there are no drugs or alcohol. There are usually door prizes and a massive yearbook signing towards the beginning of the night, when teachers are there to wish the students fun on their night in.

On March 11, 2014, Salem voted to approve a $75 million renovation project for Salem High School and its Career and Technical Education Center. Construction was completed in 2018.

== Demographics ==
For the 2020–21 academic year, Salem High School (New Hampshire) enrolled 1,131 students, according to the National Center for Education Statistics. The school employed 101.0 full-time equivalent educators, resulting in a student to teacher ratio of 11.2:1.

Enrollment by race and ethnicity (2020–21)
Race and ethnicity^{†}	Enrolled pupils	Percentage
African American	9	0.8%
Asian	52	4.6%
Hispanic	116	10.26%
Native American	1	0.09%
White	922	81.52%
Native Hawaiian, Pacific islander	1	0.09%
Multi-race	30	2.65%
Total	1,131	100%
^{†} "Hispanic" includes Hispanics of any race. All other categories refer to non-Hispanics.

Enrollment by gender (2020–21)
Gender	Enrolled pupils	Percentage
Female	561	49.6%
Male	570	50.4%
Non-binary	0	0%
Total	1,131	100%

Enrollment by grade (2020–21)
Grade	Enrolled pupils	Percentage
9	285	25.2%
10	289	25.55%
11	295	26.08%
12	261	23.08%
Ungraded	1	0.09%
Total	1,131	100%

== Extra-curricular activities ==
=== Athletics ===
Salem High School was listed by Sports Illustrated in 2008 as having the best athletics program in the state of New Hampshire.

82 State Championships have been won by the Blue Devil athletic programs. The most recent is the 2025 Girls Wrestling Team State Championship.

The varsity football team were state champions in 2009, defeating Nashua North and have won 4 other championships with football championships in 1995 (Division II), 1983 and 1975 (Division I), and in 1957 (Division IV) as Woodbury High School.

The men's varsity basketball team won the Class L state championship in 2007 and 2008 (the first championship in 1995). The field hockey team won the state championship game six times between 2002 and 2008. Softball has won seventeen Class L state championships (When?-2010), Coach Harold Sachs recorded his 500th win on May 24, 2011. The softball program won its 19th State Championship in 2021.

The boys' volleyball team has a national record 112-match win streak and have won ten straight state championships (2004–2014) according to NFHS.org. Along with 11 State Championship Banners overall hanging from the Davis Gym rafters.

Its currently rivalry in athletics is with Windham High School with "The Battle of Route 111" since their high school opened in the past 10 years. Previously the Blue Devils had "The Battle of Route 28" with Pinkerton Academy of Derry, however they still maintain a healthy rivalry. Other rivals include Timberlane Regional of Plaistow and Londonderry High School. The football team used to have Thanksgiving Day rivalries with the Hillies of Haverhill High school in the 90’s and the Lawrence High School Lancers from 2010-2014 (Lawrence finishing with a 3-2 record).

=== Performing arts ===
The Salem High School Performing Arts program offers Chorus, Theater Arts, Band and Color Guard. The bands program consist of performing ensembles including Marching Band, Concert Band, Jazz Band, Orchestra, as well as the Salem Blue Devils Winter Percussion Ensemble. The band program strives to enrich the lives of students through various music experiences. The marching band is open to all students, Grades 9-12,(8th graders have been invited to perform at games previously) who have previously studied a musical instrument either in or out of school. The Marching band have performed in the Macys Thanksgiving Day Parade, and the Fiesta Bowl Parade. The theater arts program performs in the Seifert Performing arts center every year in a fall and spring play.

=== Clubs ===
As of September 2018, there were 33 individual clubs students could choose to join. There are multiple student organizations such as the LABTA Club and the Muslim Student Association. Other academic based clubs include National Honor Society, Math Team, Language Clubs, and Homework Club. Other clubs are career and technical skills based, like FBLA, Film Club, Girls Who Code, and the Robotics Club.

== Notable alumni ==
- Matt Frahm, racing driver
- Pamela Gidley, actress and model
- Breanne Hill, actress
- Katie King-Crowley, Olympic gold medalist in ice hockey
- Dan Stemkoski, StarCraft 2 eSports commentator
- John E. Sununu (class of 1982), former U.S. senator
- Valerie McDonnell (class of 2022), youngest-ever New Hampshire state legislator
