= Monadnock Regional High School =

Coordinates: 42°52′25″N 72°16′48″W

Monadnock Regional Middle-High School
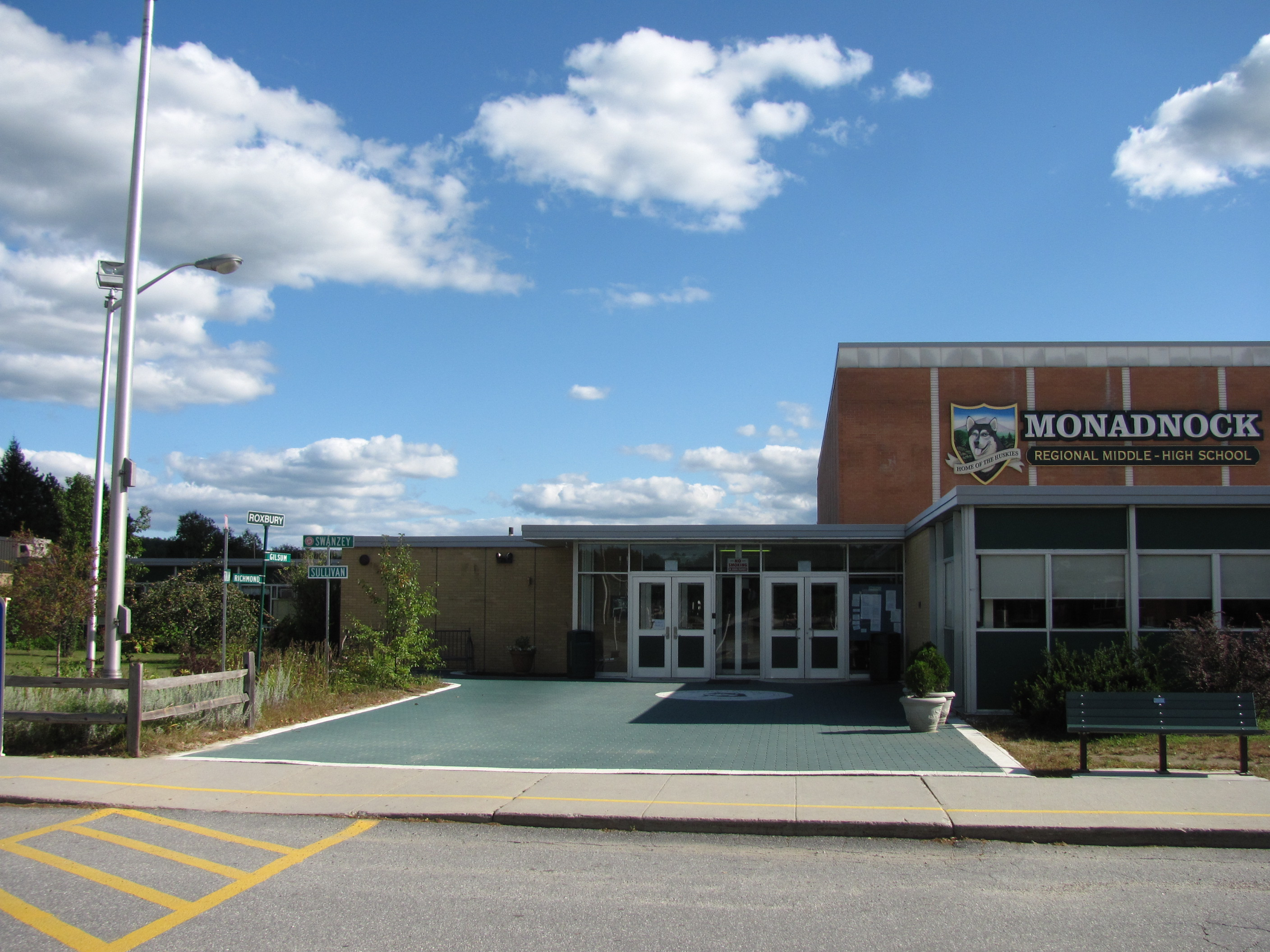

Location
- 580 Old Homestead Highway; Swanzey, New Hampshire 03446; United States

Information
- Type: Public secondary
- Established: Early 1962
- School district: Monadnock Regional School District
- Principal: Brett Gottheimer
- Grades: 7-12
- Enrollment: 445 (2023-2024)
- Campus: Rural
- Colors: Green and white
- Mascot: Alaskan husky
- Nickname: Huskies
- Website: mrmhs.mrsd.org

Monadnock Regional Middle High School is a public school in Swanzey, New Hampshire. The school serves six towns in the Monadnock region, including Fitzwilliam, Gilsum, Richmond, Roxbury, Swanzey, and Troy. Monadnock was established in 1962 when the district was founded, and named after a nearby landmark, Mount Monadnock.

== Middle school ==
The middle school is no longer considered separate from the high school. It is in the same building as the high school and shares many facilities. This led to the school's change of name. In addition, the middle school sees a bell schedule that is different from the regular high school bell schedule.
