= Granite State Challenge =

American game show

Granite State Challenge is an American television quizbowl game show that airs on New Hampshire PBS and began in 1983.

== Description ==
High schools from around the state compete against each other to win "brainy bragging rights" and grant money for their school. The first season of the program was hosted by Tom Bergeron, in one of his first jobs appearing on television. Starting in the second season and continuing to 2018, Jim Jeannotte took over hosting duties. Jon Cannon became the host in the 2018-2019 season. Prior co-hosts include, Lori Warriner, Tim Estiloz, John Herman, and Alison MacNair (former host of NHPTV's NH Outlook).

The competition features 16 teams in a single elimination tournament competing in half-hour shows that are pretaped over a few weeks and air through the broadcast season. The program previously selected 32 teams to compete on the televised rounds based on state geography and recent appearances; however, after a year-long hiatus, the program required interested teams to complete a written test, with the top-scoring sixteen teams earning spots. The championship game is called the Superchallenge.

Since 1995, part of the funding for Granite State Challenge comes from proceeds of the New Hampshire Lottery Commission. Unitil Corporation is also one of the show's primary sponsors. Beginning in 2008, each episode is available to view on YouTube and to download at no charge on iTunes. Since 2012/2013, the winners of the NHPTV Granite State Challenge faces off against the WGBH High School Quiz Show Champions for a trophy called the "Governors Cup". Since the Governor's Cup started, New Hampshire (NHPTV) has 2 wins and Massachusetts (WGBH) has three wins. This practice has since ended and the two states no longer face off.

== Rules ==
The game is played by two teams of four, and uses a four-quarter format.

The first quarter is a round of toss-up questions worth 10 points each. In the 30th season, one 30-point toss-up based on the year 1984 was included.

The second quarter is a three-strikes format with ten 10-point questions for each team. One team plays at a time, with players taking turns to answer questions individually. A wrong answer earns the team a strike, with three strikes ending that team’s turn. Each team gets three passes to share among themselves, but they can only communicate through body language and not verbally to determine whether to pass a question or not. In this round, each question’s subject matter influences that of the following question.

The third quarter is the show's "60-second" round. Since the 30th season, the teams' alternates (if any) participate in this round only. The trailing team gets the first choice of three categories, and the leading team picks from the remaining two. Each team gets 60 seconds to answer 10 questions in their category, with each question worth 10 points. A 10-point bonus is awarded for answering all questions correctly.

The fourth quarter is a final round of 20-point toss-ups. Since the 30th season, 20 points are deducted should a team provide an incorrect answer.

The winning team advances in a season-long tournament. Previously, in the final, titled "Granite State SuperChallenge," there were seven rounds: the first, fifth, and seventh are toss-up rounds, the second and fourth rounds are toss-ups followed by bonuses, and the third and sixth rounds are the 60-second lightning rounds. However, since the 30th season, the SuperChallenge lasts four rounds.

== Past champions ==
This is a list of past GSC winners since 1983.

- 1983-84 Londonderry def. Laconia (inaugural championship, inaugural champion also has longest title drought)
- 1984-85 Phillips Exeter Academy def. Hollis/Brookline (school's only title)
- 1985-86 St. Thomas def. Winnisquam (school's only title)
- 1986-87 Bishop Guertin def. Merrimack
- 1987-88 Winnisquam def. Hollis/Brookline (5th Anniversary)
- 1988-89 Alvirne def. Pinkerton
- 1989-90 Laconia def. Woodsville
- 1990-91 Hanover def. John Stark
- 1991-92 Portsmouth def. Dover
- 1992-93 Winnisquam def. John Stark (10th Anniversary, first repeat champion)
- 1993-94 Alvirne def. Kearsarge
- 1994-95 Laconia def. Keene
- 1995-96 Plymouth def. Woodsville
- 1996-97 Keene def. Oyster River (school's only title)
- 1997-98 Salem def. Derryfield (15th Anniversary)
- 1998-99 Oyster River def. Profile
- 1999-2000 Kearsarge def. Derryfield (school's only title)
- 2000-01 Oyster River def. Trinity (first championship in back to back appearances)
- 2001-02 Salem def. Winnisquam
- 2002-03 Hanover def. Winnacunnet (20th Anniversary)
- 2003-04 Winnisquam def. Trinity
- 2004-05 Alvirne def. Inter-Lakes
- 2005-06 Manchester West def. Winnacunnet (school's only title)
- 2006-07 Hanover def. Derryfield
- 2007-08 John Stark def. Winnacunnet (25th Anniversary, school's only title)
- 2008-09 Hollis/Brookline def. Phillips Exeter Academy (school's only title)
- 2009-10 Manchester Central def. Hanover (school's only title)
- 2010-11 Bishop Brady def. ConVal (school's only title)
- 2012-13 Plymouth def. Hanover
- 2013-14 Pinkerton def. Bishop Guertin (school's only title)
- 2014-15 Bishop Guertin def. Pinkerton
- 2015-16 Nashua High School South def. Merrimack High School
- 2016-17 Nashua High School South def. Bedford High School (first championship in consecutive years)
- 2017-18 Salem def. Plymouth (Jim Jeannotte's last season as host)
- 2018-19 Plymouth def. Littleton High School
- 2019-20 Merrimack def. Plymouth
- 2020-21 Merrimack def. Bow
- 2021-22 Portsmouth def. Merrimack
- 2022-23 Merrimack def. Plymouth
- 2023-24 Merrimack def. Plymouth
- 2024-25 Merrimack def. Tilton
- 2025-26 Nashua High School South def. Plymouth

Schools with Multiple Titles:

Five Titles

- Merrimack High School (2019-2020, 2020-2021, 2022–23, 2023–24, 2024–25)

Four Titles

• Nashua High School South (2025–26, 2016-2017, 2015–16, 2025-26)

Three Titles Apiece

- Hanover (2006–07, 2002–03, 1990–91)
- Alvirne (2004–05, 1993–94, 1988–89)
- Winnisquam (2003–04, 1992–93, 1987–88)
- Salem (2017–18, 2001–02, 1997–98)
- Plymouth (2018–19, 2012–13, 1995–96)

Two Titles Apiece

- Oyster River (2000–01, 1998–99)
- Laconia (1994–95, 1989–90)
- Bishop Guertin (2014–15, 1986–87)
- Portsmouth High School (1991-1992, 2021-2022)
