= Timothy Smith (American politician) =

American politician

Tim Smith
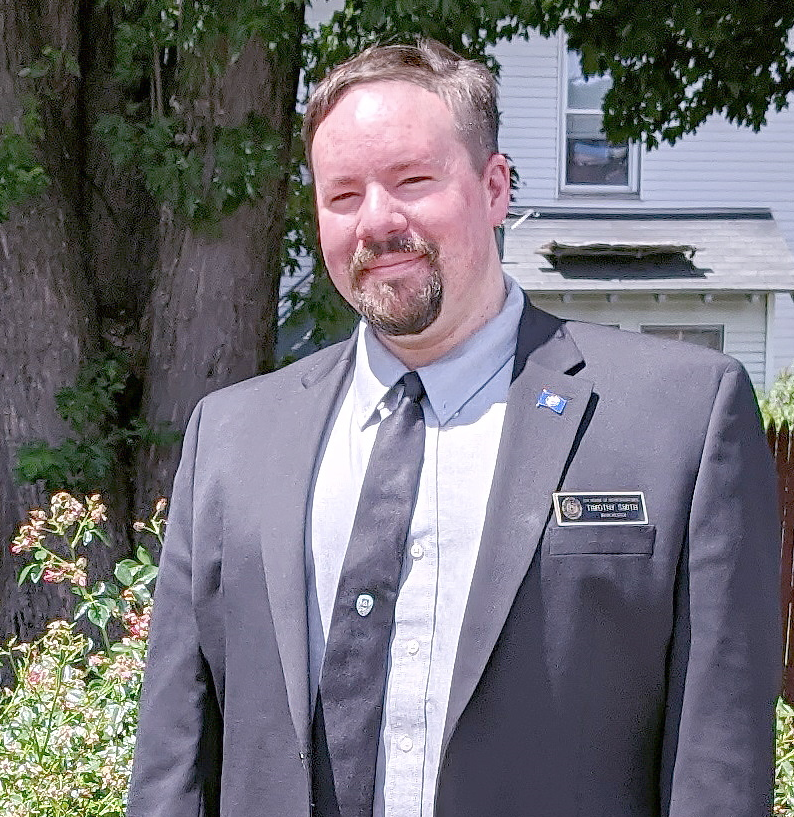

Member of the New Hampshire House of Representatives from the Hillsborough 17th district
- In office December 2012 – December 7, 2022

Personal details
- Born: February 17, 1980 (age 46) Northampton, Massachusetts
- Party: Democratic
- Education: Kaplan University
- Profession: Information Technology
- Website: www.timsmithnh.com

Timothy J. Smith (born February 17, 1980) is a Democratic member of the New Hampshire House of Representatives, representing the Hillsborough 17th District since 2012. Currently, he serves on the Legislative Administration Committee. He is a member of the American Economics Association and is an officer in the Civil Air Patrol. In June 2015 he was elected to a position on the New Hampshire Democratic Party state committee.

== Civil Air Patrol service ==
He joined the Civil Air Patrol as a cadet in his teenage years, and after leaving the cadet corps rose through the organization to the rank of Major. In 2009 he was transferred from the unit in Nashua to take over as the Squadron Commander for the unit in Manchester New Hampshire.

== Political career ==
In 2012 he first ran for elected office in Manchester, New Hampshire, running in an uncontested primary for State Representative. In his first general election, he was the top vote-getter after earning 27.4% of the vote in a four-way race for two seats. In this election he defeated two incumbents including the chair of the local Manchester Republican Party as well as an incumbent who had been in office for 30 years. In his bid for re-election in 2014 he faced off in a three-way primary for two spots on the general election ballot, and again was the top vote getter with 43% of the vote. He went on to win the general election with 26.4% of the vote, the top slot again among four candidates for two seats. He ran for office again in 2016, 2018, and 2020. In 2015 he was elected to a position on the New Hampshire Democratic Party state committee. During his time in the legislature he has written bills on a variety of topics including overturning Citizens United with a constitutional amendment through Article V of the US Constitution, protecting rape victims against prolonged child custody battles, and raising penalties for corporate crime. During his time in the New Hampshire House Of Representatives he has gained a reputation for using strong language in floor speeches and has attracted attention for his linguistic style, going so far as to openly describe one bill as being a "scam" and calling out other legislators at the podium who supported bills they may have had conflicts of interest on.

Smith was recognized as the 2015 "Young Elected Official Of The Year" by the NH Young Democrats.

At the beginning of the 2019 legislative session, Smith wrote and introduced an amendment to the NH House Rules which required committee chairs in public hearings to recognize members of the public to speak before recognizing lobbyists. Despite it being incredibly rare for rules amendments introduced from the floor (as opposed to going through the Rules Committee) to actually pass, Smith was able to get the amendment through with 200 votes for against 169 opposed. In a social media post, Smith credited this win to appealing to his "fellow legislators sense of duty and civic virtue". When the Republicans gained a legislative majority in the 2020 elections, this rule change was rescinded by the new Republican-led rules committee (Smith is now a member of the Rules committee himself as well, and tried to preserve the rule.)

In his 2020 re-election campaign, Smith was one of the few state legislators in the country to receive a personal endorsement from US Senator Bernie Sanders.

== Involvement in satire controversy ==
In 2013 Timothy Smith was involved in an email discussion with a fellow legislator, Representative Jordan Ulery (R-Hudson), which led to national attention because of an email Representative Ulery had sent to the entire New Hampshire House listserv where he (Ulery) failed to recognize satire news articles, and passed them along as legitimate stories. Timothy Smith sent Ulery a harsh reply, which was also sent Reply-All to all 400 of their fellow legislators, and which someone subsequently leaked to the press for comedy value. Later, Ulery left a comment in response to a post about the incident indicating that after further thought he no longer suspected Smith of leaking the emails. Smith had subsequently stated he did not know how the original website got the story.

== Involvement in resignation of Robert Fisher ==
In 2017, Rep. Smith read into the record evidence that his fellow legislator, Representative Robert Fisher (R-Laconia), was still active on the subreddit "/r/TheRedPill", despite Fisher's prior claims under oath that he had not been active on the forum in years. Smith's actions led House Democratic Leader Steve Shurtleff to call for a perjury investigation against Fisher, which led to Fisher's resignation. The Republican-majority legislative committee had originally voted to "take no action" against Fisher in a party-line vote. Smith voted "Hell no!" on the motion to "take no action" against Fisher.

== 2016 and 2020 presidential endorsements ==
In a post on his public Facebook page, Timothy Smith endorsed Senator Bernie Sanders in the 2016 Democratic presidential primary on Sept 22, 2015, becoming one of the first elected Democrats in the country to do so. He similarly endorsed Sanders again in 2020.
