= Wangari Muchiri =

Kenyan renewable energy engineer

Wangarì Mūchiri
- Born: Nairobi, Kenya
- Education: University of New South Wales; University of Technology Sydney; University of Oxford
- Occupations: Renewable energy engineer, entrepreneur, energy policy expert
- Organization(s): RE.Think Energy; Global Wind Energy Council
- Known for: Renewable energy advocacy, Africa WindPower, RE.Think Energy

Wangarì Mūchiri is a Kenyan renewable energy engineer, energy planning expert, entrepreneur, and climate policy advocate known for her work in advancing wind energy and renewable energy deployment, sustainability, and energy transition policy in Africa.

== Early life and education ==
Mūchiri studied renewable energy engineering at the University of New South Wales and later earned a master's degree in energy planning and policy from the university of Technology Sydney. She also has an Executive MBA at the University of Oxford.

== Career ==
Mūchiri has worked across renewable energy, sustainability, green buildings, and climate action in Africa, Australia, and other regions. She was a board member of the Kenya Green Building Society and served as head of its technical committee.

Mūchiri joined the Global Wind Energy Council as the Global Director for Africa leading its Africa WindPower initiative. In this role she brings together governments, regulators, developers, investors, and industry stakeholders to scale wind energy on the continent.

Mūchiri is the founder RE.Think Energy, a clean energy venture focused on scaling Africa's renewable energy future. She serves on several boards and advisory platforms, including the Kenya Green Building Society, ESI Africa Clarion Energy Advisory Board, and Buildings and Cities Journal Practitioners Panel.

== Recognition ==
Mūchiri was selected as an Obama Foundation Africa Leader in 2019. She has also been recognized by Insider as a climate leader, by GWEC, and as part of the African Power & Energy Elites.

She was listed in the Choiseul 100 Africa 2025 ranking as Africa Director at the Global Wind Energy Council and Global Renewables Alliance. Africa Women Experts also listed her among notable African women leaders in the energy sector and reported her recognition in the Choiseul ranking and Insider's women in climate leadership list.

== Public speaking and advocacy ==
Mūchiri is a public speaker on renewable energy and Africa's energy transition. She has appeared on energy and climate platforms including COP28, Africa Energy Forum-related events, and the Global Africa Business Initiative.

Her advocacy focuses on expanding Africa's renewable energy capacity, improving policy and investment conditions, strengthening local supply chains, and positioning Africa as an active shaper of the global clean energy transition rather than only a recipient of climate finance and technology.
