= Charlie St. Clair =

American politician (1950–2026)

Member of the New Hampshire House of Representatives from the Belknap 5th district
- In office December 7, 2022 – August 22, 2026

Member of the New Hampshire House of Representatives from the Belknap 9th district
- In office 2017 – December 2, 2020
- Preceded by: Robert Fisher
- Succeeded by: Travis O'Hara

Personal details
- Born: Charles G. St. Clair; April 16, 1950 Laconia, New Hampshire, U.S.
- Died: August 22, 2026 (aged 76) Cleveland, Ohio, U.S.
- Party: Democratic
- Education: University of Colorado-Boulder

Charles G. St. Clair (April 16, 1950 – August 22, 2026) was an American non-profit leader and politician who was executive director of Laconia Motorcycle Week from 1991 until his death in 2026. A member of the Democratic Party, he served in the New Hampshire House of Representatives from 2017 to 2020 and again from 2022 until his death.

== Early Life ==
Charles G. St. Clair was born in Laconia, New Hampshire, on April 16, 1950. He graduated from Laconia High School in 1969. He attended Bryant & Stratton College in Boston and majored in history with a minor in education at University of Colorado-Boulder.

== Career ==
St. Clair taught at elementary and high schools in Colorado and Massachusetts, worked as a cab driver in Boston, and owned a video business in Brookline, Massachusetts. He returned to Laconia to work for the Laconia Motorcycle Week Association. From 1991 until his death, he was executive director of Laconia Motorcycle Week. He also ran a restaurant, The Colorado Club, for a few years before giving it up to focus on his work with the Association. In 2015, he led an effort to bring Keene, New Hampshire's annual Pumpkin Festival to Laconia.

== Politics ==
St. Clair was elected to the New Hampshire House of Representatives in 2017. He defeated Republican Steven Whalley, brother of former House minority leader Michael Whalley, 1,268 votes to 1,010 in a special election to fill the vacancy caused by Robert Fisher's resignation following a controversy over his posts on the subreddit "/r/TheRedPill". He defeated Whalley by 37 votes in 2018, but was defeated in the 2020 election by Travis O'Hara. St. Clair returned to the House in 2022 when he was elected to one of four seats in the Belknap 5 district. St. Clair also served as mayor of Laconia from September 2025 until January 2026.

== Death ==
On August 4, 2026, St. Clair was severely injured en-route to the Sturgis Motorcycle Rally when one of his tires blew out in Avon, Ohio. He was treated at MetroHealth Medical Center, where he died from heart failure on August 22, at the age of 76.
