= John Stark Regional High School =

Location
- 618 North Stark Highway; Weare, New Hampshire 03281; United States; 43°07′38″N 71°45′31″W

Information
- Type: Public
- Motto: Regard, Respect, Integrity
- Founded: 1987
- Principal: Gary Dempsey
- Teaching staff: 52.90 (FTE)
- Enrollment: 610 (2022–2023)
- Student to teacher ratio: 11.53
- Campus: Rural
- Colors: Blue, scarlet, and white
- Fight song: The Generals Fight Song
- Mascot: Generals
- Website: www.jsrhs.net

John Stark Regional High School is a coeducational regional public high school in Weare, New Hampshire serving the communities of Weare and Henniker, New Hampshire. It is part of School Administrative Unit (SAU) 24, and is administered by the John Stark School District. John Stark Regional is named after General John Stark, who served in the American Continental Army during the American Revolutionary War.

== History ==
John Stark Regional High School was created to serve the communities of Weare and Henniker, and was built in 1987 with the support of both towns.

After years of overcrowding, a $5 million addition/renovation project was approved by the voters of Weare and Henniker on March 14, 2000, but the project was delayed due to a legal challenge to "Senate Bill 2," which allowed towns to pass building projects with an approval of sixty percent of balloted votes versus the two-thirds majority of those towns using the town meeting form of government. The project was allowed to proceed in the spring of 2002, and construction began in June 2002.

At the start of the 2006–2007 school year, soda and other unhealthy foods became prohibited from being sold during school hours.

== Demographics ==
The demographic breakdown of the 614 students enrolled for the 2020–2021 school year was:

- Male - 51.4%
- Female - 48.5%
- Native American/Alaskan - 0%
- Asian/Pacific islander - 0.4%
- Black - 0.2%
- Hispanic - 2.1%
- White - 92.5%
- Multiracial - 4.7%

== Athletics ==
John Stark Regional High School offers several athletic programs throughout the year. The team name for most athletic programs is the John Stark Generals. Fall sports include Bass Fishing, Cross Country, Field Hockey, Football, Golf, Soccer, and Volleyball. Winter sports include Alpine Skiing, Basketball, Ice Hockey, Swimming, Unified Basketball, Varsity Robotics, Winter Spirit, and Wrestling. Spring sports include Baseball, Lacrosse, Softball, Track, Unified Outdoor Track, and Volleyball. Additionally, the school also has a quiz bowl team which participates in the Granite State Challenge on NHPBS. The team won the 2008 tournament defeating Winnacunnet. The school's track and field team contains 48 members, 30 male, 18 female.
