= Benjamin Marshall House =

Historic house in New Hampshire, United States

- U.S. National Register of Historic Places
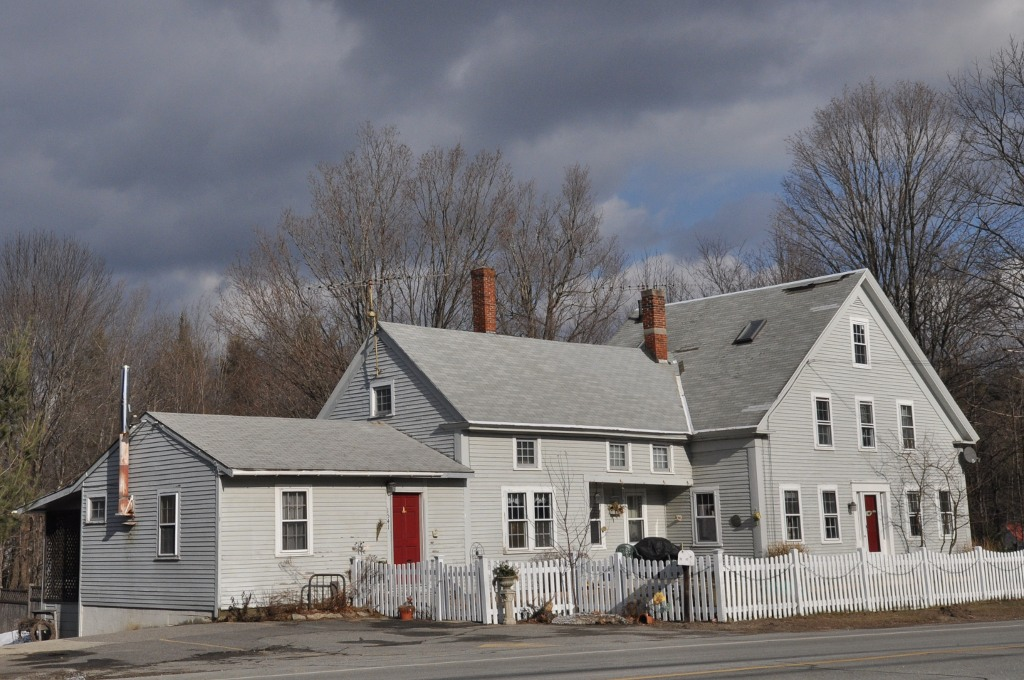

- Location within New Hampshire Location within the United States
- Location: 1541 Peterborough Rd., Dublin, New Hampshire
- Coordinates: 42°54′5″N 72°1′28″W
- Area: 1.5 acres (0.61 ha)
- Built: 1821
- Architect: Benjamin Marshall
- Architectural style: Greek Revival
- MPS: Dublin MRA
- NRHP reference No.: 83004046
- Added to NRHP: December 15, 1983

The Benjamin Marshall House is a historic house at 1541 Peterborough Road (New Hampshire Route 101) in Dublin, New Hampshire. Built sometime between 1821 and 1833, it is a well-preserved example of a vernacular Greek Revival farmhouse. It was listed on the National Register of Historic Places in 1983.

== Description and history ==
The Benjamin Marshall House is located in eastern Dublin, standing prominently at the northwest corner of New Hampshire Route 101 and Brush Brook Road. It is a rambling wood-frame structure, with a large 2 1/2-story main block, and a series of ells that extend west along the road, and to the building's rear. The main block presents a gable end to the street, with a five-bay ground floor, three-bay second floor, and a single window in the attic level. The main entrance is framed by sidelight windows, with secondary entrances in the two ells to the west.

The oldest portion of the house, now probably a portion of its main block, was built in 1821 as a Cape-style 1 1/2-story structure by Benjamin Marshall, a local carpenter and blacksmith who had his workshop on the property. Marshall greatly enlarged it in 1833. A number of its owners have been prominent in local affairs, serving as town selectman and road agent. In the late 20th century the house was owned by schoolteacher and folk musician Bob McQuillen, who called it "The Quacker Box".

== See also ==
- National Register of Historic Places listings in Cheshire County, New Hampshire
