= Winnacunnet =

Winnacunnet is a word derived from one of the Algonquian languages and may mean "beautiful place in the pines". Other sources suggest a meaning of "place of pines" or "beautiful long place."

The word has been transliterated in a variety of ways. Massachusetts Bay Colony Governor John Winthrop used the spelling "Winicowettas". A Hampton Union article from circa 1959 mentions "Winnacunnet", "Winnicunnet", "Wenicunnett", "Winnicummet", and "Winicumet" among the variations.

In 1638, the "Plantation of Winnicunnet" was founded by Reverend Stephen Bachiler and others from Massachusetts. The following spring, the town was renamed Hampton.

== See also ==
- Winnecunnet Pond, also known as Lake Winnecunnet, Norton, Massachusetts.
- Winnacunnet High School, a school in Hampton, New Hampshire (a town originally known as the "Plantation of Winnacunnet").
