= Winnisquam Regional High School =

High school in New Hampshire, United States

Coordinates: 43°26′37″N 71°36′13″W

Location
- 435 West Main Street; Tilton, (Belknap County), New Hampshire 03276; United States

Information
- Type: Public high school
- Principal: Angela Friborg
- Teaching staff: 27.50 (FTE)
- Enrollment: 399 (2023-2024)
- Student to teacher ratio: 14.51
- Colors: Royal blue, black and white
- Nickname: Bears

Winnisquam Regional High School is a public high school located in Tilton, New Hampshire, in the United States. They are commonly known as the Bears, which is their school mascot. Students of the school are primarily from the towns of Sanbornton, Tilton, and Northfield, though some other towns are represented. The school is commonly referred to by its abbreviation, "WRHS".

In 2001, funds in the amount of $17 million were approved by the tri-town area in an effort to completely renovate the school as well as construct a new gymnasium and additional classroom space. During the renovation, the much beloved Star Wars mural that had covered the main wall of the old cafeteria had to be dismantled.

Winnisquam Regional High School operates a school of agricultural science in a separate building on its main campus. This "Ag Center" allows Winnisquam students, as well as students from nearby towns, to take vocational classes in agriculture, animal science, horticulture, and forestry for high school credit. The center maintains a greenhouse which grows a wide variety of flowers and plants.

== Athletics ==
All of the Winnisquam athletics teams are known as the Bears. The school fields teams during all three seasons, including:

Fall

- Cross country (M/F)
- Soccer (M/F)
- Field hockey (F only)
- Volleyball (F only)
- Football
- Unified soccer (M/F)

Winter

- Basketball (M/F)
- Wrestling (traditionally M only)
- Spirit and cheerleading (traditionally F only)
- Indoor track (M/F)
- Unified basketball (M/F)
- Ice hockey (M/F)

Spring

- Baseball (M)
- Softball (F)
- Track and field (M/F)
- Unified volleyball (M/F)

The girls' volleyball team has been a prominent program for the last nine years, with four Division III state championships (2010, 2012, 2017, 2018) and two Division III runners-up (2013, 2015). The volleyball team has played in the finals in six out of the last nine years and has a record of 149 wins and 23 losses from 2010 to 2018.

Field hockey has been one of the school's most successful programs in recent years, winning the NHIAA Class M-S state title seven times between 1990 and 2004, appearing in the championship eleven times in all during that span. The cheerleading team has also been very successful over the years and won the state championship in 1996 and 2008. Track and field has also been one of the school's strong performers, including one title and six runner-up finishes for the boys since 1996, as well as two titles and three runner-up finishes for the girls in the same span.

The boys' soccer team had one of the more memorable performances of any NHIAA team in fall 2007, starting the season 3-7 before winning eight of their next nine to reach the Class M state championship, where they would finish runner-up. Winnisquam tied for the lowest rank of any NHIAA finalist during the fall 2007 season (11th, also achieved by Portsmouth field hockey) and earned the school's soccer program its first championship appearance in 44 years.

Winnisquam has also had a very historic wrestling program. Established in 1972 it is one of the original wrestling programs in New Hampshire history. Its best year on record was in 2015 when the team placed 3rd at the state tournament.

Winnisquam football appeared in the state championship game for the first time in the 2009 season. The Bears went undefeated in the 2018 season and beat Franklin in the championship, becoming Division IV state champions and winning their first title.

Winnisquam cross country was a dominant force in the 1950s and 1960s, racking up seven championships and five runners-up.

Winnisquam baseball won its first state championship in 2010. Jordan Cote, a star pitcher for the Bears, was drafted in the third round, 118th overall, by the New York Yankees in 2011.

== Activities ==
The school competes in many regional, statewide, and national events. It fields a math team, a robotics team, an award-winning FFA chapter, and a Granite State Challenge team, notable for its record five championship appearances and three state titles.

== Middle school ==
Winnisquam Regional Middle School is located less than 100 yards from Winnisquam Regional High School. Its sports teams are known as the Wolves. A student vote changed the mascot from the Warriors to the Wolves in the late 1990s.

== Music department ==
Winnisquam Regional High School also has a tremendous amount of participation in its music department. More than 1/3 of the entire school is involved in it, including the top-tier singers in the Chamber Choir. Their music department goes to Six Flags annually after competing against other schools in an end of the year music festival, in which they have won multiple awards in multiple categories for the past five years.

== Notable alumni ==
- Robert Fisher, former member of the New Hampshire House of Representatives
