= Travis O'Hara =

American politician

Member of the New Hampshire House of Representatives from the Belknap 9th district
- In office 2020 – December 7, 2022
- Preceded by: Charlie St. Clair

Member-elect of the New Hampshire House of Representatives from the Belknap 4th district
- Assuming office December 7, 2022
- Succeeding: Travis Toner (elect)

Personal details
- Party: Republican

Travis O'Hara is an American politician. He serves as a Republican member for the Belknap 4th district of the New Hampshire House of Representatives.
