= Nashua Public Library =

Library in Nashua, New Hampshire, United States

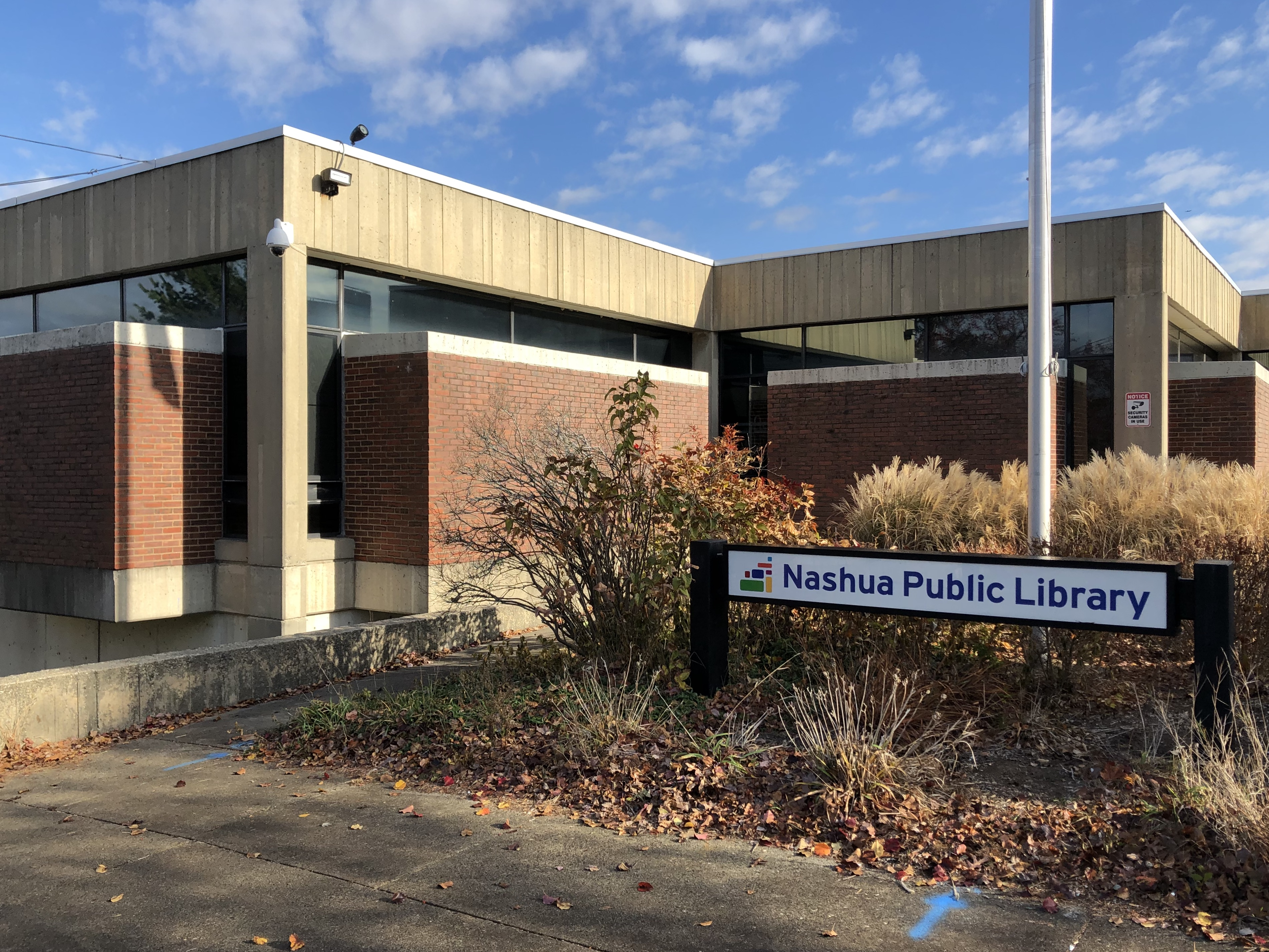
- 42.763172°N 71.464440°W
- Established: 1867

Collection
- Size: 179,626

Access and use
- Circulation: 729,904
- Population served: 86,494

Other information
- Budget: $2,766,703 (2012)
- Director: Jennifer McCormack
- Website: www.nashualibrary.org

The Nashua Public Library (NPL) is the public library of Nashua, New Hampshire.

== History of Nashua Public Library ==
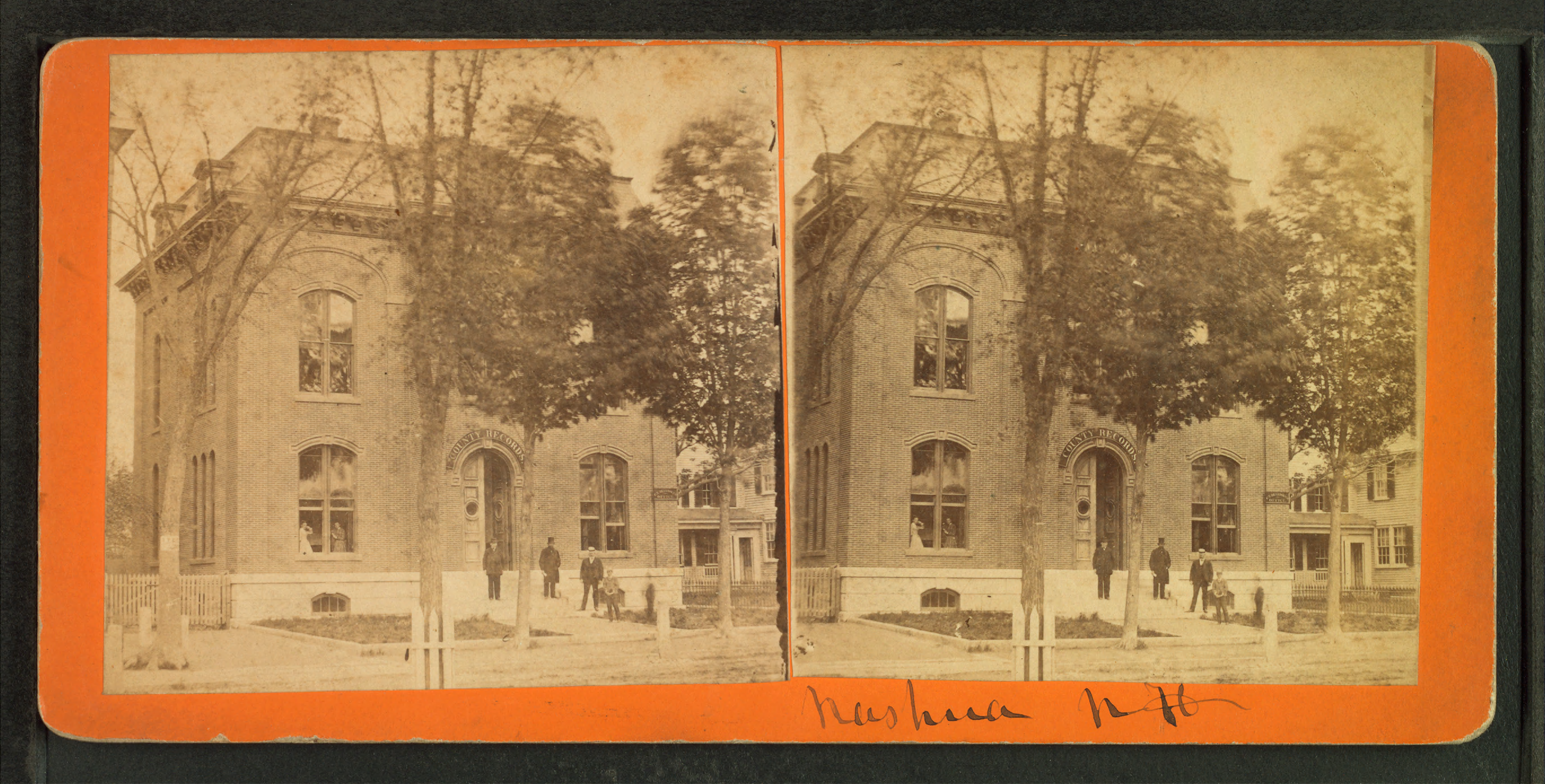
Old stereoscopic image of the County Records building

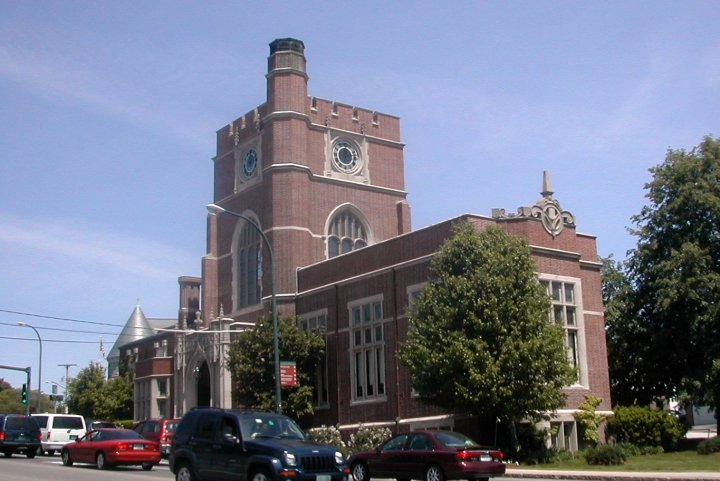
Former location, when it was called Hunt Memorial Library

In 1867, the Nashua Public Library was established. It was located on the second floor of the County Records Building. The Union Athenaeum, a private reading club formed in 1851, and the holdings from the Nashua Manufacturing Company’s library were donated to the new public library.

In March 1901, approval was given to start work on a new building for the library due to a donation from Mary A. and Mary E. Hunt. It was designed by architect Ralph Adams Cram in the Gothic Revival style. In 1903, two and a half years later, the Hunt Memorial Library was opened. It was named in memory of John M. Hunt.

=== Chandler Memorial Library ===
In 1959, the Victorian home of Seth D. Chandler, a Nashua businessman, was left to the city, by his daughter Mabel Chandler, to serve as a branch library to the Nashua Public Library. The house was renovated and dedicated on October 10, 1960, as the Chandler Memorial Library. It served as the library's Children's Room and later as its ethnic center until closing its doors for budgetary reasons in July 2006.

=== Present location ===
In 1971, the library moved to its present location, a 57,000-square-foot (5,300 m^{2}) building at 2 Court Street. Funding for the library was provided by a gift from Eliot A. Carter, a local industrialist. The architect of the building was his son, John A. Carter. The dedication ceremony took place on September 26, 1971.

In 1995 the library expanded into previously unfinished space and opened the Music/Art/Media Wing. In 2017 that space was renovated, creating seven community meeting rooms, and renamed the Chandler Memorial Wing.

=== Publications ===
- In 1978, the Nashua Public Library published The Nashua Experience: History in the Making, 1673-1978, A Definitive History of the City.
- A sequel to this publication,The Nashua Experience: A Three-Decade Upgrade, 1978-2008, written by NPL librarians, was published in 2009.

== Library services ==
=== Reference Department ===
The Reference Department is available by phone, email, or in person. The library has a variety of databases for cardholders to use for personal and academic research. It also has a microfilm collection of local and national newspapers. The Reference Department maintains numerous historical photos depicting the city of Nashua, as well as its citizens, during different eras, which can be viewed in-house or online. The Reference Department also offers cardholders Interlibrary Loan (ILL) services, borrowing materials from in and out-of-state libraries.

The Reference Department maintains the Hunt Room, Nashua Public Library's genealogy and local history room. It houses an extensive reference collection of books relating to the history of Nashua, of New Hampshire, of New Hampshire cities and towns, and of New England. Genealogy resources are also available. The Nashua Public Library is also a State and Federal Depository Library. Documents published by the State of New Hampshire and by the Federal Government are maintained by the Reference Department for in-house use.

Library patrons can use laptop or desktop computers in the Reference Department for job searching, resume building, research, and other professional, academic, and personal uses. The Reference Department offers a variety of computer classes, allowing customers to learn how to navigate computers and the internet. Some of the classes offered include Computer Basics, Word, Excel, PowerPoint, and Genealogy. The library also offers drop-in help sessions for assistance with any computer related questions, a full schedule of all classes can be found on the Computer Classes page.

=== Circulation ===
The Nashua Public Library has an extensive holding of books and other materials, including fiction and nonfiction books, large print books, magazines, newspapers, language learning materials, audiobooks on CD and MP3 CD, music CDs, DVDs, video games, ukuleles, and a telescope. The foreign language collection contains books in eight languages, including French, Spanish German, Lithuanian, Russian, Chinese, Portuguese, and Hindi.

Downloadable audiobooks and Ebooks are available for cardholders through the NH Downloadable Book Consortium website. These can be “checked out” and downloaded to a personal computer, MP3 player, smartphone or other device. Patrons also have access to museum passes to several local and Boston-area museums, zoos, and other cultural attractions. Throughout the year, a variety of films, concerts, and lectures are offered in the library.

Nashua residents, employees, and students can apply for a free library card at the circulation desk. Those who own property in Nashua, or who are retired from work in Nashua, can also apply for a free card. Anyone can search for materials in the online catalog. Cardholders can access their accounts online to reserve and renew items. Cardholders can also log in to compile a list of the library materials they may be interested in checking out in the future.

=== Chandler Memorial Wing ===
The Chandler Memorial Wing has several meeting rooms for use by nonprofit groups: a computer training room, lecture room, conference room, and activity room. Three smaller rooms are available for quiet study or small meetings. Also available is a 75-seat theater.

=== Teens ===
The NPL Teen Room offers teen fiction, teen nonfiction, magazines, manga, graphic novels, and video games; as well as work spaces and computers for recreational and academic use by teens ages 12–17. Programs and activities for teens include crafts, anime club, fandom club, Minecraft and more. During the Teen Summer Reading Program, students can attend additional programming and activities, and read to earn prizes and raise money for charity.

=== Children ===
The NPL Children's Room offers both fiction and nonfiction books for children from birth to age 11. A small collection of foreign language children's books is also available. The parenting shelves contain books, magazines, and pamphlets relating to child-rearing. The Children's Department offers various programs and activities for children including story times and crafts for different age groups.

=== Books by Mail ===
People who live in Nashua and have disabilities that prevent them from visiting the library, or who are visually impaired, are eligible for the library's Books by Mail program. These customers can receive books, audiobooks on CD, or magazines.

== Friends of the Nashua Public Library ==
The Friends of the Nashua Public Library foster public support for and interest in the library. They encourage gifts, endowments, and memorials for public library purposes and foster awareness of and use of the library. They also promote the donation of time and assistance by Nashuans to the library. The Friends seek to provide special programs and services that expand and enrich the library's regular budget. These “extras” include concerts, readings, speakers, children's programs, museum passes, materials, and equipment.
