= Steve Sawyer (environmentalist) =

American environmental activist (1956–2019)

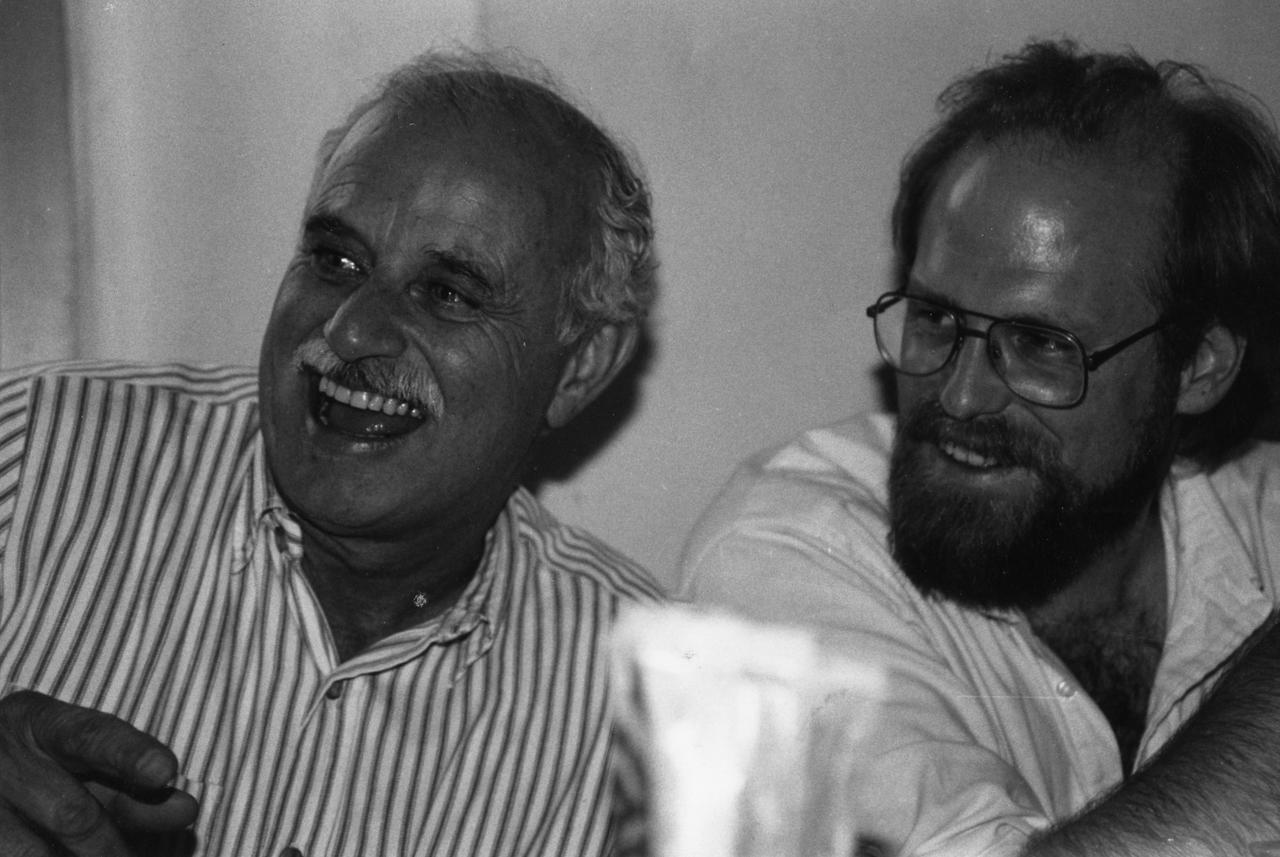
Sawyer (right) with David McTaggart, c. 1986–1987

Stephen Gregory Sawyer (July 10, 1956 – July 31, 2019) was an American environmentalist and activist. He served as a leader of Greenpeace for nearly 30 years, including two decades as executive director. While on a mission to stop French nuclear testing in French Polynesia, he survived France's bombing of the Greenpeace boat Rainbow Warrior, which occurred on his 29th birthday.

After leaving Greenpeace, he co-founded the Global Wind Energy Council in 2007 to promote wind power, and led the organization for ten years.

== Early life ==
Sawyer was born on July 10, 1956, in Boston, Massachusetts. His mother, Frances (Wheeler) Sawyer, was a piano teacher, and his father, Winslow Allen Sawyer, an engineer. He grew up in Antrim, New Hampshire, where he learned how to sail on Gregg Lake. He was a member of the first freshman class at ConVal Regional High School, graduating in 1974.

After graduating from Haverford College in 1978 with a B.A. in philosophy, Sawyer was uncertain of what to do next and lived with friends in Boston as a hippie. When a canvasser of Greenpeace sought donations from him, he decided to join the environmentalist organization, partly because he loved the idea of working at sea.

== Rainbow Warrior ==
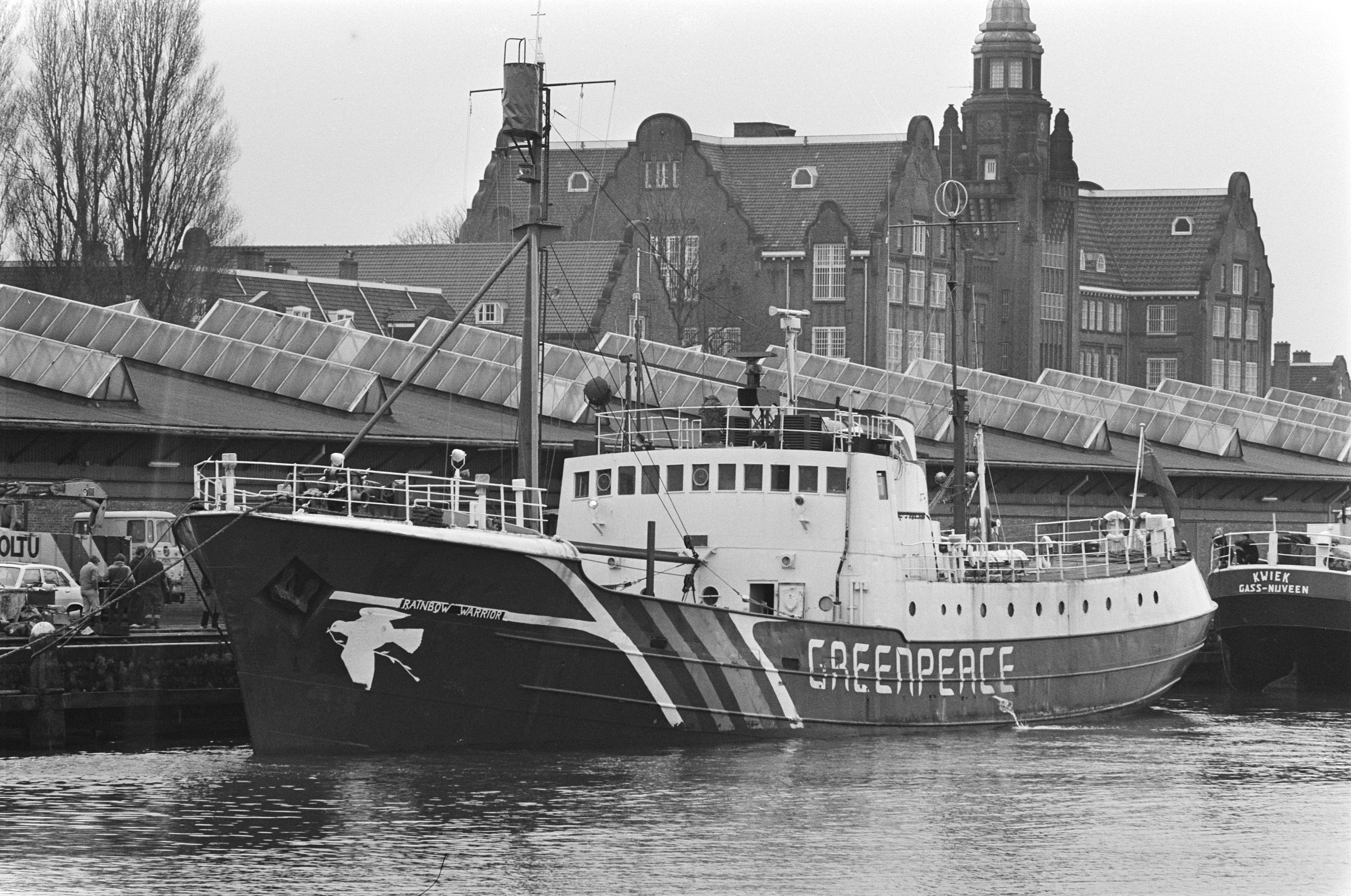
Rainbow Warrior in 1981, Amsterdam

Sawyer led the refitting of Greenpeace's newly acquired boat Rainbow Warrior and joined its crew in 1980 to sail on protest voyages. In 1985, the Rainbow Warrior sailed to the Pacific Ocean on the dual mission to relocate residents of Rongelap Atoll in the Marshall Islands ("Operation Exodus"), and to stop French nuclear testing on Moruroa Atoll in French Polynesia.

In the 1950s, the United States tested hydrogen bombs near Rongelap. The atoll's residents were evacuated in 1954 but returned after it was declared safe in 1957. They subsequently experienced a host of serious health issues, including birth defects, thyroid disorders and cancer, but the US government denied the link between radioactivity and the islanders' problems and refused to evacuate them again. In ten days, Sawyer led the Rainbow Warrior's a dozen crew members to move 300 residents of Rongelap to Mejato Island, about 100 miles (160 km) away, as well as over 100 tons of livestock and building materials. It was the first major humanitarian mission of Greenpeace, which had been generally engaged in protests, and a major challenge for the small crew of the Rainbow Warrior.

=== Bombing of the Rainbow Warrior ===
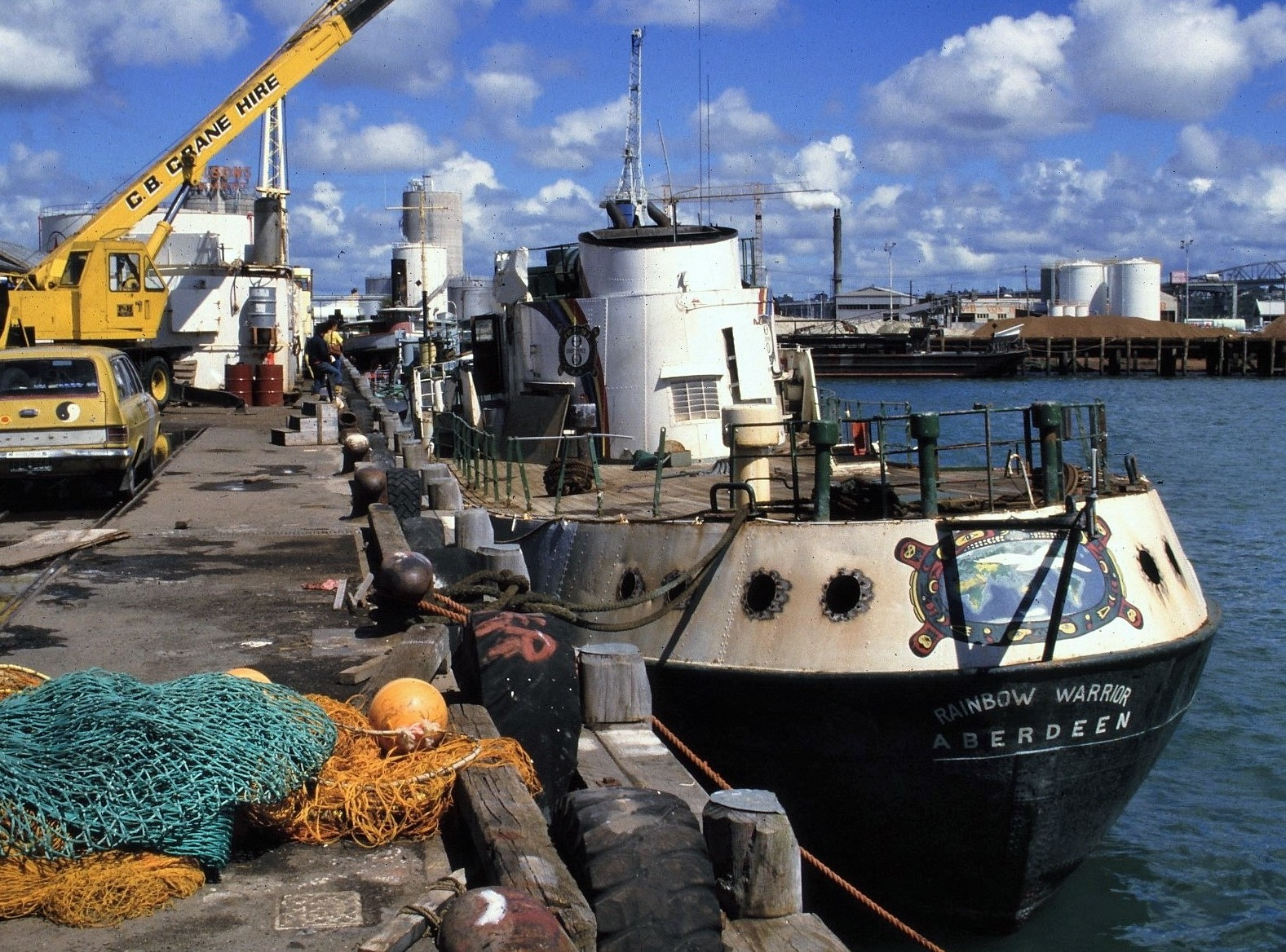
Rainbow Warrior in 1985, Auckland

After accomplishing Operation Exodus, Rainbow Warrior sailed to Auckland, New Zealand, on her way to French Polynesia to stop French nuclear testing. On July 10, 1985, when the crew was ashore celebrating Sawyer's 29th birthday, a bomb exploded on the ship. When photographer Fernando Pereira went back on board to retrieve his equipment, a second bomb exploded, sinking the boat and killing Pereira.

The bombing led to an international outcry, and it was soon discovered that the bombs were planted by French secret agents, two of whom were arrested by New Zealand authorities and sentenced to prison. One of the bombers had attended Sawyer's party and wished him happy birthday. The French government, tainted by the scandal, admitted wrongdoing and ultimately paid Greenpeace US$8 million in damage.

== Leadership of Greenpeace ==
Sawyer's leadership in the Rainbow Warrior mission impressed his colleagues, and he became executive director of Greenpeace USA in 1986. Two years later, he was named executive director of Greenpeace International and moved to Amsterdam, the organization's headquarters.

Under his leadership, Greenpeace achieved some of its greatest victories, including a 1991 treaty forbidding oil and gas exploration in Antarctica for half a century; the Montreal Protocol to phase out chemicals that cause ozone depletion; and a treaty banning the dumping of nuclear waste at sea. Greenpeace's persistent small-boat protests eventually forced France to abandon its nuclear testing in Polynesia, and the United States off Alaska. Sawyer later shifted Greenpeace's focus to fighting climate change and promoting renewable energy.

== Global Wind Energy Council ==
In 2007, Sawyer left Greenpeace and co-founded the Global Wind Energy Council, based in Brussels, to promote wind power. He led the organization for the next ten years, and helped develop the wind power industry in many countries, including China.

== Personal life ==
Sawyer married Kelly Rigg, also a Greenpeace activist, in 1988. They had a daughter, Layla, and a son, Sam.

Sawyer was diagnosed with lung cancer in April 2019. He died on July 31 in Amsterdam from pneumonia caused by the cancer, aged 63.
