= John A. Carter (architect) =

American architect

- Born: June 16, 1924; Nashua, New Hampshire
- Died: January 11, 2017 (aged 92); West Palm Beach, Florida
- Occupation: Architect

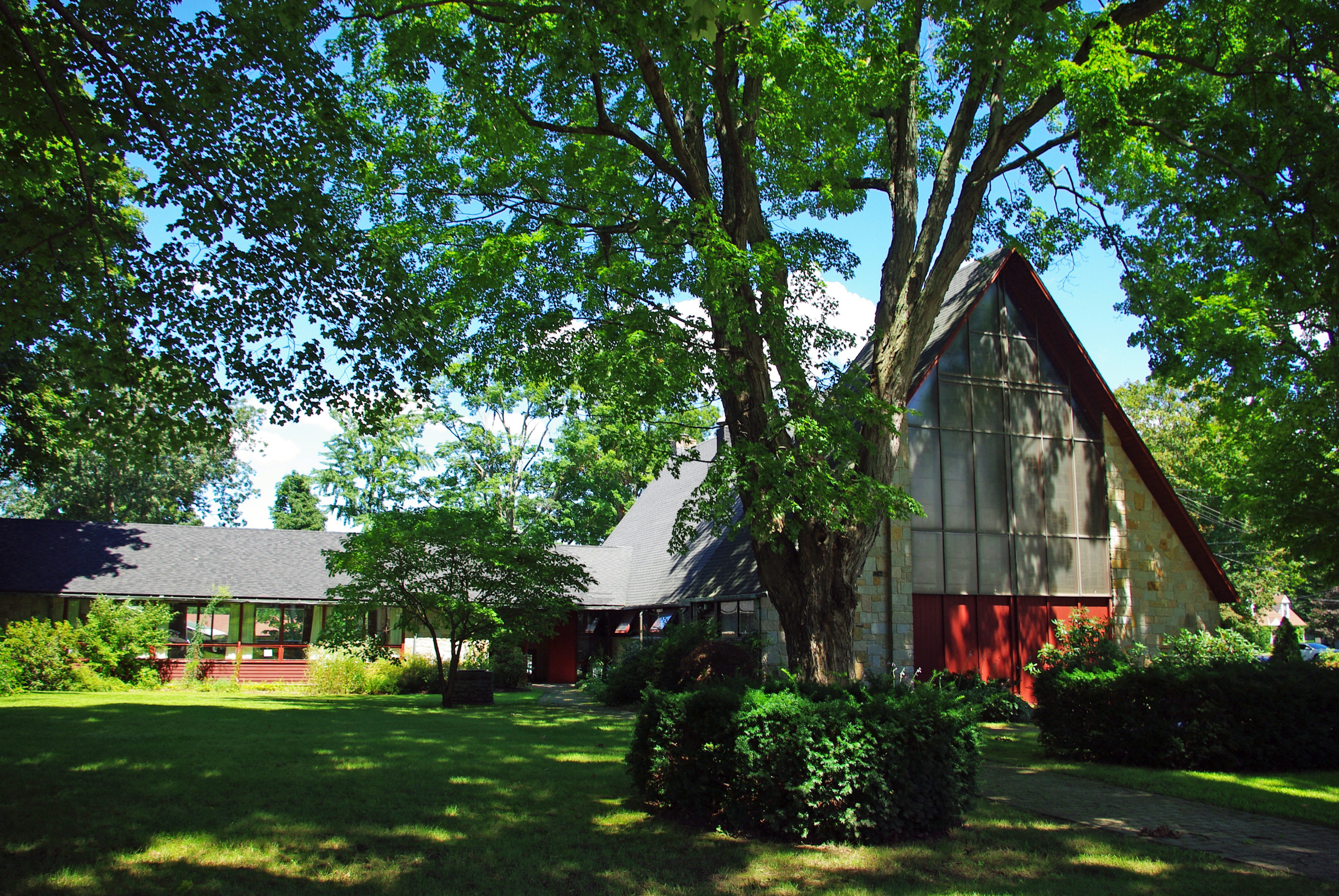
St. George's Episcopal Church in Durham, completed in 1954.

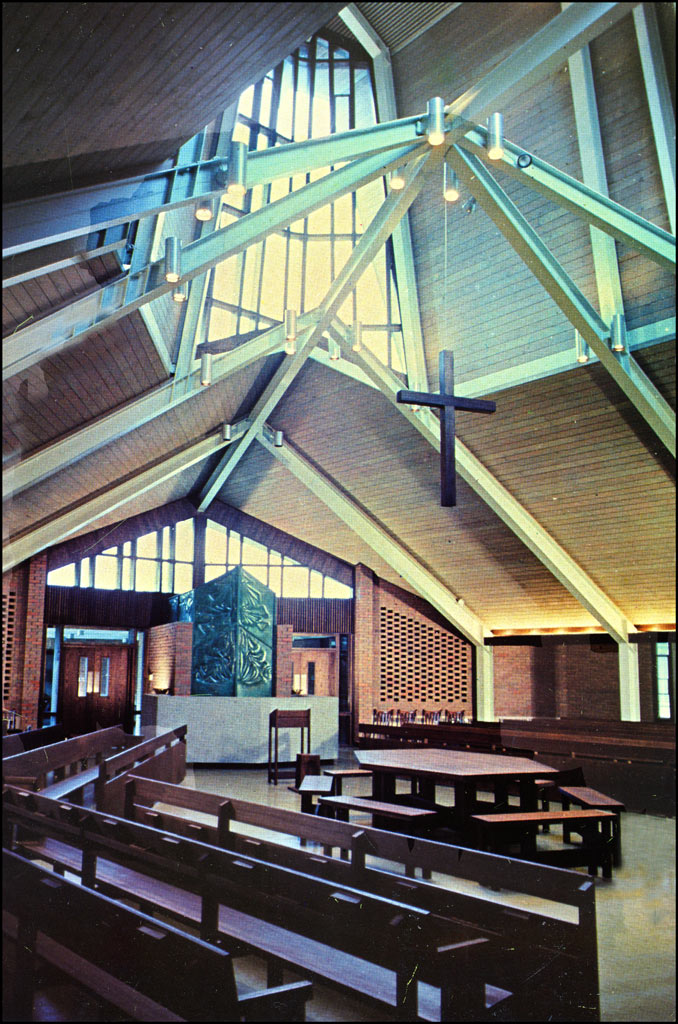
The interior of the First Baptist Church in Keene, completed in 1966.

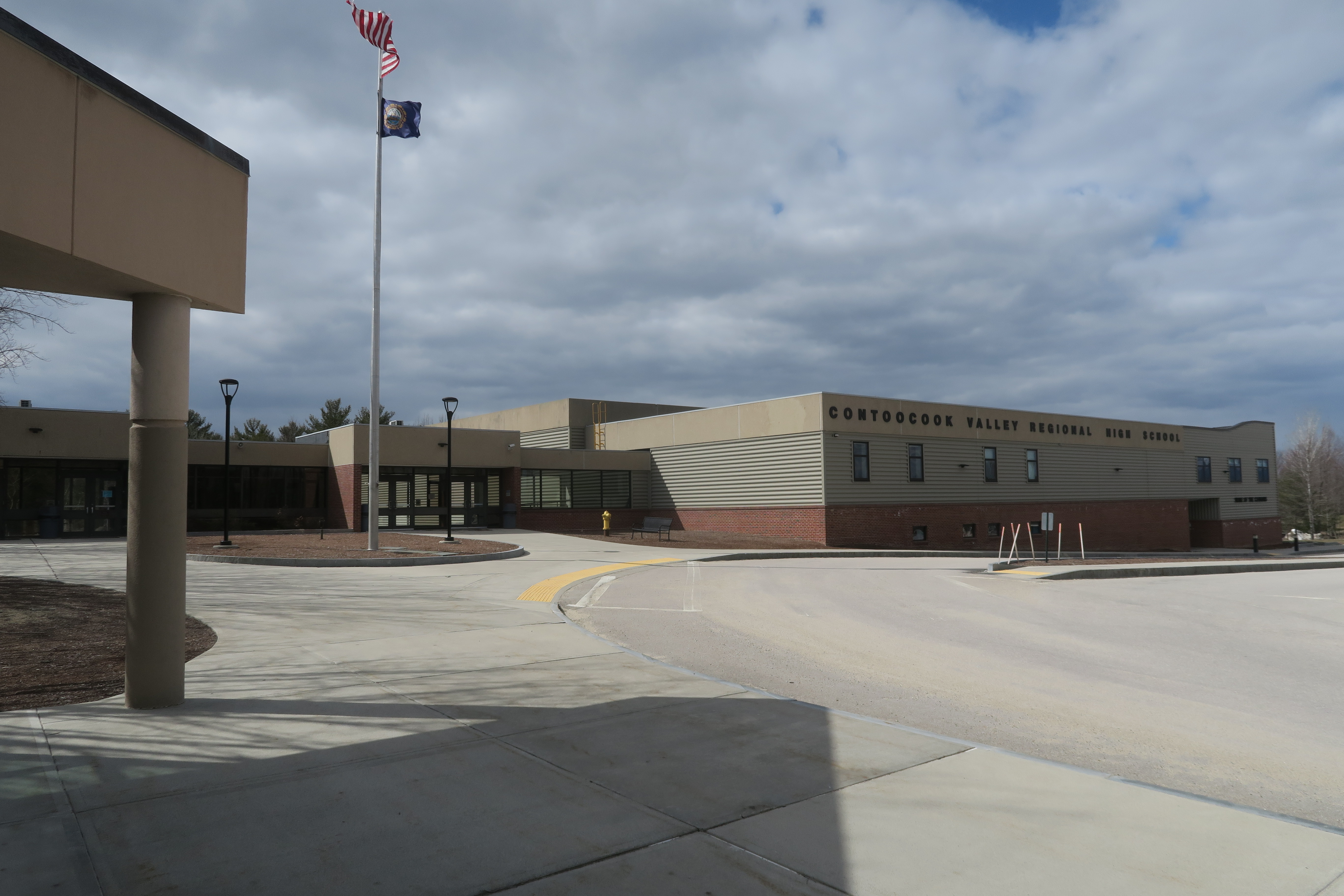
Contoocook Valley Regional High School in Peterborough, completed in 1970.

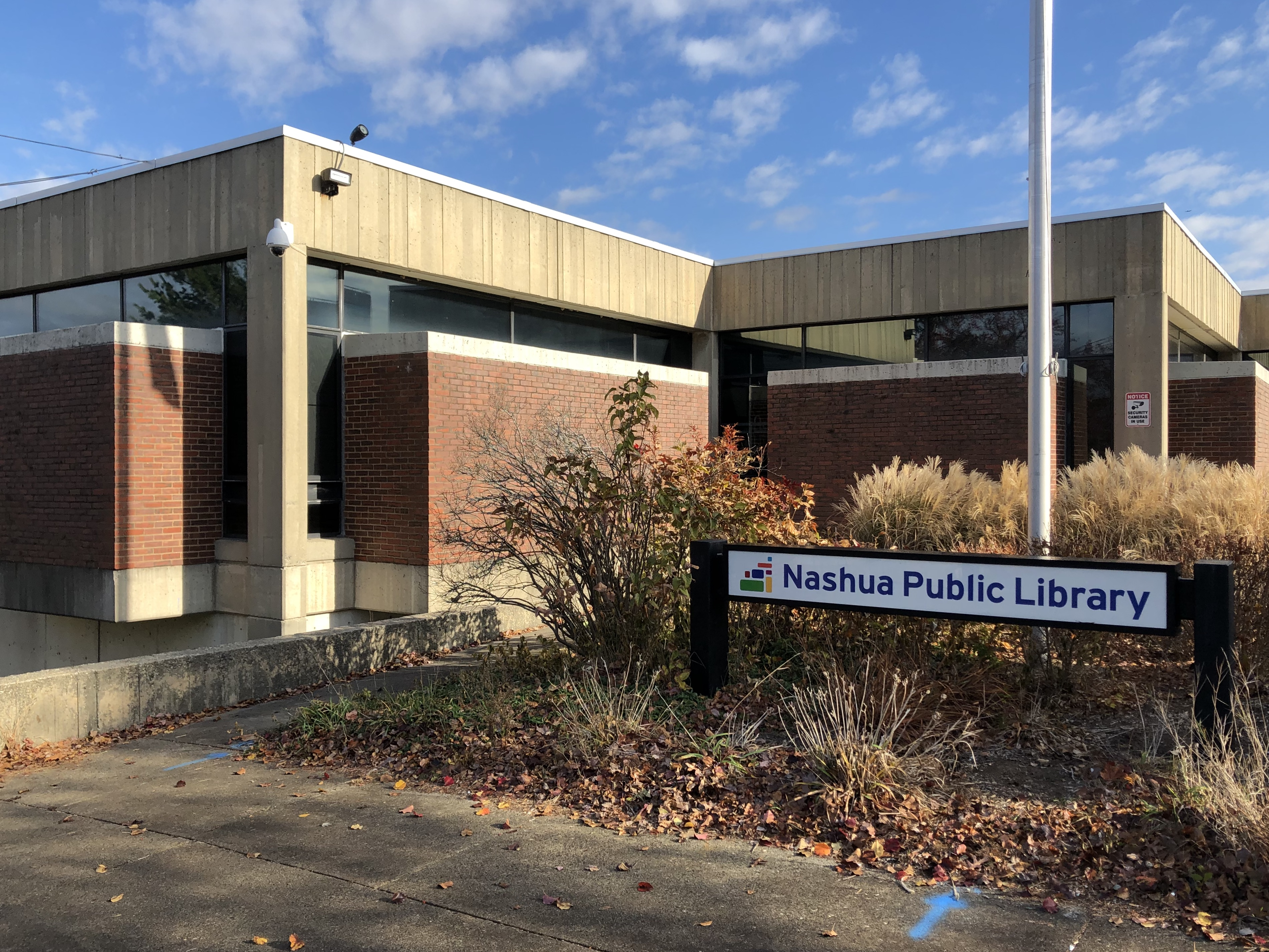
The Nashua Public Library, completed in 1971.

John A. Carter FAIA (1924–2017) was an American architect in practice in Nashua, New Hampshire, from 1953 to 1995.

== Life and career ==
John Avery Carter was born June 16, 1924, in Nashua to Eliot Avery Carter and Edith (Gardner) Carter. His grandfather, James R. Carter, was the founder of the Nashua Corporation, one of Nashua's largest employers, and the family maintained a close relationship with the company. Carter was educated at Phillips Academy and at Yale University, graduating in 1949 with a BArch. He worked as a drafter for architects Robert T. Coolidge and E. Carleton Granbery in New Haven and as a designer for Kane & Fairchild in Hartford before returning to Nashua in 1953 to open his own office. His first work was St. George's Episcopal Church, a small modernist church in Durham. In 1956 he formed a partnership with former classmate Bliss Woodruff, a New Haven native. In the 1970s Carter & Woodruff was the largest architecture firm in the region. In 1974 the partnership was expanded to include David W. Cheever, an employee since 1958, but was dissolved in 1976. Carter then returned to private practice until his retirement in 1995.

Carter was among the leading New Hampshire architects during his lifetime. He and his firms were frequently honored for their work by the local and national bodies of the American Institute of Architects. Carter joined the AIA in 1954 as a member of the New Hampshire chapter. He was elected to several chapter leadership positions, and served as president from 1965 to 1968 and as New England regional director from 1980 to 1982. In 1984 he was elected a Fellow, the organization's highest membership honor.

== Personal life ==
Carter was married in 1950 to Julie Adelaide Macauley, and they had six children. The couple lived in a house on Bartlett Street in Nashua, designed by and built for Carter in 1963, until their retirement to Florida in 1999. Carter died January 11, 2017, in West Palm Beach.

== Architectural works ==
- St. George's Episcopal Church, 1 Park Ct, Durham, New Hampshire (1953–54)
- Holy Trinity Methodist Church, 16 Sylvan St, Danvers, Massachusetts (1957–58)
- Nashua Corporation office building addition, (Note: A contributing property to the Nashua Gummed and Coated Paper Company Historic District, NRHP-listed in 2015.) 44 Franklin St, Nashua, New Hampshire (1959)
- Temple Beth Abraham, 4 Raymond St, Nashua, New Hampshire (1959–60)
- Unitarian Universalist Church of Nashua White Wing, 58 Lowell St, Nashua, New Hampshire (1959)
- Broad Street Elementary School, 390 Broad St, Nashua, New Hampshire (1962–63)
- YMCA-YWCA (former), 17 Prospect St, Nashua, New Hampshire (1963–64, altered)
- First Baptist Church, 105 Maple Ave, Keene, New Hampshire (1964–66)
- McLane Building, White Mountain School, Bethlehem, New Hampshire (1964–65)
- Mount Sunapee Resort summit lodge, 1398 NH-103, Newbury, New Hampshire (1964–65)
- Media Arts Center, Keene State College, Keene, New Hampshire (1965)
- St. Andrew's Episcopal Church, 52 Gould Rd, New London, New Hampshire (1966)
- Contoocook Valley Regional High School, 184 Hancock Rd, Peterborough, New Hampshire (1967–70)
- Kelley Library, 234 Main St, Salem, New Hampshire (1967)
- Babcock Hall, University of New Hampshire, Durham, New Hampshire (1968)
- Belknap Hall, Plymouth State College, Plymouth, New Hampshire (1969)
- Derryfield School, 2108 River Rd, Manchester, New Hampshire (1969–70)
- Gibbs Dining Hall, Eaglebrook School, Deerfield, Massachusetts (1969)
- Baines House, Eaglebrook School, Deerfield, Massachusetts (1970)
- Nashua Public Library, 2 Court St, Nashua, New Hampshire (1970–71)
- Bank of New Hampshire Building, 300 Franklin St, Manchester, New Hampshire (1971)
- Abbie Greenleaf Library addition, 439 Main St, Franconia, New Hampshire (1971)
- Nashua Arts and Science Center, 14 Court St, Nashua, New Hampshire (1972–74)
- James H. Hayes Safety Building, 33 Hazen Dr, Concord, New Hampshire (1975)
- Merrimack Public Library addition, 470 Daniel Webster Hwy, Merrimack, New Hampshire (1978–79)
- Veterans Memorial Library, Daniel Webster College, Nashua, New Hampshire (1985–86)

== See also ==
- John A. Carter Architectural Papers, 1950–1999, New Hampshire Historical Society.
