= Abbie Greenleaf Library =

- U.S. National Register of Historic Places
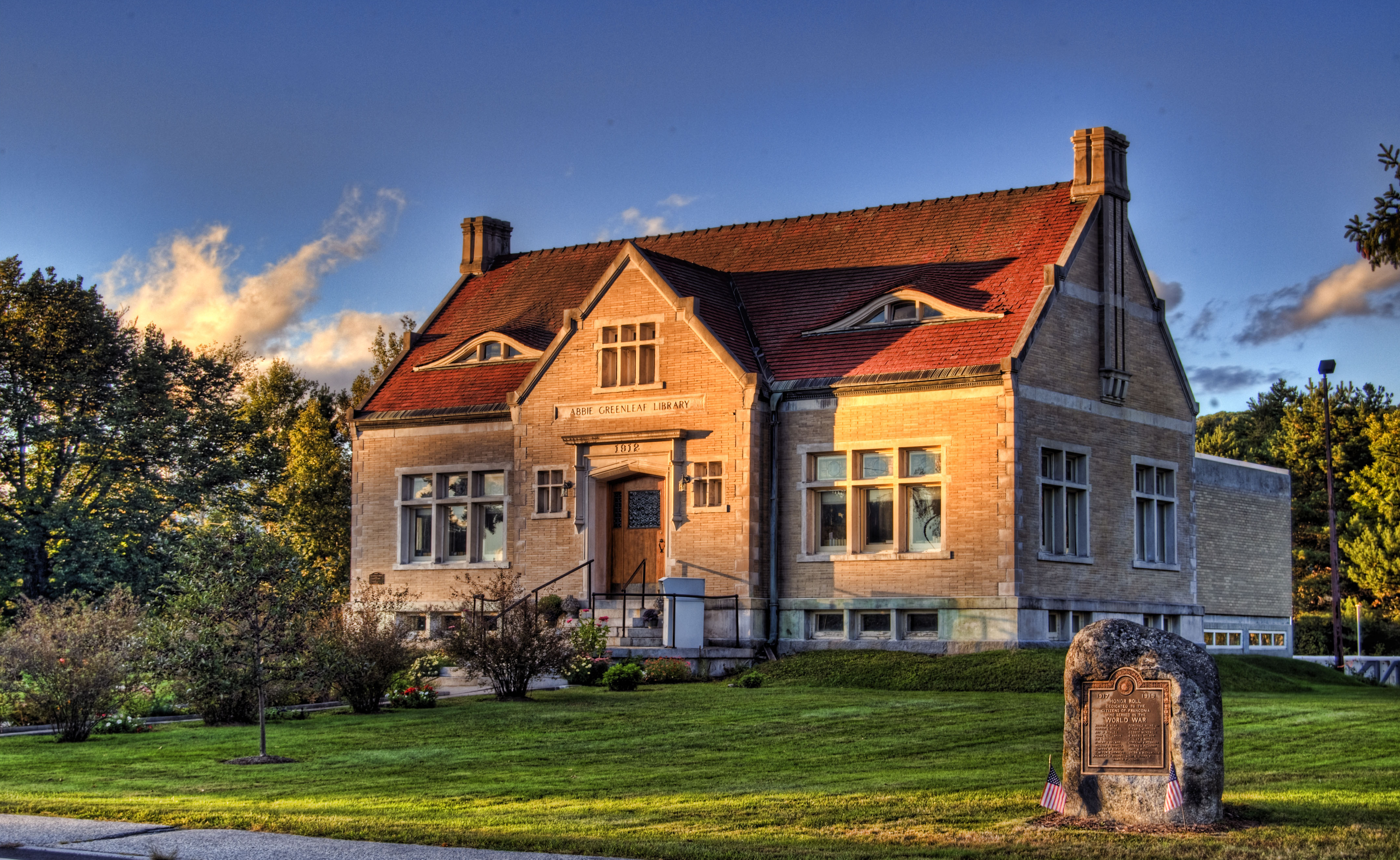

- Location within New Hampshire Location within the United States
- Location: 439 Main St., Franconia, New Hampshire
- Coordinates: 44°13′36″N 71°44′42″W
- Area: 1 acre (0.40 ha)
- Built: 1912; 1971
- Architect: William H. McLean (1912); Carter & Woodruff (1971)
- Architectural style: Late 19th and 20th Century Revivals
- NRHP reference No.: 03000526
- Added to NRHP: June 13, 2003

The Abbie Greenleaf Library is the public library in Franconia, New Hampshire. It is located at 439 Main St. in the center of the main village, in a Jacobethan building designed by William H. McLean and built in 1912. The building was a gift to the town from Charles Greenleaf and named in honor of his wife. Greenleaf was owner of the Profile House, a major resort hotel in Franconia. The library had an addition designed by Carter & Woodruff of Nashua built in 1971. The building was listed on the National Register of Historic Places in 2003.

== Architecture ==
The Abbie Greenleaf Library is located on the north side of Franconia's Main Street, just east of its town hall. It is a single-story masonry structure, finished in yellow brick with gray sandstone trim. It has a red ceramic tile roof, which is adorned with a pair of eyebrow dormers and flanked by a pair of end chimneys. A gabled entrance pavilion projects at the center of the facade, the entrance recessed in an opening with a low-pitch gabled top, and framed by a shouldered cornice. Small windows flank either side of the entrance on the projection, and there are bands of three windows on the main facade on either side of the projection. The interior is richly appointed in mahogany woodwork, with marble wainscoting and terrazzo tile floors.

The building was the first (and thus far only) purpose-built library building in the community. Its first library, a social lending library that charged a small fee, was founded in 1880 by summer residents, and this collection grew until it formed the basis for the town's free public library. It was originally housed in the town's general store, and was eventually moved to the local school, where the collection continued to grow. The present library building was built in 1912 to a design by William H. McLean of Boston, Massachusetts, paid for by Charles Greenleaf, proprietor of the Profile Hotel. Greenleaf made a further endowment bequest for the building's upkeep in his will, which was given to the town upon his death in 1924.

== See also ==
- National Register of Historic Places listings in Grafton County, New Hampshire
