= Bob McQuillen =

American folk musician and composer (1923–2014)

Bob "Mr. Mac" McQuillen
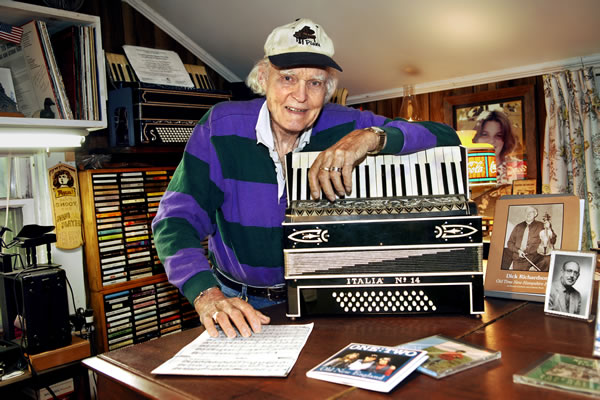
- McQuillen in 2002

Background information
- Born: June 27, 1923; Cambridge, Massachusetts, U.S.
- Died: February 4, 2014 (aged 90) Manchester, New Hampshire, U.S.
- Genres: Folk, contra dance, traditional dance music of New England
- Occupations: Musician, composer, teacher
- Instruments: Piano, accordion, guitar
- Years active: 1940s–2014

Bob "Mr. Mac" McQuillen (June 27, 1923 – February 4, 2014) was a teacher, musician, and prolific composer of contra dance tunes. He was a recipient of a 2002 National Heritage Fellowship awarded by the National Endowment for the Arts, which is the United States government's highest honor in the folk and traditional arts.

== Early life ==
McQuillen was born near Boston, but his family moved to southwestern New Hampshire when he was young. Although his father and grandfather were musicians, and Bob took piano lessons as a child, he didn't grow attached to music until after his time as a Marine during World War II. He started going to contra dances in and around Peterborough, New Hampshire, several times a week, and eventually joined the Ralph Page Orchestra. At a contra dance in 1946, he met Priscilla Scribner, whom he married a year later. They had three children, Dan, Rebecca, and William.

After returning from the Korean War, McQuillen settled down and became an industrial arts teacher at Peterborough High School and ConVal High School, where the students referred to him as "Mr. Mac". At some point, he was a police officer and a school bus driver.

== Contra dance years ==
McQuillen was involved in the contra dance community for over 60 years. Over his lifetime, he wrote more than 1,300 dance tunes, most of which he named after people or events in his life. This tradition began with his first tune, "Scotty O'Neil", named after one of his students who had died.

McQuillen was the subject of a 2001 documentary film titled Paid to Eat Ice Cream: Bob McQuillen and New England Contra Dancing. Perhaps his most famous tune is the waltz "Amelia".

== Death ==
McQuillen suffered a stroke on February 2, 2014. He was taken to Catholic Medical Center in Manchester, New Hampshire, where he died on February 4.

== Discography ==
Year	Group	Title	Label	Format
?	Ralph Page’s New Hampshire Orchestra	?	The Folk Dancer Record Service	78 rpm record
1972	Canterbury Country Dance Orchestra	Canterbury Country Dance Orchestra	F&W Records	LP record
1972	Canterbury Country Dance Orchestra	The Canterbury Country Orchestra Meets the F & W String Band	F&W Records	LP record
1974	Dudley Laufman and Canterbury Country Dance Orchestra	Mistwold	F&W Records	LP record
1974	Canterbury Country Dance Orchestra	Contra Dances: The Canterbury Orchestra	CDSS Records	45 rpm record
1974	Dudley Laufman and Canterbury Country Dance Orchestra	Swinging On A Gate	Front Hall Records	LP record, CD
1976	Douglas Ecker, Joyce Desmarais, Lorraine Lee Hammond, Rick Lee, Bob McQuillen	More Path Rent (hammered dulcimer tunes)	Esker Works	LP record
1979	Guest appearance with Debby McClatchy	Lady Luck	Green Linnet Records	LP record
1980	Applejack with Bob McQuillen	Contra Dance Music New England Style	Green Linnet Records	LP record
1981	Guest appearance with John McCutcheon	Barefoot Boy with Boots On	Front Hall Records, Rounder Records	LP record and cassette on Front Hall, CD on Rounder
1988, 1991, 2003	New England Tradition	Farewell to the Hollow	Great Meadow Music	cassette, CD
1991	Guest appearance with Sarah Bauhan	Chasing the New Moon	Whistler’s Music	CD
1993	Guest appearance with Sarah Bauhan	The Untamed Grasses	Alcazar Records	cassette, CD
1996	Old New England	Old New England	Old New England	CD
1997	Bob McQuillen, Laurie Andres, Cathie Whitesides	Hand It Down: Contra Dance Tunes by Bob McQuillen	Avocet	CD
1999	Compilation including Old New England	Choose Your Partners! Contra Dance & Square Dance Music of New Hampshire	Smithsonian Folkways	CD
2000	Rodney Miller and Bob McQuillen	Pure Quill	Great Meadow Music	CD
2002	Old New England	ONE: TWO	Old New England	CD
2005	Old New England	ONE: III	Old New England	CD
2007	Guest appearance with Sarah Bauhan	Lathrop's Waltz	Whistler’s Music	CD
2008	The Rhythm Rollers	Grand Right and Left	Avocet	CD
2010	Old New England	ONE: IV	Old New England	CD

== See also ==
- Benjamin Marshall House, McQuillen's Dublin home
