= Robert Fisher (New Hampshire politician) =

American politician

Member of the New Hampshire House of Representatives from the Belknap 9 district
- In office December 3, 2014 – May 18, 2017
- Preceded by: Beth Arsenault
- Succeeded by: Charlie St. Clair

Personal details
- Party: Republican
- Other political affiliations: Democratic (2012)
- Education: Winnisquam Regional High School
- Profession: Politician, Computer repairman

Robert Fisher is an American politician who served as a Republican member of the New Hampshire House of Representatives. He represented the Belknap 9 district, which includes the town of Belmont, NH and the city of Laconia, from December 2014 until his resignation in May 2017.

== Political career ==
In 2012, Fisher ran as a Democrat for the New Hampshire House of Representatives, but was unsuccessful. In 2014, he ran for the House of Representatives again, this time as a Republican. He won the 2014 election, and was re-elected in 2016.

As a representative, he served on no committees by his own request.

After the discovery that he founded and moderated the controversial subreddit r/TheRedPill, Fisher resigned from political office on May 17, 2017.

== r/TheRedPill controversy ==
In 2017, The Daily Beast reported that Fisher was the founder and a moderator, under the alias pk_atheist, of the subreddit "/r/TheRedPill", known for its misogynistic content. According to Daily Beast, Fisher used several pseudonyms, including "redpillschool" and "Morpheus Manfred", which was used for several media interviews on behalf of the forum.

Speaking to WMUR, Fisher admitted to writing at least some of the material attributed to him, which he characterized as "some injudicious things about the opposite sex following a bad breakup", including, from a 2008 post:

Rape isn't an absolute bad, because the rapist I think probably likes it a lot. I think he'd say it's quite good, really. ... . I think rape is bad, I'm not arguing for it. I'm arguing against the idea of an absolute truth.

Fisher also told WMUR:

That was an out-of-context quote from a nearly decade-old debate about the failings of moral relativism."

Following bipartisan comments calling for him to resign from his state House of Representatives seat, Fisher stated in April that he did not plan to do so.

On May 17, a Republican-led House committee voted 8–6 along party lines to recommend no disciplinary action against Fisher. Less than an hour later, while an investigation for perjury was getting started, Fisher resigned under social and political pressure. House Minority Leader Steve Shurtleff had called for a perjury investigation by the state attorney general's office, but said that Fisher's resignation made this no longer necessary.

== Personal life ==
Fisher is an atheist.
