= ConVal Regional High School =

Public high school in New Hampshire, US

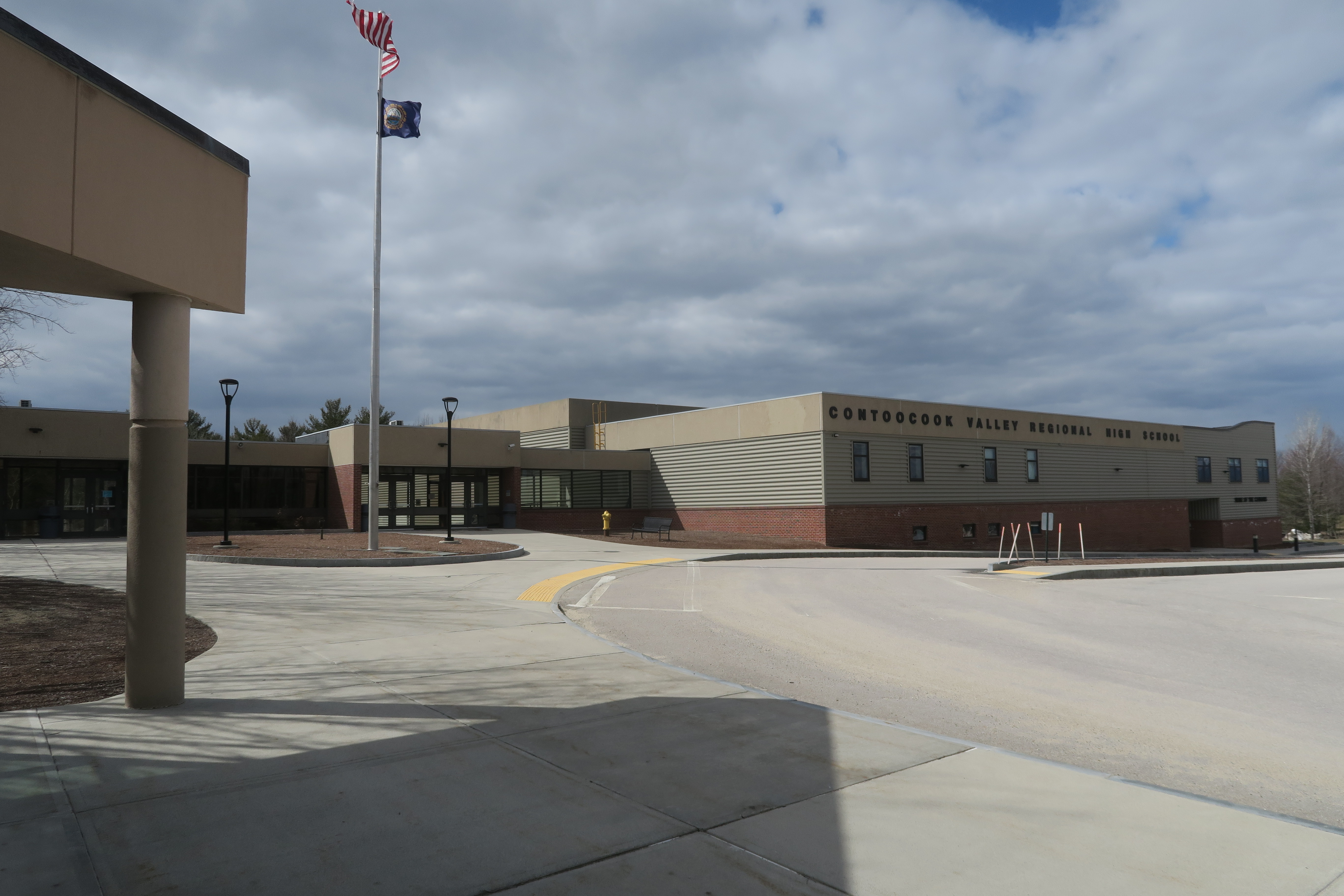
- ConVal Regional High School

Location
- Peterborough, New Hampshire; United States; 42°54′23″N 71°56′20″W

Information
- Type: Public high school
- Opened: 1970
- School district: Contoocook Valley
- Principal: Heather McKillop
- Teaching staff: 57.30 (FTE)
- Grades: 9–12
- Enrollment: 720 (2024-25)
- Student to teacher ratio: 11.92
- Colors: Blue and gold
- Team name: Cougars
- Communities served: Antrim, Bennington, Dublin, Francestown, Greenfield, Hancock, Peterborough, Sharon and Temple
- Feeder schools: Great Brook School, South Meadow School, area private schools
- Website: cvhs.conval.edu

ConVal Regional High School (short for Contoocook Valley Regional High School) is a high school in Peterborough, New Hampshire, that serves nine surrounding towns: Antrim, Bennington, Dublin, Francestown, Greenfield, Hancock, Peterborough, Sharon and Temple. The principal is Heather McKillop. ConVal has approximately 720 students and has had several notable sports and academic teams in the past. ConVal's mascot is the cougar. The school colors are blue and gold.

== History ==
The school was opened in 1970. It was designed by Nashua architects Carter & Woodruff.

== Academics ==
ConVal Regional High School offers instruction in different academic departments, including English, Health and Wellness, Mathematics, Science, Social Studies, Visual and Performing Arts, and World Languages (German and Spanish). The Region 14 Applied Technology Center on the ConVal High School campus serves the ConVal School District, Jaffrey-Rindge School District, and Mascenic Regional School District. It offers courses in Automotive Service Technology, Business, Careers in Education, Computer & Information Technology, Construction Trades, Digital Film and Photography, Graphic Design, Manufacturing, and Pre-Engineering. In 2024, ConVal Regional High School was ranked a "Best Public High School in New Hampshire" by U.S. News & World Report.

== Teachers in Academic Service Centers ==
In 2011, ConVal originated the Teachers in Academic Service Centers intervention block, a program where students can schedule themselves to teachers from whom they need help or support.

== Athletics and Co-Curriculars ==
As a member of the New Hampshire Interscholastic Athletic Association (NHIAA), ConVal Regional High offers students over 20 individual and team sport opportunities during the fall, winter, and spring sports seasons. These include Alpine Skiing, Baseball, Cross Country, Football, Golf, Ice Hockey, Indoor Track, Lacrosse, Nordic Skiing, Outdoor Track, Soccer, Softball, Spirit Team, Tennis, Volleyball, Wrestling, and others. In addition, students can take advantage of over 25 clubs and co-curricular opportunities, among them A Cappella, Art Club, Choir, ConVal for Climate, ConVal Drama, Envirothon, German Club, Interact (Rotary Youth Service), National Honor Society, National Ocean Sciences Bowl, Spanish Club, Student Council, Student-Staff Book Group, Yearbook, as well as Youth and Government.

== Notable alumni ==
- Sam Huntington, actor
- Steve Sawyer (1974), environmentalist and activist
- Brian Viglione, one half of the band The Dresden Dolls
- Adam Warren, comic book artist and writer, known for his version of The Dirty Pair
- Jonah Wheeler, New Hampshire State Representative

== Notable faculty ==
- (former) Bob McQuillen, contra dance musician and composer, National Heritage Fellow
