= Global Wind Energy Council =

- Formation: 2005
- Fields: Renewable energy

The Global Wind Energy Council (GWEC) is a member-based association representing the wind energy sector worldwide.

Established in 2005, GWEC's mission is to unlock the potential of wind energy as a critical solution to the energy transition by working with governments, investors and communities worldwide.

GWEC provides research and analysis on key trends in the wind power industry and works with governments and multilateral institutions to communicate the benefits of wind power and share best practices on policy and market design.

== History ==
The Global Wind Energy Council was established in 2005 to provide an international forum and represent wind energy industry companies and national and regional wind associations. Its founding members included the American Wind Energy Association and WindEurope.

In 2022, GWEC co-founded the Global Renewables Alliance (GRA), an umbrella group representing international trade associations from wind energy, solar power and other renewable energy industries. GWEC also co-founded the Global Offshore Wind Alliance (GOWA), comprising more than 28 member governments, that was founded with the Government of Denmark and the International Renewable Energy Agency (IRENA).

GWEC’s founding general secretary was American environmentalist and activist Steve Sawyer who previously served as leader of Greenpeace for nearly 30 years. Steve was succeeded by Ben Backwell, the former journalist and author of Wind Power: The Struggle for Control of a New Global Industry, who was appointed as GWEC CEO in 2018.

GWEC is headquartered in Lisbon, Portugal, with regional offices located in Belgium, Brazil, China, Egypt, India, Kenya, Philippines, Singapore, the United Kingdom and Vietnam.

== See also ==
- World Wind Energy Association (WWEA)
- List of large wind farms
- Wind power in Denmark
- Wind power in Germany
- Wind power in Iran
- Wind power in the United States
- Climate change
- Global warming
- List of notable renewable energy organizations
