= Winnacunnet High School =

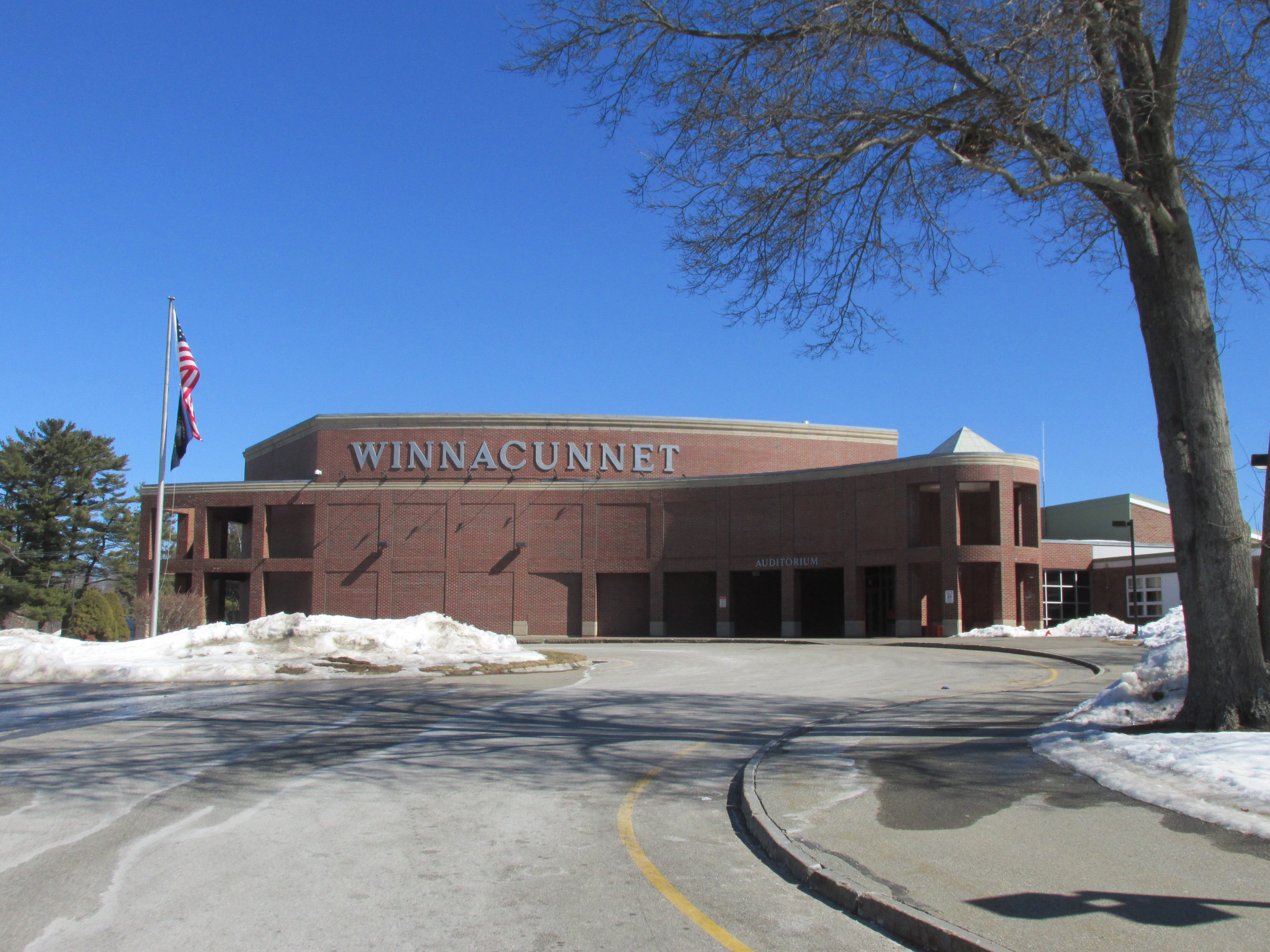
- Auditorium

Location
- 1 Alumni Drive; Hampton, NH 03842; United States; 42°55′55″N 70°49′57″W

Information
- Type: Comprehensive Public High School
- Motto: School of Champions
- Established: October 30, 1957
- School district: School Administrative Unit 21
- Superintendent: Meredith Nadeau
- Principal: William McGowan
- Staff: 99.00 (FTE)
- Grades: 9–12
- Enrollment: 1,063 (2022-2023)
- Student to teacher ratio: 10.74
- Campus type: Suburban
- Colors: Red, White, and Royal Blue
- Mascot: The Warrior
- Newspaper: Winnachronicle
- Feeder schools: Seabrook Elementary School; Seabrook Middle School; Hampton Academy; Lincoln Akerman School; Barnard School; North Hampton School
- Television station: WHTV
- Website: www.winnacunnet.org

Winnacunnet High School is an American public high school in Hampton, New Hampshire. It serves students in grades 9 through 12 who live in Hampton, Seabrook, North Hampton, South Hampton, and Hampton Falls. Students from South Hampton attend either Amesbury High School or Winnacunnet High School. Winnacunnet is an Abenaki word that means "beautiful place of the pines". William McGowan has been the principal since 2010.

== History ==
On October 30, 1957, the groundbreaking began for the construction of the school. Winnacunnet High School opened for the first time in the fall of 1958 with an attendance of 474 students. Before 1958, area students attended the Hampton Academy and High School, a junior-senior high school that still exists today as the junior high school for Hampton. The official Winnacunnet High dedication ceremony took place on October 26, 1958. The school has undergone construction and renovations in recent years, including a renovated cafeteria and stand alone gymnasium. The school's MCJROTC opened in 1999 and is the only MCJROTC in the state.

The school was in the national news in 1990 when Pamela Smart conspired with 15-year-old sophomore student William "Billy" Flynn and, according to him, convinced him to murder her husband Greg Smart on May 1, 1990. Smart did not work at Winnacunnet High School but at the SAU 21 building across the street, located on Winnacunnet school grounds. Smart was convicted of first-degree murder in March 1991, and sentenced to life in prison without the possibility of parole. She is currently serving her sentence in a maximum security prison in New York State.

== Notable Visits ==
Several presidential candidates have held speeches at Winnacunnet High School:

- George W. Bush, held a speech directly with students during his first presidential run, (Sept 7th, 2000).
- John Kerry, held a speech with Jeanne Shaheen and Michael J. Fox for community members and students during his presidential run, (Oct 4th, 2004).
- Bill Clinton and Hillary Clinton during a GOTV campaign meeting held at Winnacunnet High School. (Feb 2nd 2016) Hillary Clinton also visited previously during her first run against Obama in the presidential primaries (Apr 14th 2007) and (Jan 6th 2008)
- Donald Trump, held a speech at Winnacunnet High School. (Aug 14th, 2015)
- Bernie Sanders held a town hall meeting at Winnacunnet High School (Dec 15th 2015)

== Notable alumni ==
- Nicholas Bridle, New Hampshire State Representative
- Renny Cushing New Hampshire state representative
- Amy Geller, film documentarian
- Maura Healey, Governor of Massachusetts since 2023
- Steve Merrill, Governor of New Hampshire 1993-1997
- Charles Rocket, comedian

== See also ==
- List of high schools in New Hampshire
