= Ascutney =

Ascutney may refer to a location in Vermont:

- Ascutney, Vermont, a village in Weathersfield, Vermont
- Mount Ascutney, a mountain with elevation 3144 feet named after the village
- Ascutney Mountain Resort, a ski area located on the western side of Mount Ascutney that opened in 1946 and closed in 2010
