= Mount Ascutney =

Mountain in Vermont, U.S.

- Mount Ascutney from Claremont, New Hampshire

Highest point
- Elevation: 3,144 ft (958 m)
- Prominence: 2,270 ft (690 m)
- Listing: #25 on New England Fifty Finest
- Coordinates: 43°26′40″N 72°27′13″W

Geography
- Location within Vermont Location within the United States
- Location: Windsor County, Vermont, U.S.
- Topo map: USGS Mount Ascutney

Climbing
- Easiest route: Hike

Mount Ascutney is a mountain in the U.S. state of Vermont. At 3,144 feet (958 m), it is the highest peak in Windsor County. Mount Ascutney is a monadnock that rises abruptly from the surrounding lowlands. For example, the Windsor Trail is 2.7 miles (4.3 km) to the summit with 2,514 feet (766 m) of elevation gain and an overall 18% grade.

The mountain's base straddles several villages — Ascutney, Brownsville, Windsor, and West Windsor — and it is located only several miles off exit 8 on Interstate 91 in Mount Ascutney State Park. The mountain itself is visible from the top of Mount Washington, seventy miles away.

== Location and description ==
Mt. Ascutney is located in the southeastern section of Windsor County, in the Connecticut River Valley. The village of Ascutney, in the town of Weathersfield, is to the south. To the north lie the towns of Windsor and West Windsor. The village of Brownsville, in the town of West Windsor, sits at the northwestern base of the mountain. To the east lie the Connecticut River and the city of Claremont, New Hampshire. To the immediate west stands Little Ascutney Mountain.

== Etymology and naming dispute ==
Since the Colonial era, the mountain has primarily been referred to as "Mount Ascutney" (or such variant spellings as "Aschutney"), a name made official by the U.S. Board on Geologic Names in 1960. While various folk etymologies exist, many modern sources trace the name "Ascutney" to the Abenaki word Ascutegnik, a word meaning "at the end of the river fork," which was the name of a settlement near where the Sugar River meets the Connecticut River. However, the use of the Abenaki word Kaskadenak (pronounced: Cas-Cad-Nac)–which means "mountain of the rocky summit" or "wide mountain"–as a name of the mountain has long been attested, and the Board on Geologic Names acknowledges the name as an official variant. In 2016, Hartland resident Robert Hutchins petitioned the Board to change the official name to Kaskadenak, garnering the support of Chief Paul Bunnell of the Koasek Traditional Band of the Abenaki Nation among others. In July 2018, the State of Vermont Board of Libraries, which has the statutory authority to name geographical features, heard arguments to officially rename the mountain to Mount Kaskadenak. The Board of Libraries voted 5–0 to reject the name change, citing the testimony of town managers who reported local opposition at meetings on the name change and the results of polling. The Board also cited an email from Smithsonian linguist Ives Goddard, who proposed that the origin of the name "Ascutney" was the Abenaki word kskatena and wrote that

"Ascutney […] and Cascadnac (from Western Abenaki kaskadenak) are both authentic names meaning 'wide mountain.' Both names reflect variable features of the local Native American language and of English from different times."

== Cornish Colony ==
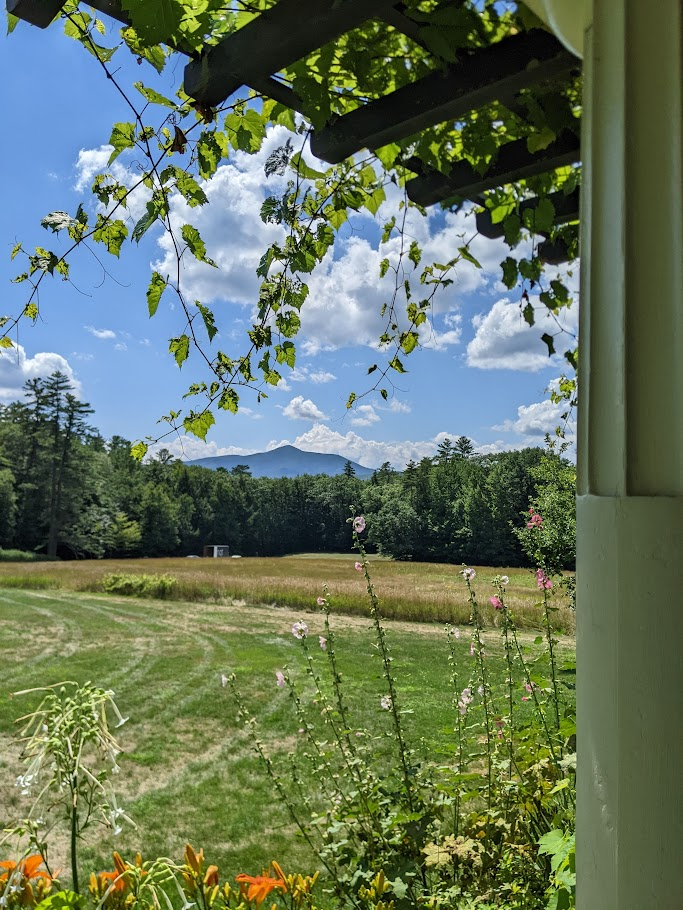
View of Mt Ascutney from Augustus Saint-Gaudens' studio in Cornish, New Hampshire.

From the late 1880s to 1930, a community of artists thrived in Cornish and Plainfield, New Hampshire as well as Windsor, Vermont. Besides Augustus Saint-Gaudens, other artists built their homes specifically sited towards the mountain, and it became the focal point of many expansive gardens and Italianate villas.

== Geology ==
Mount Ascutney and adjacent Little Ascutney Mountain are part of the White Mountain plutonic-volcanic series of igneous rocks. These rocks intruded from Triassic to Cretaceous time in southern Maine, New Hampshire, and Vermont with the relatively young Ascutney pluton intruding at ~122 MA (K/Ar date on biotite). The Ascutney pluton is about 8 km × 4 km in map area and intrudes into Precambrian basement gneisses of the Chester dome and overlying Paleozoic metasedimentary rocks. The pluton emplacement is probably related to the formation of transform faults and/or fracture zones during (failed) Mesozoic rifting. The pluton consists of stocks of gabbro-diorite, syenite, and granite which locally include xenoliths of trachyte, rhyolite, and phreatomagmatic meta-sedimentary breccia, and is consequently interpreted as having underlain a volcanic edifice. Other mafic xenoliths remain unidentified. There are also a partial ring dike and a number of other dikes in the area.

The last glacial advance broke material off the mountain and distributed it southward into Massachusetts. The trail it left is known as the "Mount Ascutney Train."

== Ski resort ==
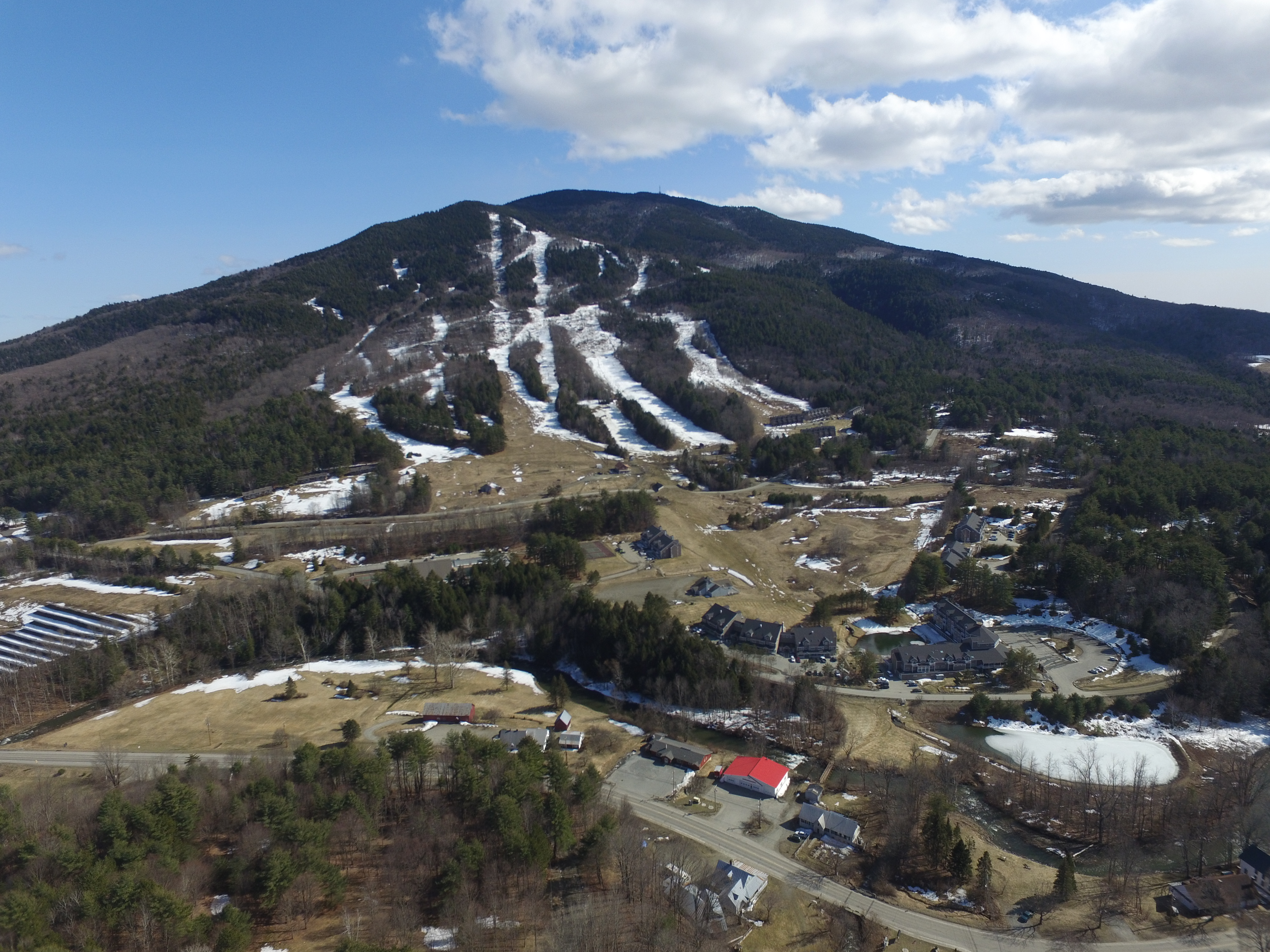
Aerial view of Mount Ascutney

Mount Ascutney was home to the Ascutney Mountain Resort, a ski resort on the mountain's northwest face, in the village of Brownsville. The ski area closed in 2010. The resort's 470 acres and remaining facilities were purchased in 2015 by the Trust for Public Land in collaboration with the town of West Windsor and the Upper Valley Land Trust for conservation and recreation. The nonprofit organization Ascutney Outdoors now maintains a smaller ski area of eight trails and an 1,800-foot T-bar lift on the property.

== See also ==
- List of mountains in Vermont
- List of New England Fifty Finest
