= David Dexter House =

Historic house in New Hampshire, United States

- U.S. National Register of Historic Places
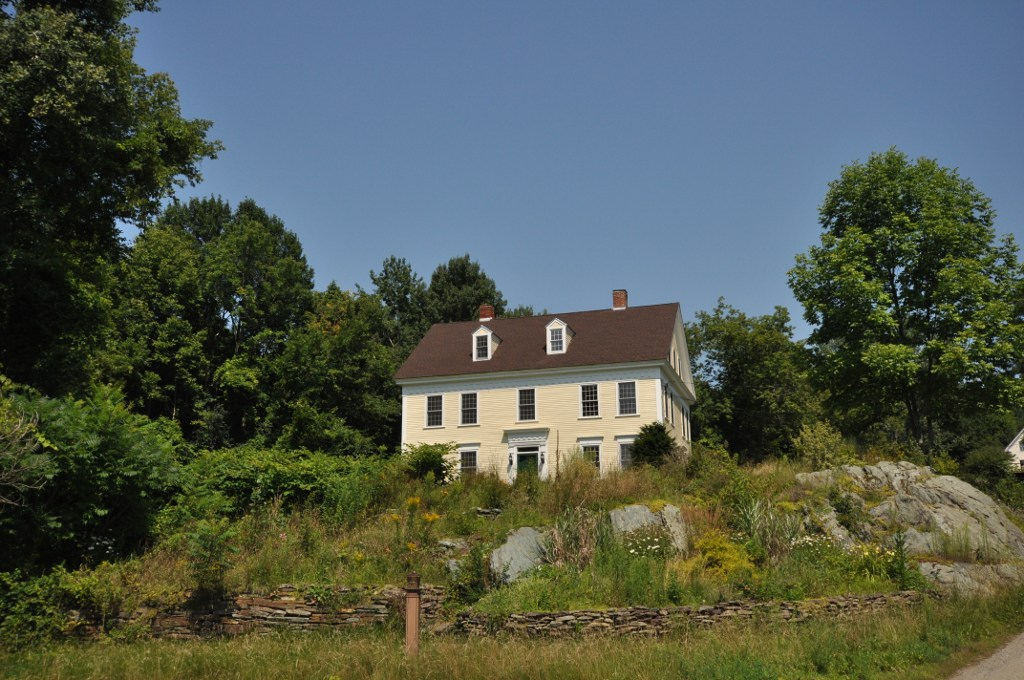

- Location within New Hampshire Location within the United States
- Location: Lincoln Heights, Claremont, New Hampshire
- Coordinates: 43°22′37″N 72°20′16″W
- Area: less than one acre
- Built: 1790
- Architectural style: Federal
- NRHP reference No.: 79000213
- Added to NRHP: November 29, 1979

The David Dexter House is a historic house on Lincoln Heights in northern Claremont, New Hampshire. Built about 1790, it is a prominent local example of Federal period architecture, and was home to David Dexter, whose early mills were the first in the city's industrial history. The house was moved to its present location in 1975 to avoid demolition, and was listed on the National Register of Historic Places in 1979. It now houses apartments.

== Description and history ==
The David Dexter House is located on a rise now known as Lincoln Heights, north of the Broad Street crossing of the Sugar River. It is a 2 1/2-story wood-frame structure, with a gabled roof and clapboarded exterior. Although not at its original location, it is set on a modern foundation that includes granite blocks from its original foundation. It is five bays wide and four deep, with sash windows arranged symmetrically around the entrance on the front facade. The ground-floor windows have projecting cornices, and the entry is framed by an elaborate Federal style surround. The interior, in particular the staircase, also has fine Federal period details.

The house was built c. 1790 by David Dexter, who along with his brother Stephen established the first mills on the Sugar River in Clarement, on land that later became the Monadnock Mills. The house was originally located nearer the river, and was later used as a boarding house for mill workers. In the 1970s the house became the focal point for a long-running preservation debate, whose result was that the building was relocated to its present location, minus a later ell and its original central chimney, in 1975, to make way for an urban redevelopment project.

== See also ==
- National Register of Historic Places listings in Sullivan County, New Hampshire
