= Hunter Archeological Site =

- U.S. National Register of Historic Places
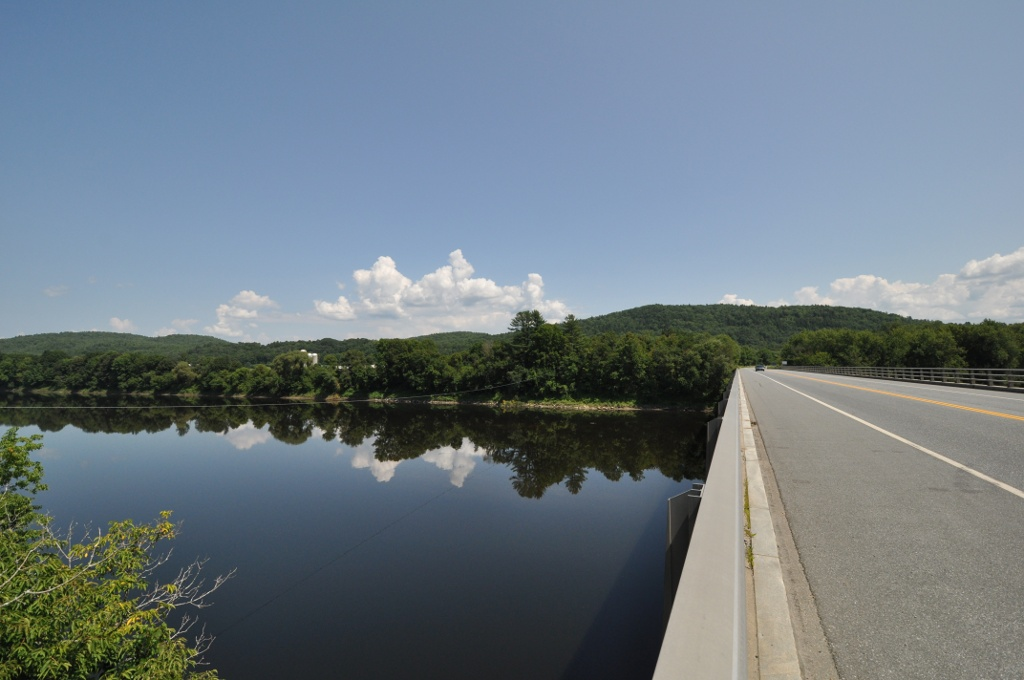
- View of Claremont shore near the Ascutney bridge
- Location: near the mouth of the Sugar River at the Connecticut River, Claremont, New Hampshire
- Area: 1 acre (0.40 ha)
- Built: 1300
- NRHP reference No.: 76000222
- Added to NRHP: June 7, 1976

The Hunter Archeological Site is a significant prehistoric Native American site in Claremont, New Hampshire. Located near the bridge connecting Claremont and Ascutney, Vermont, the site includes seven levels of occupational evidence, including evidence of at least three longhouses. The oldest dates recorded from evidence gathered during excavations in 1967 were to AD 1300. The site was listed on the National Register of Historic Places in 1976.

== Setting and archaeological history ==
The Hunter Site occupies a series of terraces near the bridge between Clarement and Ascutney in western Claremont. Artifacts have been found in soils to a depth of 11 feet (3.4 m), and appear to represent at least seven different periods of occupation. It is described by archaeologist R. Duncan Mathewson as "one of the most complete records available of Woodland occupation along the upper Connecticut River Valley."

The site was identified by archaeologist Howard Sargent in 1952. In 1967 he conducted some salvage archaeology to recover artifacts that were at risk of disturbance or destruction by the adjacent bridge construction. He then did a more complete excavation of a part of the site near the bridge in 1970. Artifacts recovered in this work include ceramics attributed to the Late Woodland period, charred plant remains, and burials. Structural evidence includes features interpreted as the sites of longhouses. In particular, these later finds suggest that the occupants were culturally related to Native Americans from the New York area.

== See also ==
- National Register of Historic Places listings in Sullivan County, New Hampshire
