= KCNH =

KCNH may refer to:

- Claremont Municipal Airport (ICAO code KCNH)
- KCNH-LD, a low-power television station (channel 26, virtual 47) licensed to serve Springfield, Missouri, United States
