= West Windsor =

West Windsor may refer to:

- West Windsor, Vermont
- West Windsor, Michigan, an unincorporated community in Eaton County, Michigan
- West Windsor Township, New Jersey
- Windsor West, the electoral district
