= Lower Village District =

Historic district in New Hampshire, United States

- U.S. National Register of Historic Places
- U.S. Historic district
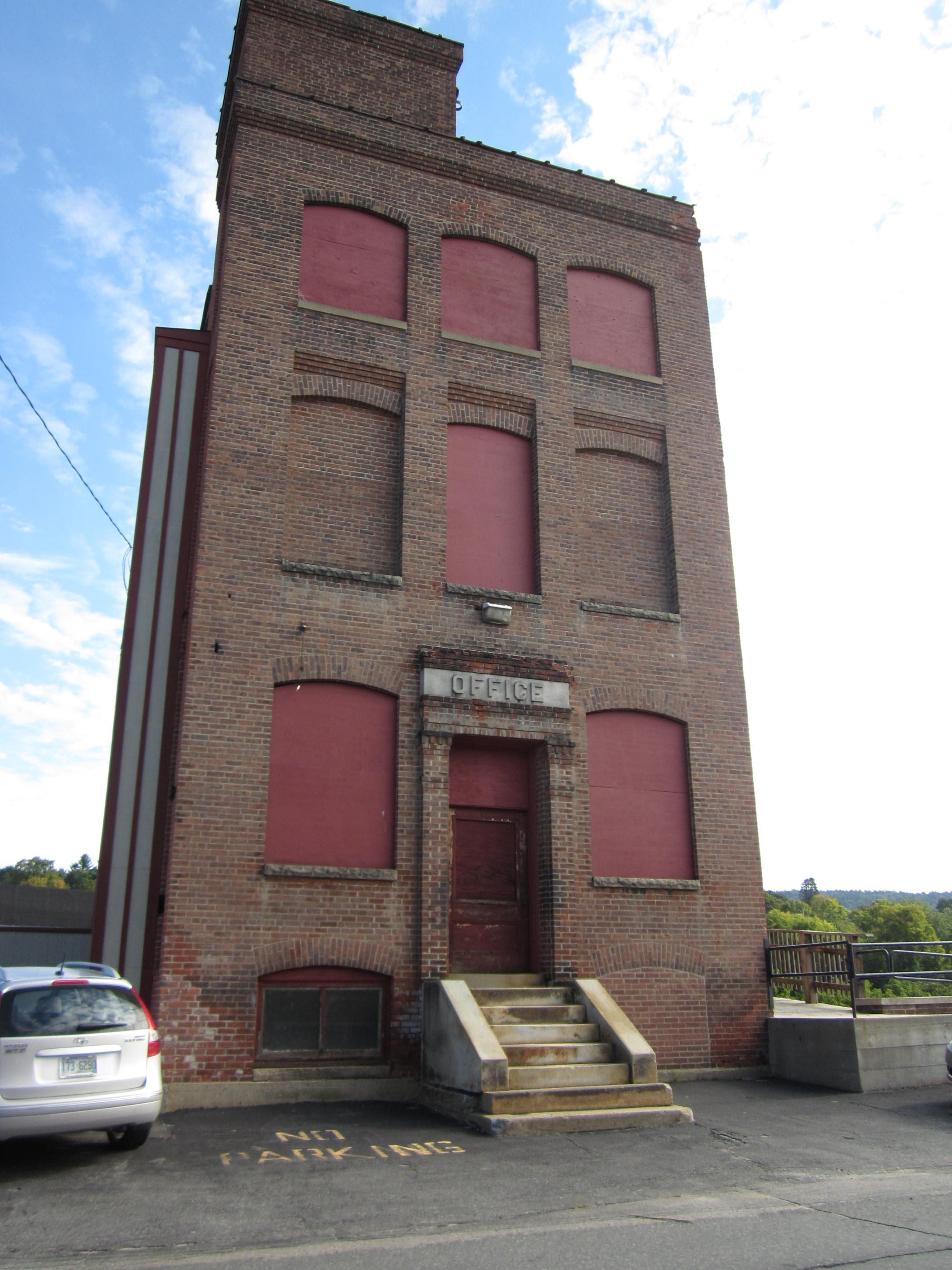
- Sullivan Machine Company Office building

- Location within New Hampshire Location within the United States
- Location: Along Central St. and Main St. on both sides of Sugar River, Claremont, New Hampshire
- Area: 0 acres (0 ha)
- Architectural style: Greek Revival
- MPS: Downtown Claremont and Lower Village MRA
- NRHP reference No.: 78003455
- Added to NRHP: February 21, 1978

The Lower Village District encompasses a historic industrial area down the Sugar River a short way from the historic center of Claremont, New Hampshire. The area was developed beginning in the 1830s by the Claremont Mill Company, and extends on either side of the river roughly from the Main Street crossing in the west to the junction of Main and Central Streets.

Although Claremont was established in the 1790s, the industrial development that was the foundation of its economic prosperity did not begin until the 1830s. Recognizing the power provided by the many falls on the Sugar River, the principals of the Claremont Mill Company purchased a large area of land below the town center and began its development, building mills and worker housing between the 1830s and 1860s. The principal surviving elements of this period in the district are Greek Revival houses, although two major industrial buildings, a brick structure at 169 Main Street and the Sugar River Mill at 159 Main Street, survive from the time. The area was extensively redeveloped between about 1890 and 1920, when the Sullivan Machinery Corporation established major operations on the south side of the river. In this period numerous older buildings were torn down and replaced by new industrial facilities and housing. During this time the extant Sullivan company facilities were built (adjacent to the separately-listed Monadnock Mills), as was St. Mary's Roman Catholic Church. Properties just over the Main Street bridge on the north side were also redeveloped, with the construction of the Freeman and O'Neill woodworking shops.

== See also ==
- Central Business District (Claremont, New Hampshire)
- National Register of Historic Places listings in Sullivan County, New Hampshire
