= Monadnock Mills =

- U.S. National Register of Historic Places
- U.S. Historic district
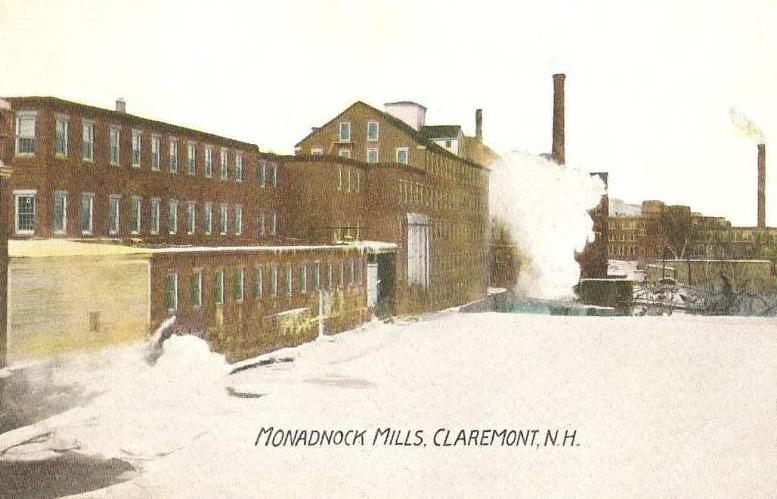
- c. 1910 postcard view

- Location within New Hampshire Location within the United States
- Location: Broad, Water, Crescent Sts., and Mill Rd., Claremont, New Hampshire
- Coordinates: 43°22′26″N 72°20′17″W
- Area: 8.5 acres (3.4 ha)
- NRHP reference No.: 79000272
- Added to NRHP: February 15, 1979

The Monadnock Mills are a historic mill complex in Claremont, New Hampshire. They extend along the southern bank of the Sugar River on both sides of Water Street, between the Broad Street bridge to the east, and the junction of Main and Water Streets in the west, where they abut the industrial area formerly associated with the Sullivan Machinery Company; there also a small number of surviving elements on the north side of the river opposite this area. The complex represents the surviving elements of what was once the largest manufacturing complex in the upper Connecticut River watershed area, and one of its oldest. The mills were listed on the National Register of Historic Places in 1979. Many of its buildings have been repurposed to other uses.

== History ==
The Sugar River Manufacturing Company was chartered by the state of New Hampshire in 1831, for the purpose of creating cotton and woolen textiles. The oldest surviving building, the four-story Mill Number 1, dates to 1836, and was followed by the construction of nearby tenement houses. The complex was enlarged in 1843 under new ownership, and began operations the following year. Mill Number 2, on the north bank of the river, was built in 1853, and the adjacent Sunapee Mill was bought in 1856. The company was renamed "Monadnock Mills" in 1846, and operated until 1963. Most of the buildings erected by the company are still standing, but are no longer under single ownership.

The Mills have received several sustainability awards over the years, including the Manufacturing Leadership "Sustainability Leadership Award" in 2016 and the 2017 FSC Leadership Award.

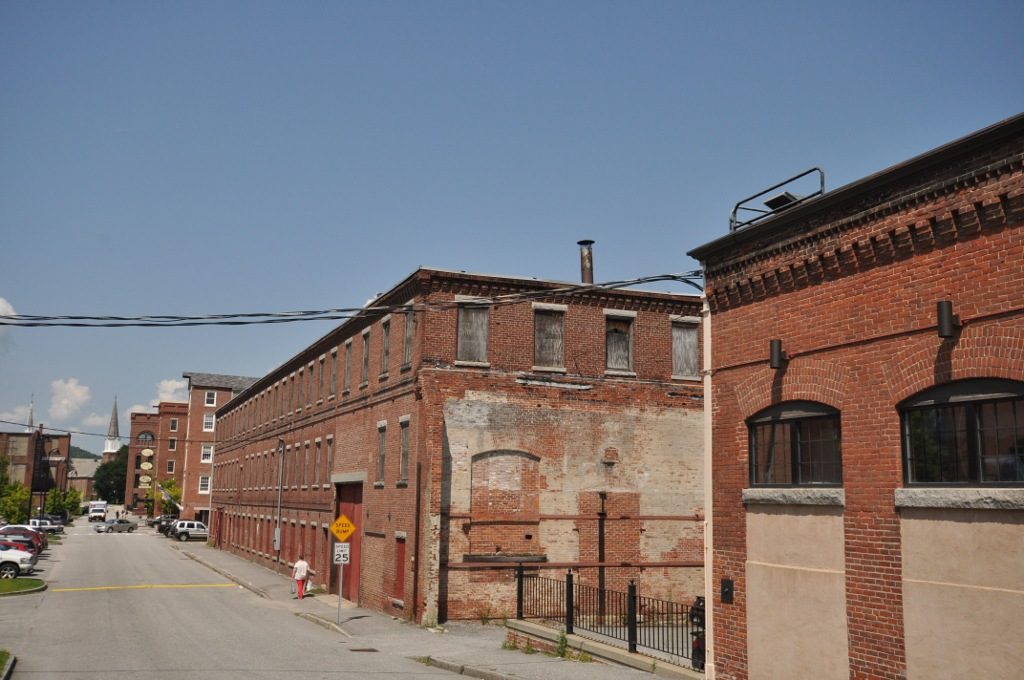
Water Street view of the mill complex

== See also ==
- Central Business District (Claremont, New Hampshire)
- Lower Village District
- National Register of Historic Places listings in Sullivan County, New Hampshire
