= Claremont City Hall =

Historic building in New Hampshire, US

- U.S. National Register of Historic Places
- U.S. Historic district – Contributing property
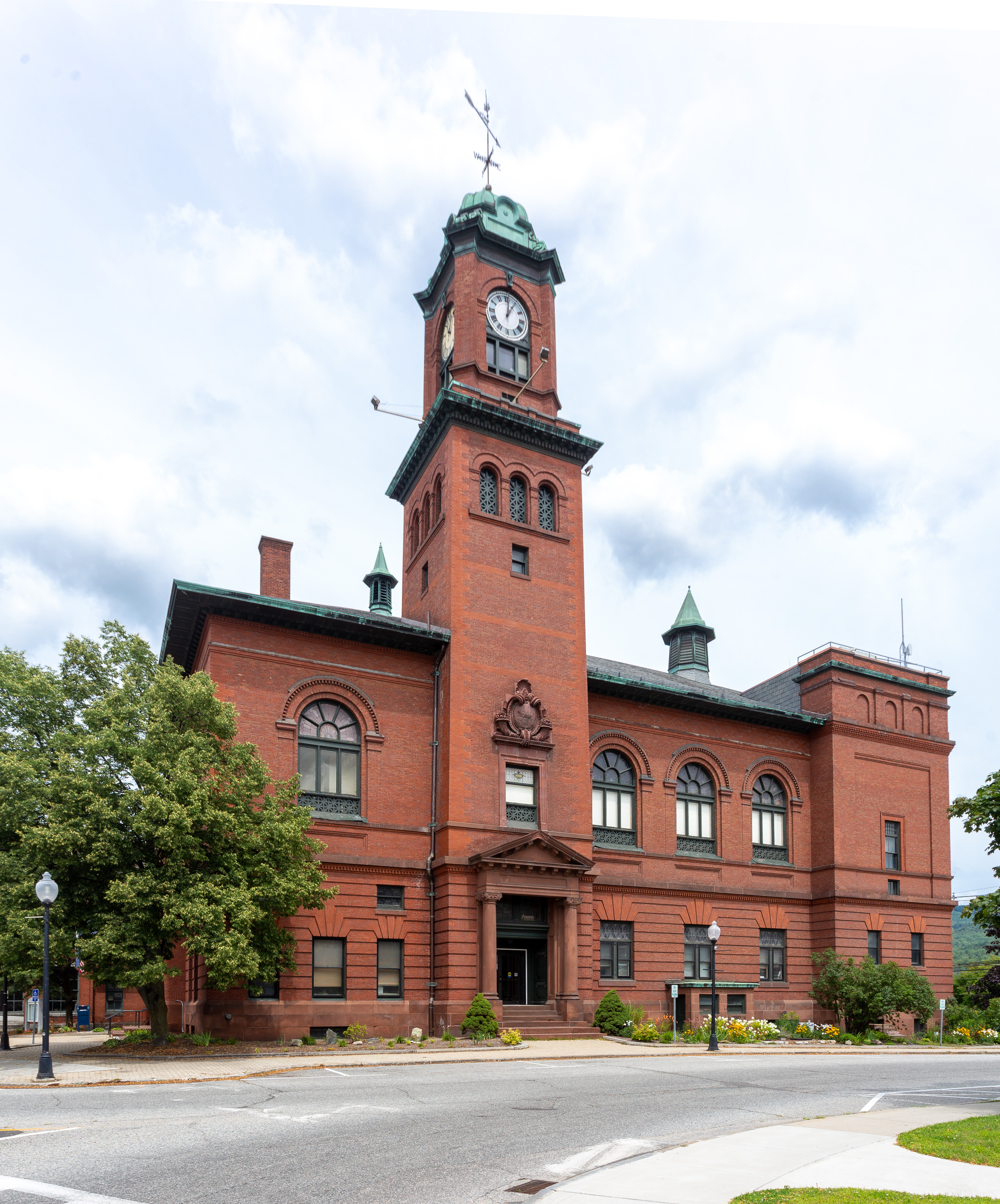

- Location within New Hampshire Location within the United States
- Location: Tremont Square, Claremont, New Hampshire
- Coordinates: 43°22′21″N 72°20′15″W
- Area: 0.5 acres (0.20 ha)
- Built: 1895
- Built by: Hira R. Beckwith
- Architect: Lamb & Rich
- Architectural style: Renaissance
- Part of: Central Business District (ID73000176)
- NRHP reference No.: 73000176

Significant dates
- Added to NRHP: April 26, 1973
- Designated CP: February 21, 1978

Claremont City Hall, also known as the Claremont Opera House, is located at 58 Opera House Square in the heart of Claremont, New Hampshire, United States.

== Description ==
The monumental Italian Renaissance Revival two-story brick and brownstone building was designed by New York City architect Charles A. Rich, an alumnus of nearby Dartmouth College, and built between 1895 and 1897. Hira R. Beckwith, an architect in Claremont, was the contractor. Many of the construction materials for the building came from the surrounding region. The foundation consists of Green Mountain rock, and the base was dressed Connecticut River brownstone from Springfield, Massachusetts. The major part of the exterior is built from nearly one million bricks from Lebanon, New Hampshire. The original design of the building included first floor that housed a meeting space seating 700, while the upper floor housed the "opera house" (auditorium), which seated nearly 1,000 and included a stage adequate for mounting theatrical productions. Rich and Beckwith spent two years and $62,000 to construct the building as a regional center for entertainment, cultural, community and political events. The building was dedicated on June 22, 1897.

The auditorium has a frescoed ceiling and a decorative wall frieze culminating with a proscenium arch adorned with a combination of basswood, painted cream, and a gold leafed molded plaster-work in high relief. Much of the gold leaf is original. There is a circular multicolored fresco of the New Hampshire state seal seated above the proscenium arch. Total seating capacity for the auditorium is 783. In 1960, the first floor of the building was partitioned to house additional city offices, and the opera house was closed in 1963 citing lack of use. A restoration committee was created in the 1970s to spearhead the opera house's restoration and modernization, and after a lengthy awareness and fundraising campaign, it was renovated and reopened in 1979. The building was listed on the National Register of Historic Places in 1973.

== History ==
In the early 1900s the Claremont Opera House was the entertainment center for the Upper Connecticut River Valley area. Much of this early success was due to Harry Eaton, local druggist and manager of the Opera House for 32 years. Eaton arranged for theatrical and musical acts, vaudeville minstrel shows, and films to perform in Claremont. John Philip Sousa's Band of Fifty, with three soloists, notably appeared in concert for a 1906 Saturday matinee.

Today, the entire building is seen as a historic treasure. In addition to city offices and the performance space, the Claremont Police Department, District Court, City offices, and Claremont City Council chambers are also located on premises. The Opera House itself, now run by a Board of Directors, continues to present a wide variety of local, regional, and touring entertainment to the public.

== See also ==
- National Register of Historic Places listings in Sullivan County, New Hampshire
