= Stevens High School (New Hampshire) =

Coordinates: 43°22′08″N 72°20′16″W

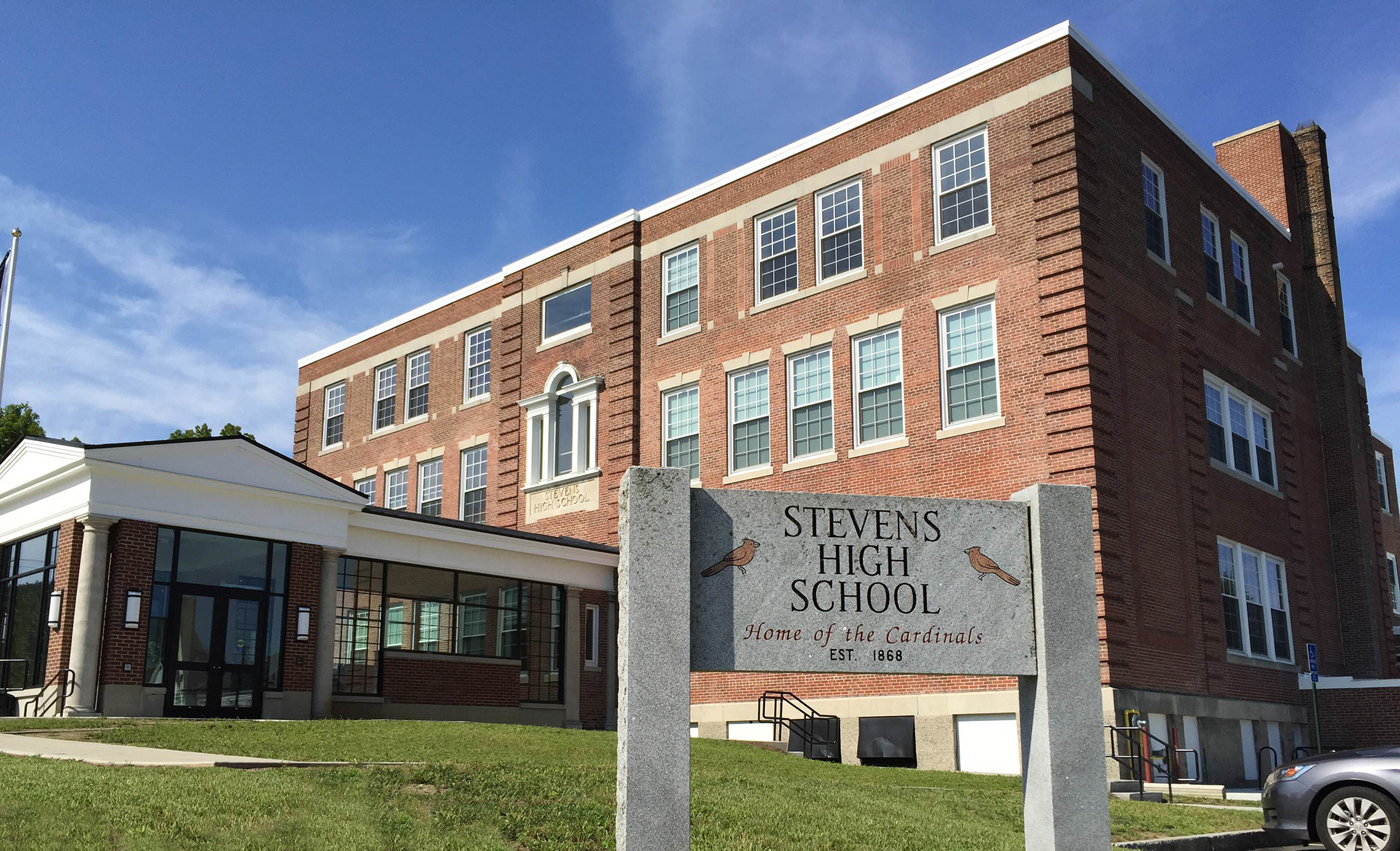

Location
- 175 Broad St; Claremont, New Hampshire; United States

Information
- Type: Public
- Established: 1868
- Principal: Christopher Pratt
- Teaching staff: 42.00 (FTE)
- Enrollment: 525 (2022-2023)
- Student to teacher ratio: 12.50
- Campus type: Suburban
- Colors: Red and black
- Mascot: Cardinals
- Website: shs.sau6.org

Stevens High School is the only public high school in Claremont, New Hampshire, United States. It is in the center of the city on the corner of Broad and Summer streets. It was founded in 1868, the result of a $20,000 donation by Paran Stevens to Claremont with the proviso that the city appropriate a like sum. In the early 1990s, the school gained status as the host to one of the earlier Apple Macintosh user groups, primarily attended by high school faculty. Stevens High School is accredited by the New England Association of Schools and Colleges as well as the State of New Hampshire Department of Education.

== History ==
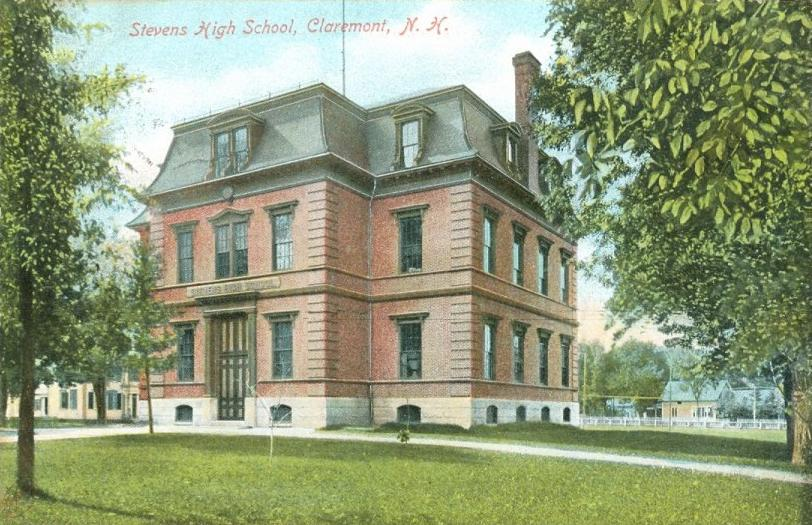
Stevens High School's original facade, ca. 1905

In the 1850s, the city of Claremont approached the state Legislature asking permission to build a public high school. At the time, public high schools did not exist in New Hampshire. The state agreed, and decided to offer permission to every town in the state so that every town could establish public high schools. Paran Stevens then made his offer to fund 50% of the $20,000 cost of development.

Stevens was a Claremont native who was the manager of the Tremont House hotel in Opera House Square, the precursor to the Moody Hotel. He eventually became the most well-known hotelier in America, managing the New England, Revere House, and the Tremont House in Boston, as well as the Fifth Avenue Hotel in New York City, among others. He was the grandfather of British humanitarian Louise Paget.

The centrally located, nearly two-acre lot on which the building sits originally housed the homestead of politician George B. Upham. The original school building contained four classrooms, a basement for heating and facilities, and a function hall on the top floor. In 1868, the citizens of Claremont voted to name the school after Stevens. Its original enrollment was 98 students, taught by 4 faculty and principal Dr. Nathan Barrows. Stevens established a permanent trust of $10,000 to help with the financial administration of the school.

Stevens died in 1872, leaving his daughters $10 million in inheritance, which allowed his daughter Mary (also known as Minnie) to become a wealthy socialite in London society and marry General Sir Arthur Henry Fitzroy Paget. Stevens added $40,000 to his trust for the high school. He also donated life-size portraits of George Washington and Daniel Webster, which still hang on the walls of the auditorium, and a Chickering concert grand piano. The portrait of Washington is influenced by Gilbert Stuart's Lansdowne Portrait, and the portrait of Webster is based on one by Albert Gallatin Hoit that originally hung in the Revere House.

Graduates of Stevens High School formally established an Alumni Association in 1882. It has been continually active ever since, holding annual reunions, and claims to be the oldest continually active high school alumni association in the country.

Stevens High School built its first addition in 1909, due to its increased student body of 156. The front of the building was expanded, adding a laboratory, classroom, a manual training room in the basement, and a headmaster's office. Enrollment quickly grew to 217 by 1914, and the building was expanded again. Enrollment was at 434 in 1929, and a third subsequent expansion added an annex of fifteen classrooms, a gymnasium, and a remodel of the auditorium and older portions of the building. The building did not need another major renovation until 1962, with the baby boomers entering high school. The student body was nearly 600 at the time, prompting a new cafeteria, improved gymnasium facilities, and twelve new classrooms. The final annex was extended along the back of the building. SHS was an early concert location for the band Aerosmith in 1971.

The school was renovated extensively in the 1990s due to accreditation issues. Its most recent renovation, completed in 2014, cost more than $12.6 million and restored original hardwood floors and other architectural elements, brought the facilities up to code, and addressed many long-standing structural issues.

== Campus ==
The school is located in a single building on the corner of Broad and Summer streets in downtown Claremont. The front of the building is the original structure, built in 1868, which consists of three floors of classrooms (including lab facilities for science classes) and administrative offices. It has been renovated several times over the years. Behind this are two expansions, one in the middle that includes three floors of classrooms and a gymnasium, and another annexation in the back, which holds two floors of classrooms and the cafeteria. The school has no student parking facilities and relies on the city's parking spaces along the median in front of the building, as well as street parking along Broad Street and Summer Street. Owing to its central location, the school does not have its own athletic fields, and instead has an agreement with the city of Claremont to use the city's facilities at neighboring Monadnock Park and Barnes Park.

== Curriculum ==
The school offers five Advanced Placement classes, leading to the AP Exam: Calculus II, Language and Composition, Literature and Composition, U.S. History, and Physics II. During the 2000–2001 school year, Stevens High School moved from a seven period day to a standard 4 x 4 block schedule, though it was changed back during the 2024-2025 school year. All class periods are 46 minutes in length, meeting 7 times per week. One credit is granted for each class that meets daily for a full year. One half credit is granted for a class that meets daily for one semester. A minimum of 20 credits is required for graduation along with 48 hours of community service. With approval from faculty and administrations, juniors and seniors are allowed to take one course (per Dartmouth term) at nearby Dartmouth College, provided they have already exhausted curricular alternatives at the high school. Stevens also offers courses in conjunction with the local Sugar River Regional Technical Center, and specific courses that offer credit within the Community College System of New Hampshire

== Athletics and extracurricular activities ==
Stevens High School's colors are red and black, and its mascot is the cardinal. The school's recognized fight song is "Glory to Stevens", sung to the melody of "Glory to Dartmouth", the fight song of nearby Dartmouth College. Its varsity sports include baseball, football, softball, basketball (boys and girls), golf, spirit team, cross country, skiing, swimming, field hockey, soccer (boys and girls), tennis, track & field, and bowling (co-ed).

The school's extracurricular activities include Amnesty International, Interact, Color Guard, Jazz Band, Stevenaires, St. Paul's Summer Program, Key Club, Literary Club, Fall Production, Comedic Acting, Senior Play, Honors Theater, Musical Theater, National Honor Society, Environmental Club, Envirothon Team, Newspaper (Journalism), Student Council, Peer Outreach, Project Challenge, Boy's State, Girl's State, Granite State Challenge, and Quiz Bowl.

== Notable alumni ==
- John Callum, politician
- Barbara Galpin (1855–1922), journalist
- Dale Girard, politician
- Kaleb Tarczewski, professional basketball player
