= Arrowhead Recreation Area =

Ski area in New Hampshire, United States

- Interactive map of Arrowhead Recreation Area
- Location: Claremont, New Hampshire, United States
- Coordinates: 43°21′46″N 72°20′00″W
- Top elevation: 1,080 ft (330 m)
- Trails: 9
- Lift system: 2 surface lifts
- Website: www.arrowheadnh.com

Arrowhead Recreation Area is a public outdoor recreation park located in and owned by the city of Claremont, New Hampshire, in the United States. Activities available include hiking, dog walking, mountain biking, and, during the winter months, alpine skiing and snow tubing. The facility is managed by The Wheelhouse bike shop and the Arrowhead Recreation Club.

== History ==
The ski area originally opened in 1962 as Arrowhead Skiway. It operated irregularly for three decades. Terrain for all abilities was available, served by two Poma surface lifts.

The ski area sat dormant for much of the 1990s, before reopening in 2002. The area currently offers hiking and dog walking and expert-level enduro-style mountain bike trails, a rope tow for alpine skiing and tubing, and has terrain lit for night operations. While the area once sported a 600-foot (180 m) vertical drop, only 120 feet (37 m) are currently lift-serviced.

== Activities ==
Arrowhead Recreation Area hosts an advanced enduro mountain bike trail system, a shared access ATV, bike and hiking trail, as well as snow tubing, ice skating, skiing, snowmobile trails and snowboarding in the winter. The Arrowhead summit, also known as Flat Rock, offers views of Claremont and surrounding areas. The Arrowhead property is city owned and operated by The Wheelhouse bike shop and the Arrowhead Recreation Club (ARC).
