= Valley Regional Hospital =

Geography
- Location: 243 Elm Street, Claremont, New Hampshire, United States
- Coordinates: 43°23′06″N 72°20′30″W

Services
- Beds: 25

Helipads
- Helipad: Yes (FAA LID: NH97)

History
- Founded: 1893

Links
- Website: www.vrh.org
- Lists: Hospitals in New Hampshire

Valley Regional Hospital is a hospital located on 243 Elm Street in Claremont, New Hampshire, United States. It was established in 1893 as Cottage Hospital. As a 25-bed, 24/7-staffed emergency department hospital, it is the only such facility in Sullivan County. In a typical year 12,500 people will visit its emergency admission section.

In 2015, Valley Regional Hospital was rated as being in the top 25 of hospitals nationally on a set of composite quality and patient experience measures.

Starting 2015, the hospital began using green fuel, specifically 250,000 gallons per year of cellulosic ethanol.
