= Dale Girard =

American politician

Member of the New Hampshire House of Representatives from the Sullivan County 6th district
- Incumbent
- Assumed office December 4, 2024

Personal details
- Party: Democratic (before 2026); Republican (2026–present)
- Website: Campaign website

Dale Girard is an American politician serving as a member of the New Hampshire House of Representatives for the 6th district. He assumed office on December 4, 2024. Formerly a Democrat, he changed his party affiliation to Republican in 2026.

Girard graduated from Stevens High School and earned an associate degree in business. His career experience includes owning Golden Cross Ambulance and working as a paramedic. He also serves as the mayor of Claremont, New Hampshire, and as the president of the Claremont Rotary Club.

Girard lost his bid for re-election to the statehouse in 2026.
