= Central Business District (Claremont, New Hampshire) =

- U.S. National Register of Historic Places
- U.S. Historic district
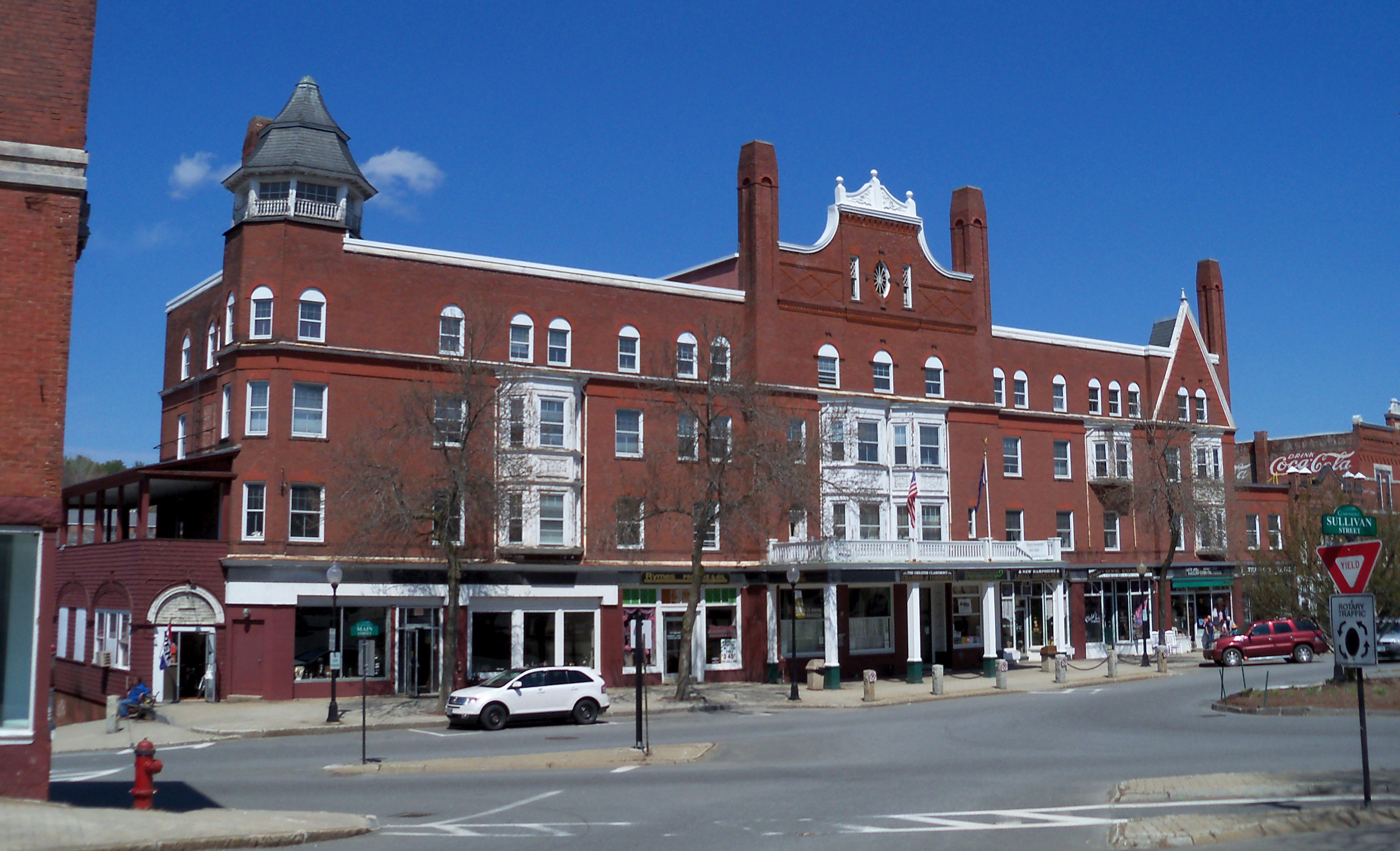
- Hotel Claremont, a.k.a. Moody Hotel

- Location within New Hampshire Location within the United States
- Location: Roughly bounded by Crescent, Broad, Pine and Franklin Sts., Claremont, New Hampshire
- Area: 40 acres (16 ha)
- Architectural style: Late 19th and 20th Century Revivals, Greek Revival, Late Victorian
- MPS: Downtown Claremont and Lower Village MRA
- NRHP reference No.: 78003454
- Added to NRHP: February 21, 1978

The Central Business District of Claremont, New Hampshire, is centered on Broad Street Park and the Claremont Opera House (a.k.a. City Hall), and the area between the park and the Sugar River, whose power was responsible for Claremont's growth in the 19th century. The district was listed on the National Register of Historic Places in 1978.

== Description and history ==
Claremont's Central Business District encompasses an area of about 40 acres (16 ha), centered on Broad Street Park and Tremont Square. The historic district includes buildings facing these two areas, as well as adjacent blocks of Sullivan, Pleasant and Tremont streets. The Claremont Opera House occupies a prominent central location, with the public library, main fire station, and Universalist Church occupying prominent locations facing Broad Street Park. Commercial buildings, most dating to the late 19th century, line most of the remaining streets. The Hotel Claremont, also known as the Hotel Moody or the Moody Hotel, is an elaborate Queen Anne/Colonial Revival four-story block on Tremont Square.

Broad Street Park served as the town's historic common, and was laid out in the 1790s. In the 1830s, industrial concerns established the Lower Village, about one mile to the west, where paper mills and other industrial concerns grew. The downtown business district grew organically until the 1880s, when an association of local business owners coordinated the formal development of Tremont Square, and its further growth into the 20th century.

== See also ==
- National Register of Historic Places listings in Sullivan County, New Hampshire
