= Ascutney, Vermont =

Census-designated place in Vermont, United States

- Census-designated place
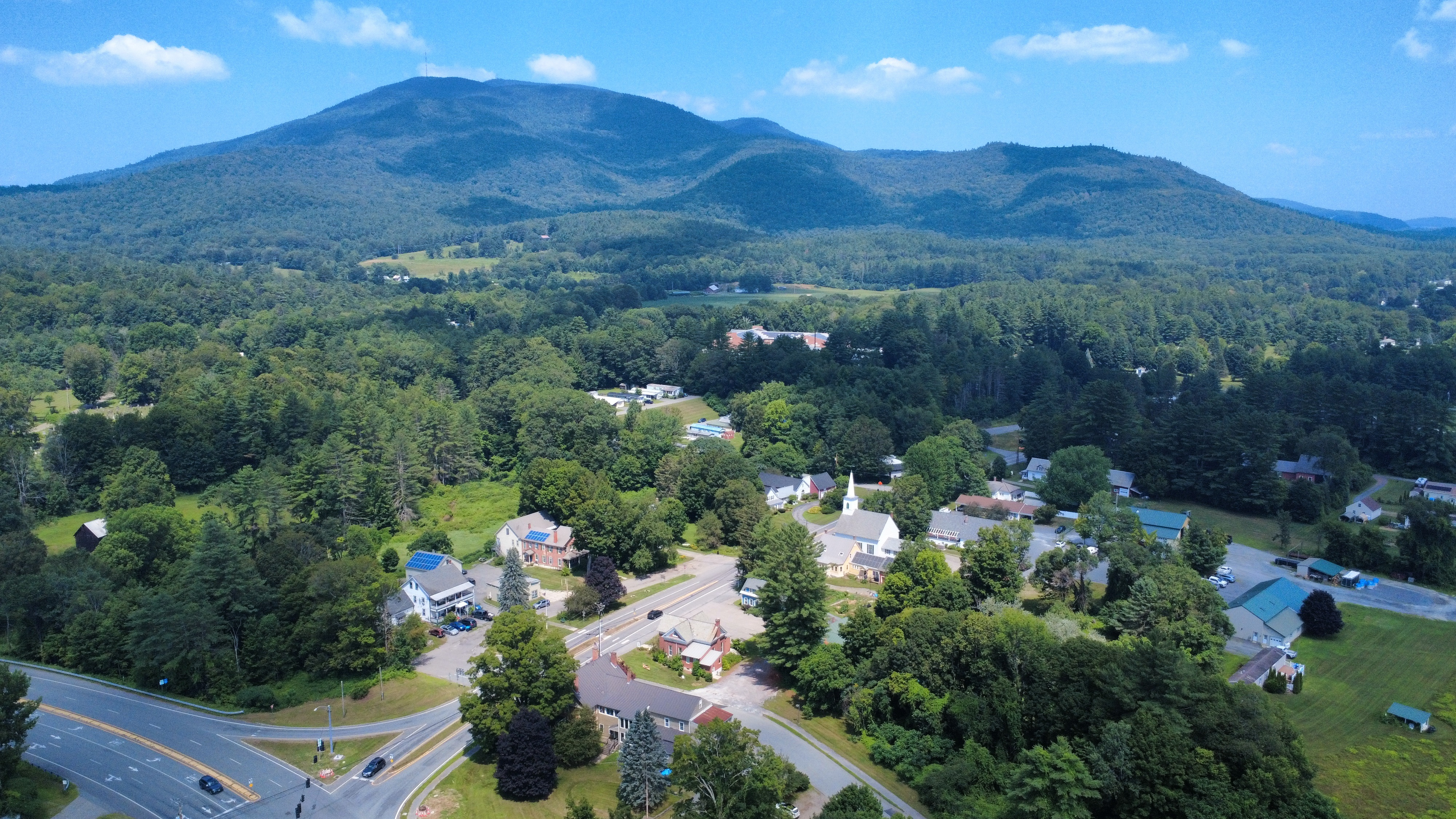
- Weathersfield, VT, with Mount Ascutney visible beyond

- Location in Windsor County and the state of Vermont.
- Coordinates: 43°24′29″N 72°24′25″W
- Country: United States
- State: Vermont
- County: Windsor

Area
  - Total: 1.7 sq mi (4.3 km^{2})
  - Land: 1.7 sq mi (4.3 km^{2})
  - Water: 0 sq mi (0.0 km^{2})
- Elevation: 413 ft (126 m)

Population (2020)
  - Total: 529
  - Density: 320/sq mi (120/km^{2})
- Time zone: UTC-5 (Eastern (EST))
  - Summer (DST): UTC-4 (EDT)
- ZIP Codes: 05030 (Ascutney); 05089 (Windsor); 05156 (Springfield)
- Area code: 802
- FIPS code: 50-01750
- GNIS feature ID: 2586615

Ascutney is an unincorporated village and census-designated place (CDP) in the town of Weathersfield, Windsor County, Vermont, United States. It is located in the northeastern section of Weathersfield, in the portion of that town adjacent to Mount Ascutney, after which the village is named. As of the 2020 census, Ascutney had a population of 529.

== Geography ==
The southern flanks of Mount Ascutney rise to the north of the CDP, with its summit in the neighboring towns of Windsor and West Windsor.

U.S. Route 5 runs north–south through Ascutney, intersected by Vermont routes 12 and 131 at the center of the CDP. Interstate 91 forms the western boundary of the CDP and serves Ascutney by Exit 8. From Ascutney, Route 12 crosses the Connecticut River into Claremont, New Hampshire.
