= Brownsville, Vermont =

- Unincorporated community
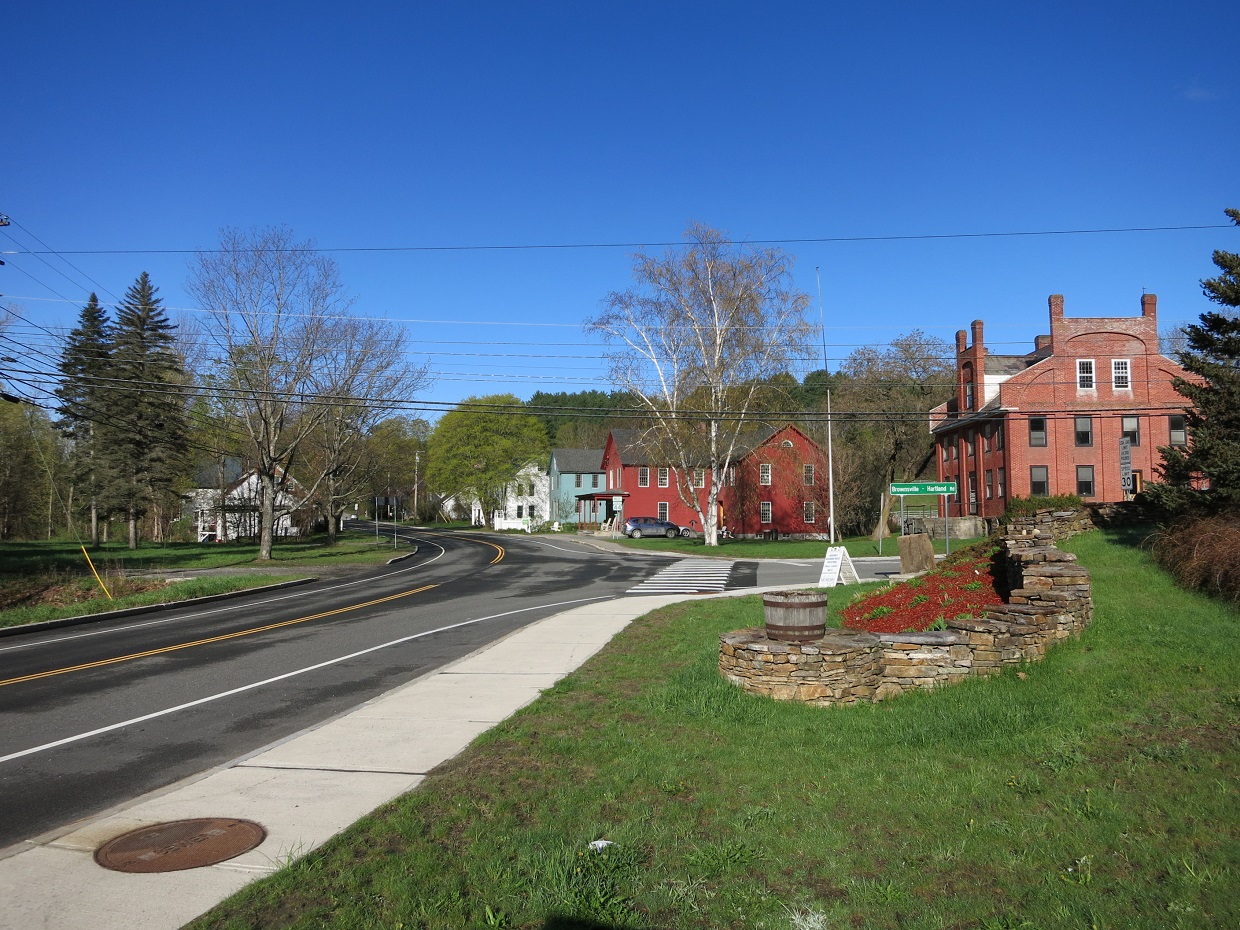
- Brownsville, VT looking west along Route 44

- Location in Windsor County and the state of Vermont
- Coordinates: 43°28′07″N 72°28′15″W
- Country: United States
- State: Vermont
- County: Windsor
- Elevation: 682 ft (208 m)
- Time zone: UTC-5 (Eastern (EST))
  - Summer (DST): UTC-4 (EDT)
- ZIP code: 05037
- Area code: 802
- GNIS feature ID: 1456613
- Website: www.westwindsorvt.govoffice2.com

Brownsville is an unincorporated community in West Windsor, Vermont, United States. Located on Vermont Route 44, the village houses a number of administrative offices for the town of West Windsor.

== History ==
The village derives its name from two settlers, John and Briant Brown. The West Windsor Historical Society is in Brownsville and has a wealth of information on the sheep farms and industries that sustained the early residents.

Just east of Brownsville is the entrance to Ascutney Mountain Resort, which used to be one of the major ski areas in the state, until it closed for good in 2010 and their ski lifts were sold in August 2014. In 2015, Brownsville bought the failed ski area, working with the state of Vermont and the nonprofit Trust for Public Land.

== Geography ==
Slightly south and west of Brownsville is the 656-acre (2.65 km^{2}) Little Ascutney Wildlife Management Area, a state owned conservation area hosting wildlife such as white-tailed deer, fisher, coyotes, bobcats, beaver and otter.

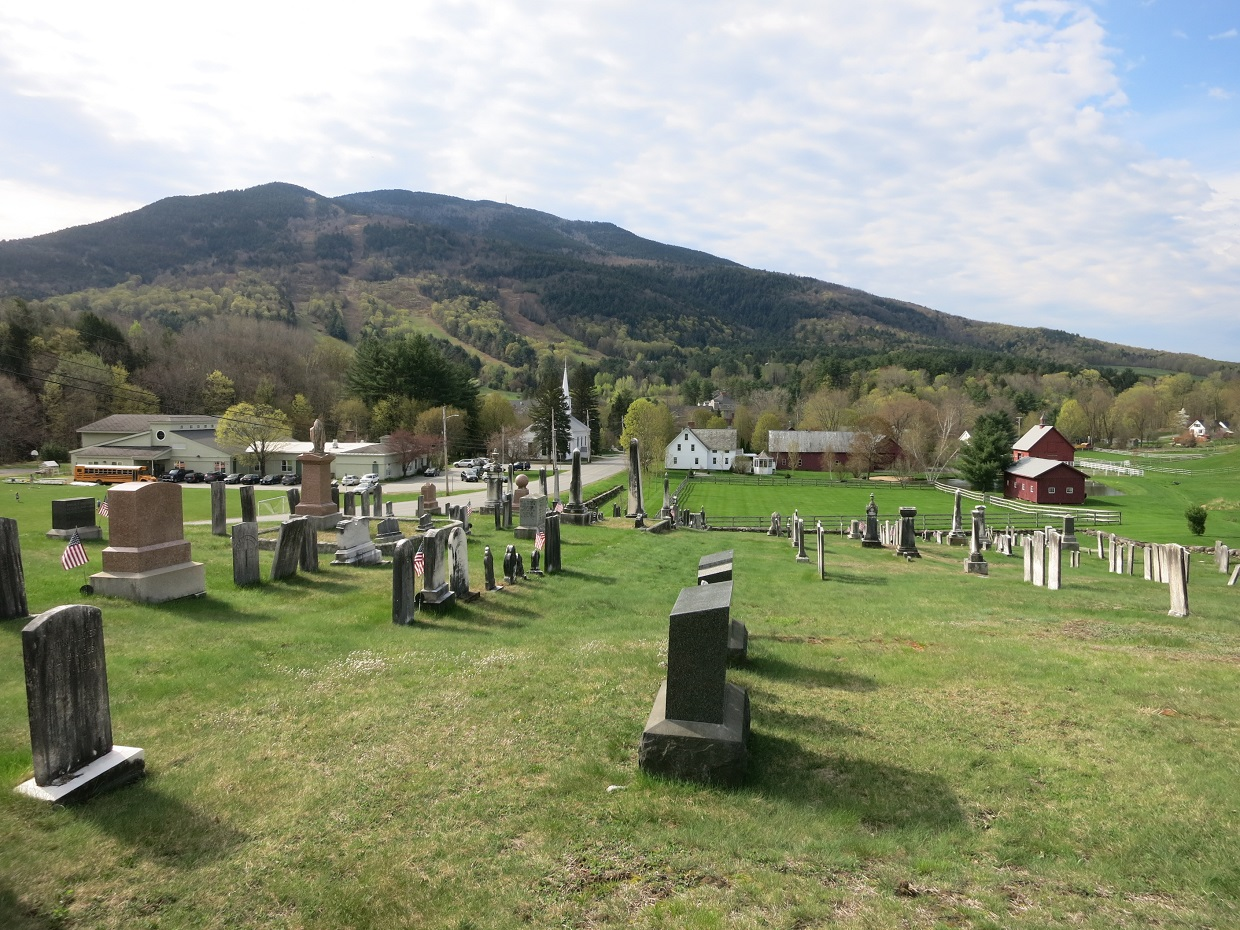
View of town and Mt. Ascutney from the cemetery

=== Covered Bridges ===
Three of Vermont's covered bridges are nearby – Best's Bridge near Churchill Road and Bowers Bridge, both of which are listed in the National Register of Historic Places. The Twigg bridge on Yale Road was moved to its location by a developer and was heavily damaged by wind in 2002. The flooding caused by tropical storm Irene in 2011 damaged several bridges such as the Bowers Bridge.

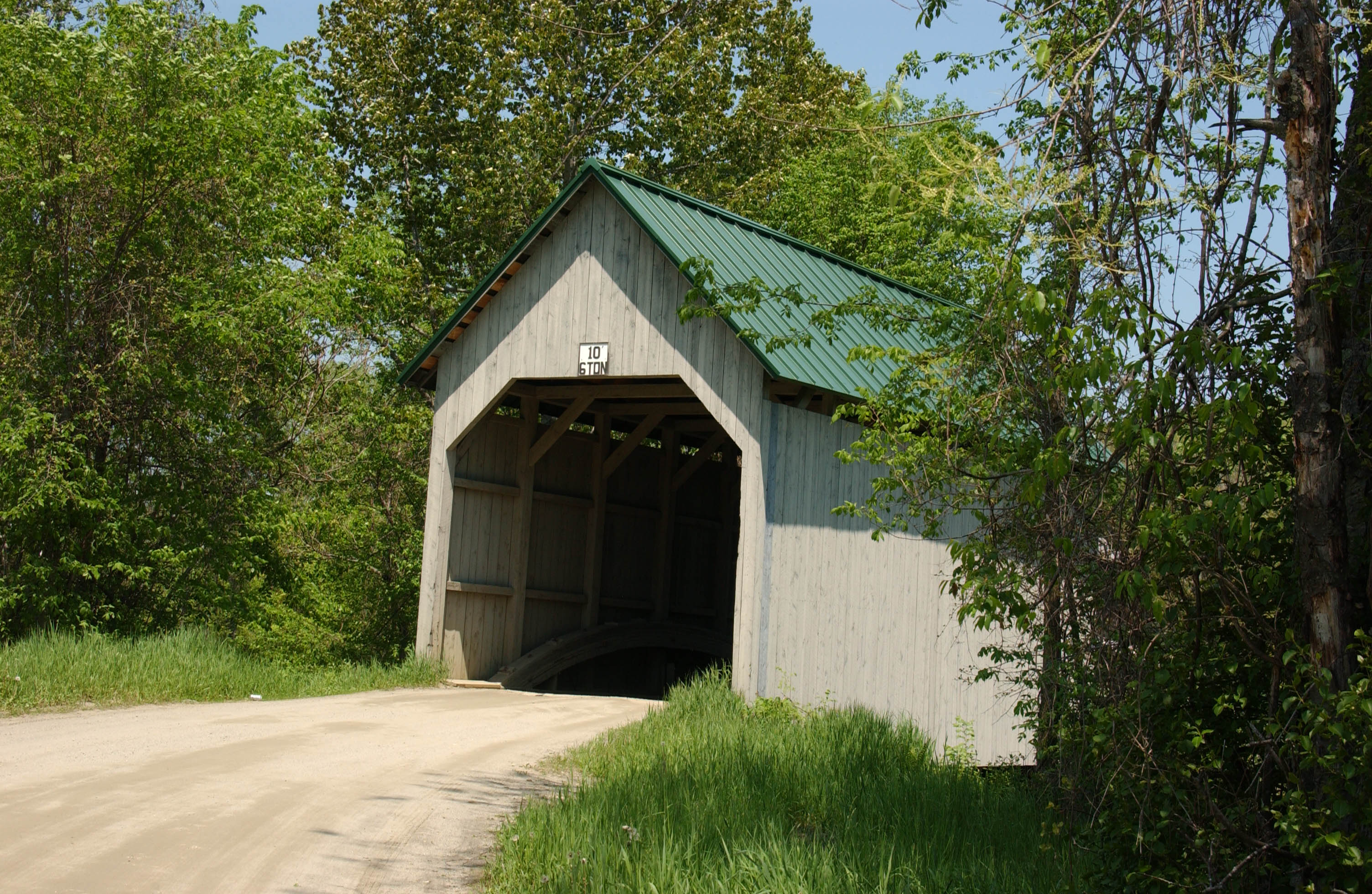
Best's Covered Bridge

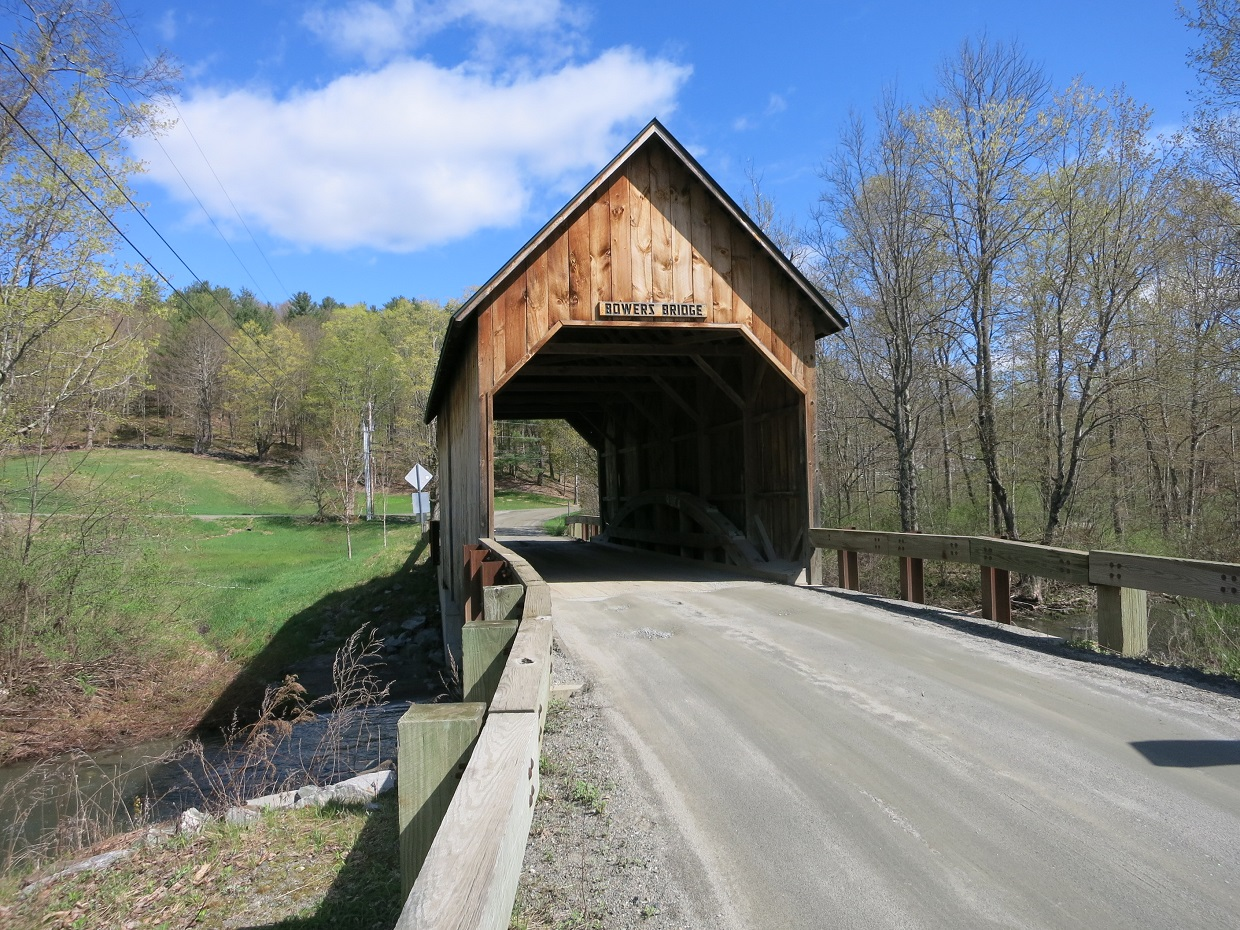
Bowers Covered Bridge

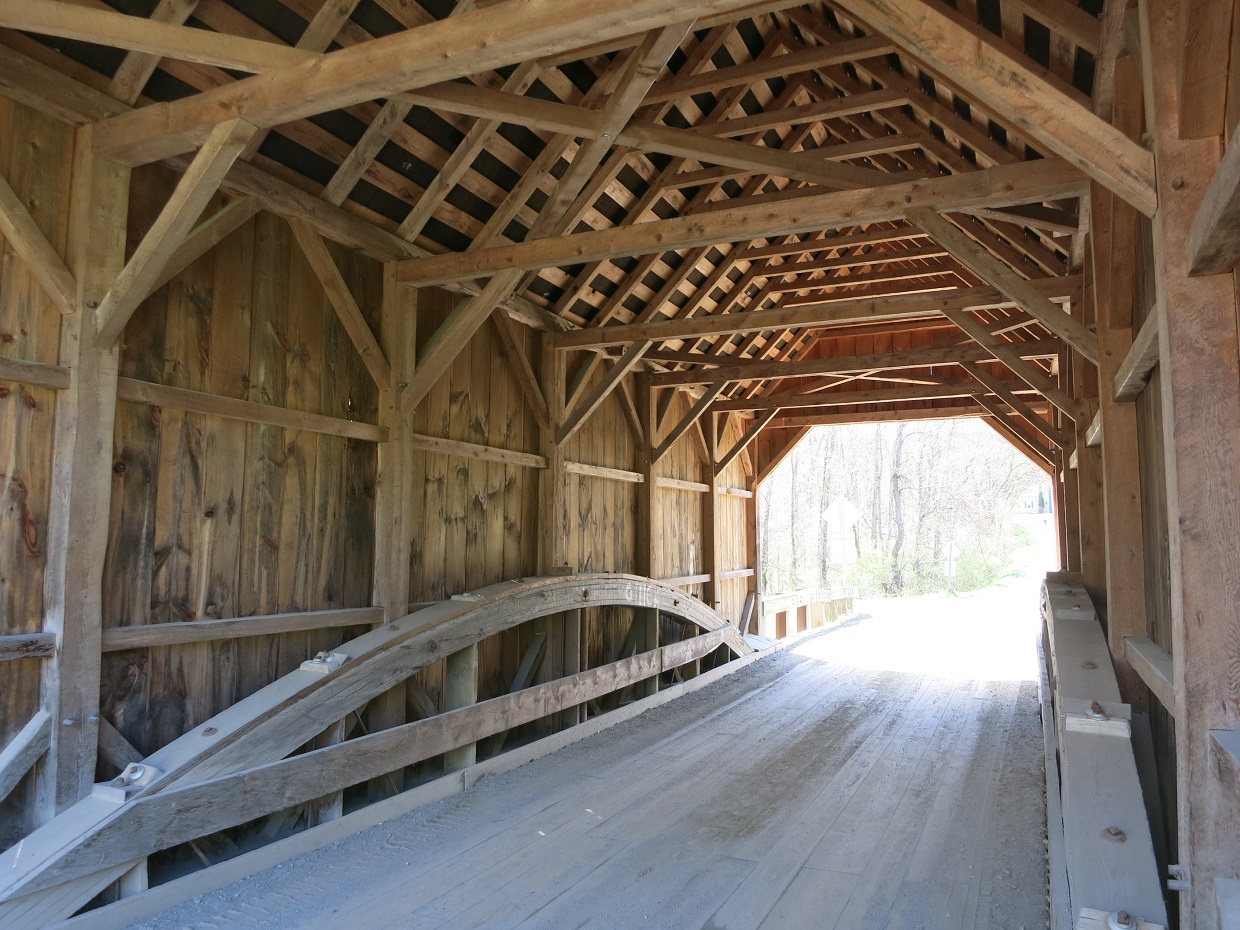
Construction detail of Bowers Bridge

== Government ==
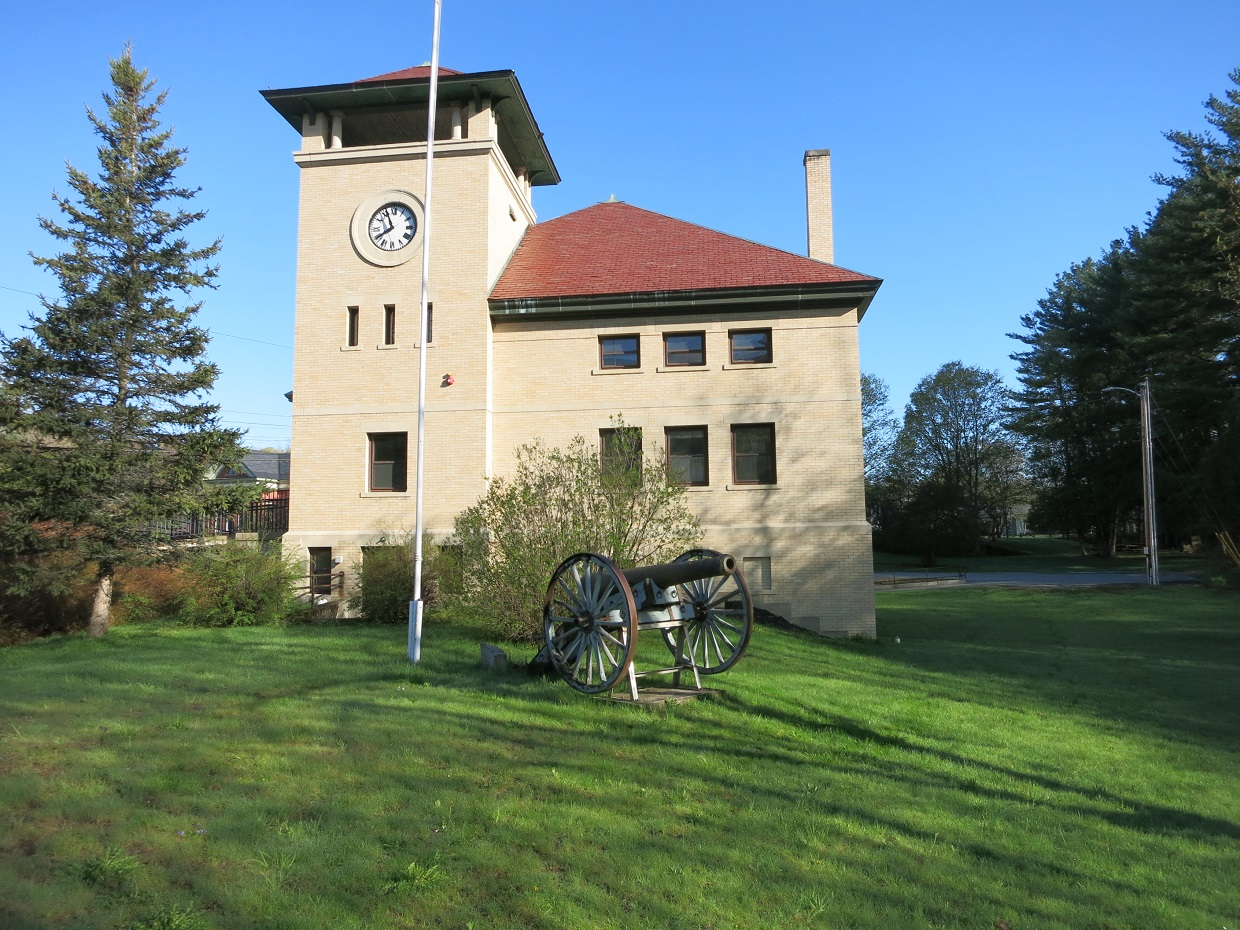
West Windsor Office Building

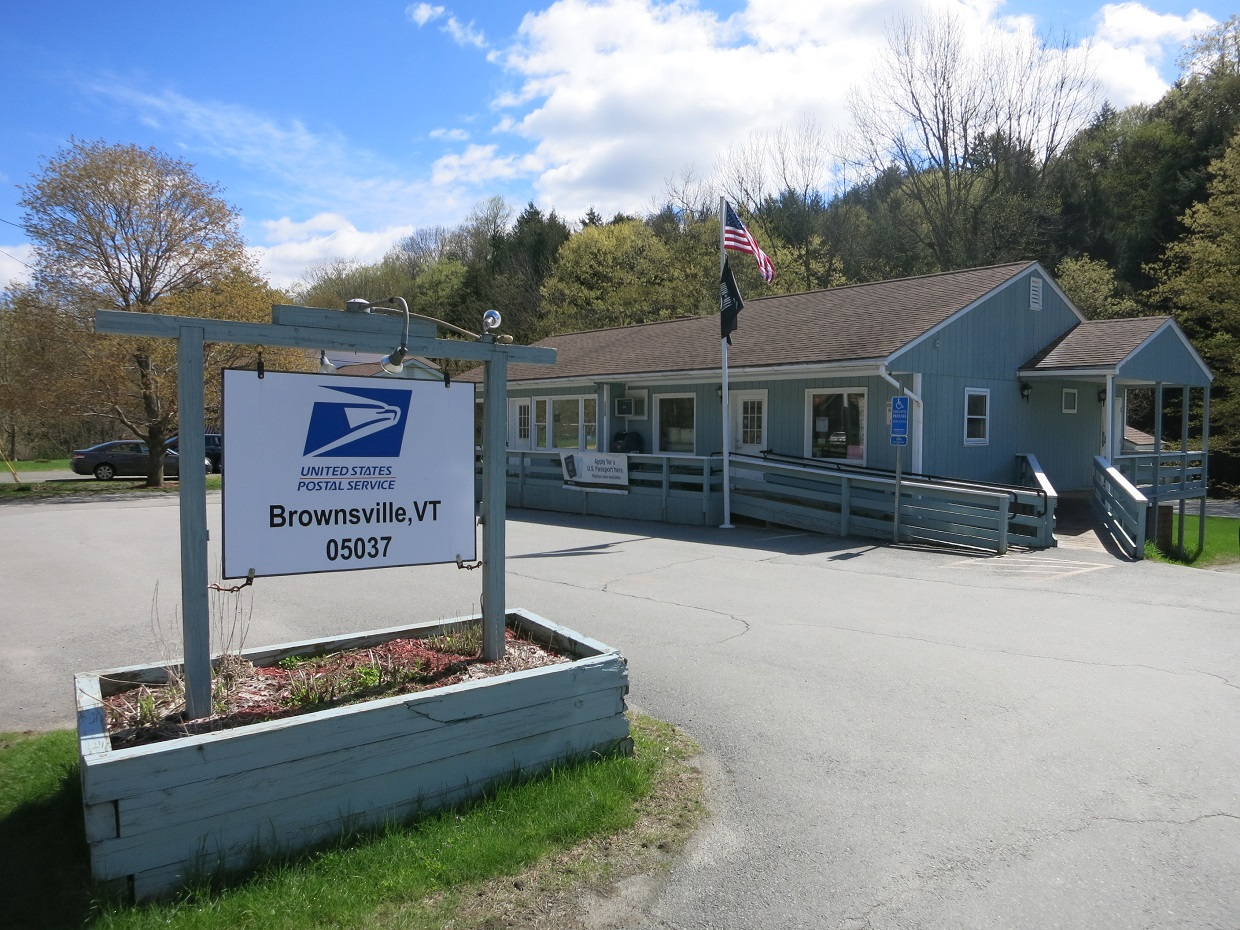
US Post Office on Highway 44
