= Ascutney Mountain Resort =

Ski area in Vermont, United States

Coordinates: 43°27′48″N 72°27′58″W

Ascutney Mountain
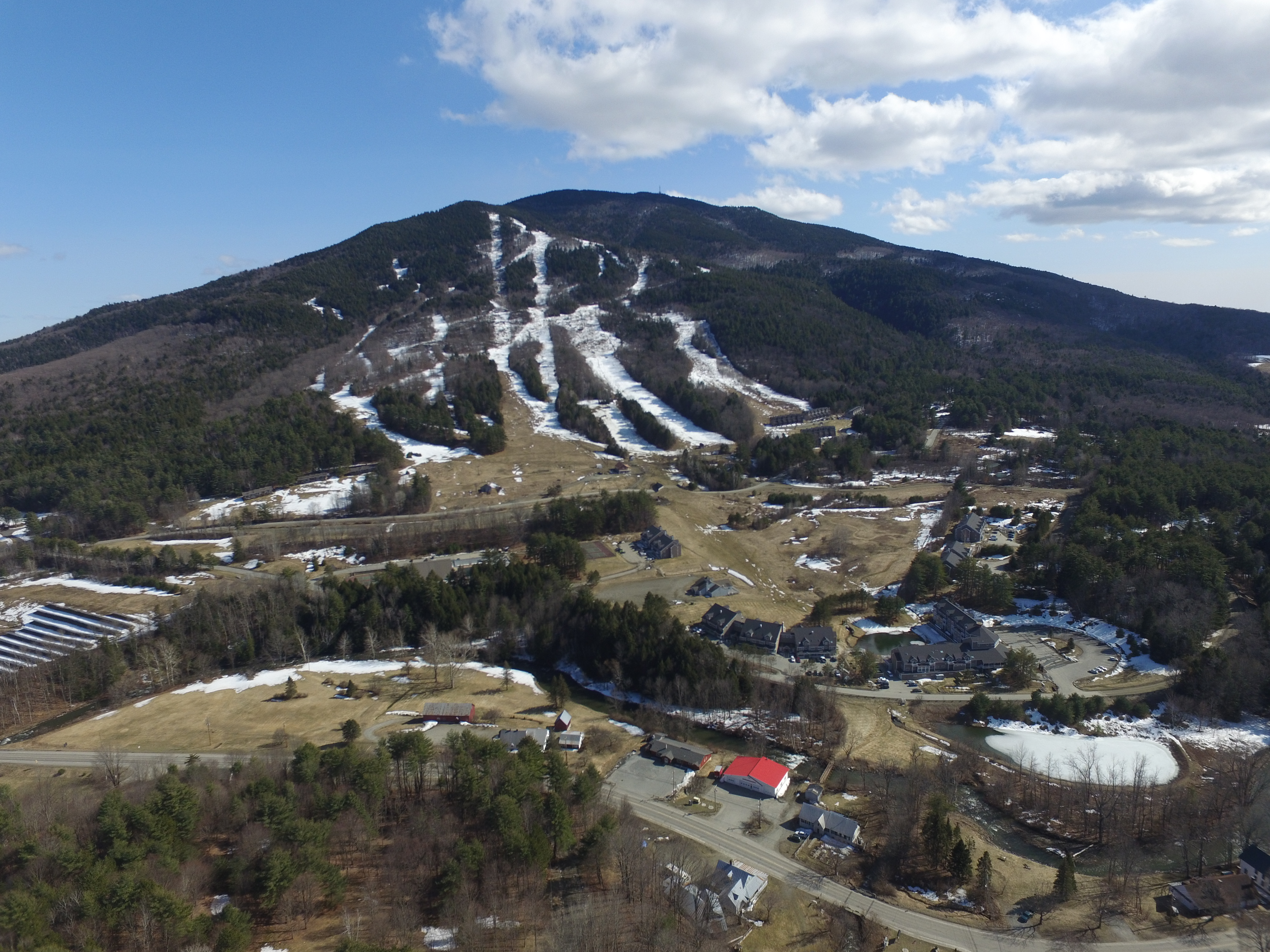
- Interactive map of Ascutney Mountain
- Location: Brownsville, Vermont, US
- Nearest city: Windsor, Vermont, US
- Top elevation: 2,520 ft (770 m)
- Base elevation: 720 ft (220 m)
- Skiable area: 200 acres (81 ha)
- Trails: 57
- Longest run: 2.5 m (8 ft 2 in)
- Lift system: 5 chairs, 1 surface lifts
- Terrain parks: 1
- Snowfall: 16.7 ft (5.1 m)
- Website: Ascutney Outdoors

Ascutney Mountain Resort was a downhill ski area on the western side of Mount Ascutney in Brownsville, Vermont that operated from 1946 until 2010. It was purchased by local communities and the Trust for Public Land in 2015, with plans to reopen a smaller version of a ski area, and keep the rest of the mountain preserved.

Ascutney Mountain now hosts the operations of Ascutney Outdoors, a 501(c)3 organization.

== History ==
The Mt. Ascutney Ski Club cut the first trail at Ascutney in 1938. Skiers initially had to hike up the mountain to be able to ski down the trail, now known as Screaming Eagle. In 1946, Catharine Cushman, with the help of others, began to develop real estate on the mountain, in essence opening Ascutney as a ski area. It wasn't until the second year, 1947, that two rope tows were installed to take skiers up the mountain. The first groomer was bought in 1947, while snowmaking was installed ten years later, when the ski area was owned by John Howland. Kurt Albert is the only man to ski 24 straight hours at Ascutney to raise money for charity in 2001.

When Summit Ventures owned Ascutney, they invested $80 million into operating the resort, but had to file for bankruptcy in 1990. After three years of closure, Steven and Susan Plausteiner from New York City bought Ascutney for over one million dollars. Improvements under the Plausteiners include snowmaking coverage being expanded to 95% of the skiable area and installation of a high-speed detachable quad chairlift in 2000 from the bottom of the mountain to a new, higher peak.

== 2010 closure ==
In 2010, rumors spread of severe debt and financial troubles on the part of the owners, the Plausteiners. In October 2010, the State of Vermont admitted that Ascutney Mountain had not yet filed for lift inspections, and the resort did not open for the 2010 winter.

Despite the closure of the ski operations, the resort hotel at the base of the mountain, a Holiday Inn affiliate, continued to operate. Holiday Inn Club Vacations had no ownership ties to the ski operation.

Following a protracted legal battle, Dan Purjes of MFW and Mark Blundell of UTVT, the principal lien holders on the property, assumed ownership as the only bidder at an auction of the resort's assets in November, 2013. The high speed quad, known as the "North Peak Express," was sold to Crotched Mountain, which installed it in 2012. The Triple Chairs were removed in 2014 and sold to Pats Peak ski area in Henniker, N.H. In 2017, Pats Peak re-installed the Snowdance Triple Chair, a CTEC Triple Chair that had operated as backup for the North Peak Express Quad, as the Peak Triple to replace a 1962 GMD Mueller Double Chair. On January 8, 2015, the ski lodge burnt down.

== Ascutney Outdoors ==
In late 2015, a group of local residents purchased the area with help from the Trust for Public Land, planning to open a smaller community ski area on the 468-acre property while keeping much of the land preserved as open space. It is now owned by the town of West Windsor, Vermont. Inaugurated in 2015 to maintain the property for recreation and operate its winter sports facilities, the nonprofit Ascutney Outdoors had a tow-rope in operation on the slope by 2016. The subsequent year it demolished the burnt-out former lodge and began construction on the new "Ascutney Outdoor Center" and a warming hut. Construction on the facilities finished in 2018, and in 2019 Ascutney Outdoors installed a 1,800-foot T-bar lift which, as of 2025, served eight maintained ski trails covering 26 acres.

== Mountain statistics at 2010 closure ==
- Vertical drop: 1,800 ft

=== Trails ===
- Skiable area: 200 acres (0.81 km^{2})
  - Glades: 50 acres (0.20 km^{2})
- 57 trails
  - 14 novice - 24.5%
  - 22 intermediate - 38.5%
  - 21 advanced and expert - 37%
- Longest trail - 2.5 miles (4 km)

=== Lifts ===
- 6 total
  - 1 high-speed detachable quad chair
  - 3 triple chairs
  - 1 double chair
  - 1 surface lift
