= Claremont Municipal Airport =

Airport in New Hampshire, United States

- IATA: CNH; ICAO: KCNH; FAA LID: CNH

Summary
- Airport type: Public
- Owner: City of Claremont
- Serves: Claremont, New Hampshire
- Elevation AMSL: 545 ft (166 m)
- Coordinates: 43°22′14″N 072°22′07″W
- Website: CNH Website

Map
- Interactive map of Claremont Municipal Airport

Runways
Direction	Length		Surface
Direction	ft	m	Surface
11/29	3,100	945	Asphalt

Statistics (2008)
- Aircraft operations: 10,500
- Based aircraft: 29
- Source: Federal Aviation Administration

Claremont Municipal Airport (IATA: CNH, ICAO: KCNH, FAA LID: CNH) is a public-use airport located one nautical mile (1.85 km) west of the central business district of Claremont, a city in Sullivan County, New Hampshire, United States. This general aviation airport is publicly owned by the City of Claremont. It is included in the Federal Aviation Administration (FAA) National Plan of Integrated Airport Systems for 2017–2021, in which it is categorized as a local general aviation facility.

The nearest airport with scheduled airline service is Lebanon Municipal Airport.

== Facilities and aircraft ==
Claremont Municipal Airport covers an area of 120 acres (49 ha) at an elevation of 545 feet (166 m) above mean sea level. It has one asphalt paved runway designated 11/29 which measures 3,100 by 100 feet (945 x 30 m).

For the 12-month period ending December 31, 2008, the airport had 10,500 general aviation aircraft operations, an average of 28 per day. At that time there were 29 aircraft based at this airport: 83% single-engine, 10% multi-engine, 3% helicopter and 3% ultralight.

== See also ==
- List of airports in New Hampshire
