= Upper Valley Land Trust =

The Upper Valley Land Trust (UVLT), headquartered in Hanover, New Hampshire, United States, is a 501(c)(3) non-profit land conservation organization that serves over 40 towns in the Upper Connecticut River Valley of Vermont and New Hampshire. Founded in 1985, UVLT helps landowners and communities in its region protect lands that have important natural resource values and help define the rural character of the Upper Valley. UVLT works with willing landowners to protect working farms, forest lands, river and stream frontage, wildlife habitat, scenic landscapes, and recreational resources from future development. The primary tool that UVLT uses to conserve land is a legal document known as a conservation easement which runs with the land in perpetuity. As of 2008, UVLT had conserved over 37,000 acres (150 km^{2}) in its region. In a recent Land Trust Alliance (LTA) census, UVLT was ranked 7th in the nation for the number of conservation easements it holds out of more than 1,600 LTA-member land trusts.
