= West Windsor, Vermont =

- Town
- West Windsor, Vermont, from the southeast

- Location in Windsor County and the state of Vermont.
- Coordinates: 43°29′48″N 72°29′30″W
- Country: United States
- State: Vermont
- County: Windsor
- Communities: Brownsville; Sheddsville

Area
  - Total: 24.7 sq mi (64.0 km^{2})
  - Land: 24.6 sq mi (63.8 km^{2})
  - Water: 0.077 sq mi (0.2 km^{2})
- Elevation: 1,037 ft (316 m)

Population (2020)
  - Total: 1,344
  - Density: 54.6/sq mi (21.1/km^{2})
- Time zone: UTC-5 (Eastern (EST))
  - Summer (DST): UTC-4 (EDT)
- ZIP Codes: 05089 (West Windsor); 05037 (Brownsville); 05062 (Reading)
- Area code: 802
- FIPS code: 50-83050
- GNIS feature ID: 1462257
- Website: www.westwindsorvt.govoffice2.com

West Windsor is a town in Windsor County, Vermont, United States. The population was 1,344 at the 2020 census. It was known for its Ascutney Mountain Resort, which closed in 2010 and was bought by its citizens in 2015.

== Geography ==
According to the United States Census Bureau, the town has a total area of 24.7 square miles (64.0 km^{2}), of which 24.6 square miles (63.8 km^{2}) is land and 0.077 square miles (0.2 km^{2}), or 0.37%, is water.

The unincorporated village of Brownsville is one of the few urban areas in the town and sits at the northwestern base of Mount Ascutney (elevation 3143 ft.).

== Demographics ==
Historical population
Census	Pop.	Note	%±
1850	1,002		—
1860	924		−7.8%
1870	708		−23.4%
1880	690		−2.5%
1890	570		−17.4%
1900	513		−10.0%
1910	569		10.9%
1920	514		−9.7%
1930	512		−0.4%
1940	494		−3.5%
1950	504		2.0%
1960	539		6.9%
1970	571		5.9%
1980	763		33.6%
1990	923		21.0%
2000	1,067		15.6%
2010	1,099		3.0%
2020	1,344		22.3%
U.S. Decennial Census

At the 2000 census there were 1,067 people, 456 households, and 327 families in the town. The population density was 43.2 people per square mile (16.7/km^{2}). There were 716 housing units at an average density of 29.0 per square mile (11.2/km^{2}). The racial makeup of the town was 98.31% White, 0.28% African American, 0.28% Native American, 0.19% Asian, and 0.94% from two or more races. Hispanic or Latino of any race were 1.59%.

Of the 456 households 28.9% had children under the age of 18 living with them, 63.4% were married couples living together, 5.5% had a female householder with no husband present, and 28.1% were non-families. 22.8% of households were one person and 7.0% were one person aged 65 or older. The average household size was 2.34 and the average family size was 2.74.

The age distribution was 21.6% under the age of 18, 5.0% from 18 to 24, 23.1% from 25 to 44, 34.9% from 45 to 64, and 15.6% 65 or older. The median age was 45 years. For every 100 females, there were 99.4 males. For every 100 females age 18 and over, there were 99.3 males.

The median household income was $54,792 and the median family income was $63,456. Males had a median income of $33,309 versus $35,750 for females. The per capita income for the town was $28,360. About 5.1% of families and 5.6% of the population were below the poverty line, including 7.7% of those under age 18 and 3.1% of those age 65 or over.

According to the NY Times, between 2010 and 2020, the town's population jumped over 20 percent and median single-family home sale prices more than doubled, to $329,750.

As of the 2020 U.S. Census, the population of West Windsor, Vermont, was 1,344. Recent estimates indicate a modest increase, with the population reaching approximately 1,373 by 2023. This growth reflects a 2.2% rise over three years, averaging an annual growth rate of about 0.37%.

== Economy ==
In 2010 the Ascutney Mountain Resort closed because of scant snow and mismanagement. In 2015, the town bought the failed ski area with the help of nonprofit Trust for Public Land and residents charted a sustainable, volunteer-driven path.

== Notable people ==
- Rollin Amsden, U.S. Marshal for Vermont
- Charles Bronson, Actor, interred at Brownsville Cemetery.
