= New Market =

New Market may refer to:

== Bangladesh ==
- New Market, Dhaka
- New Market, Khulna, in Sonadanga Model Thana
- New Market, Chittagong, near Government City College, Chattogram

== India ==
- New Market, Bhopal
- New Market, Kolkata

== Jamaica ==
- New Market, Jamaica

== United States ==
- New Market, Alabama
- New Market, Delaware
- New Market, Indiana
- New Market, Clark County, Indiana
- New Market, Iowa
- New Market, Kentucky
- New Market, Maryland
- New Market, Minnesota
- New Market, Missouri
- New Market, Hunterdon County, New Jersey
- New Market, Middlesex County, New Jersey
- New Market, Ohio
- New Market (Philadelphia, Pennsylvania), listed on the NRHP
- New Market, Pennsylvania
- New Market (Greeleyville, South Carolina), listed on the NRHP
- New Market, Tennessee
- New Market, Virginia
- New Market, Washington, a settlement now called Tumwater, Washington
- New Market Historic District (disambiguation), a list of places on the National Register of Historic Places (NRHP)
- New Market Presbyterian Church (disambiguation)
- New Market Township (disambiguation)

== See also ==
- Neumarkt (disambiguation), places in German-speaking areas
- Newmarket (disambiguation)
- Nieuwmarkt, square in Amsterdam, Netherlands
- Novi Pazar (disambiguation), places in South Slavic countries
