= Newmarket =

Newmarket may refer to:

== Communities ==
=== Australia ===
- Newmarket, Queensland

=== Canada ===
- Newmarket, Ontario

=== Ireland ===
- Newmarket, County Cork
- Newmarket-on-Fergus, in County Clare
  - Newmarket-on-Fergus (Roman Catholic parish), in the Roman Catholic Diocese of Killaloe

=== New Zealand ===
- Newmarket, New Zealand, an Auckland suburb

=== United Kingdom ===
- Newmarket, Flintshire, former name of the Welsh village of Trelawnyd between 1710 and 1954
- Newmarket, Gloucestershire, a hamlet in England
- Newmarket, Lewis, a village in the Outer Hebrides, Scotland
- Newmarket, Suffolk, an English market town known as the global centre of Thoroughbred horse racing

=== United States ===
- Newmarket, Marion County, Missouri, an unincorporated community
- Newmarket, New Hampshire, a town in Rockingham County
  - Newmarket (CDP), New Hampshire, the main village in the town

== Companies ==
- Newmarket Capital Group, an American film financing company based in Los Angeles
- NewMarket Corporation, an American chemical company based in Richmond, Virginia
- The Newmarket Era, a Canadian newspaper in Ontario
- Newmarket Films, a defunct American film production and distribution company
- Newmarket Holidays, a British tour operator based in Greater London
- Newmarket North Mall, a defunct America shopping mall in Hampton, Virginia
- Newmarket Press, a defunct American publisher based in New York City

== Electoral districts ==
- Newmarket (UK Parliament constituency), a Parliamentary constituency, 1885–1918
- Newmarket—Aurora, a federal electoral district in Ontario, Canada
  - Newmarket—Aurora (provincial electoral district), a provincial electoral district there
- Newmarket Rural District, in Cambridgeshire, England, 1894–1974

== Geographic features ==
- Newmarket Heath, in Suffolk, England
- Newmarket Hill, Sussex, in England
- Newmarket Park, in Auckland, New Zealand
- Newmarket Ridge, in Suffolk, England

== Historic locations ==
- Big Stable Newmarket, a heritage-listed stable in Sydney, Australia
- Newmarket Air Raid Shelter, a heritage-listed air raid shelter in Brisbane, Queensland, Australia
- Newmarket Brickworks Chimney, a heritage-listed brickworks in Brisbane, Queensland, Australia
- Newmarket Hotel, a heritage-listed former hotel in Hamilton Hill, Western Australia
- Newmarket Industrial and Commercial Historic District, in Rockingham County, New Hampshire, U.S.
- Newmarket Workshops, former railway workshops in Auckland, New Zealand

== Schools ==
=== Australia ===
- Newmarket State School, in Brisbane, Queensland
- Newmarket State High School, in Brisbane, Queensland

=== Canada ===
- Newmarket High School, a secondary school in Ontario

=== United Kingdom ===
- Newmarket Academy, in Suffolk, England

=== United States ===
- Newmarket Junior-Senior High School, in Rockingham County, New Hampshire

== Sports ==
=== Australia ===
- Newmarket Handicap, an annual horse race in Australia
- Newmarket SFC, a football team in Brisbane, Queensland

=== Canada ===
- Newmarket Hurricanes, a defunct Tier II Junior "A" ice hockey team
- Newmarket Royals, a defunct junior ice hockey team
- Newmarket Saints, a defunct minor league hockey team
- Newmarket Saints (OLA), a box lacrosse team

=== Ireland ===
- Newmarket GAA, a Gaelic football and hurling club in County Cork
- Newmarket-on-Fergus GAA, a Gaelic football and hurling club in County Clare

=== United Kingdom ===
- Newmarket Racecourse, in Suffolk, England
- Newmarket Road (football ground), former home ground for Norwich City
- Newmarket Town F.C., a football club in Suffolk, England
- Newmarket Town Plate, a British horse race run annually since 1665
- Newmarket Stadium, a proposed stadium in West Yorkshire, England
- Newmarket Stakes, an annual horse race in England

== Transportation ==
=== Australia ===
- Newmarket railway station, Brisbane
- Newmarket railway station, Melbourne

=== Canada ===
- Newmarket Bus Terminal, in Ontario
- Newmarket Canal, an abandoned barge canal project in Ontario
- Newmarket GO Station, a station in the GO Transit network in Ontario
- Newmarket Transit, a defunct transit system now merged with York Region Transit

=== New Zealand ===
- Newmarket Line, a railway line in Auckland
- Newmarket Railway Station, New Zealand, a local train station in Auckland
- Newmarket Viaduct, a major motorway bridge in Auckland

=== United Kingdom ===
- Ely and Newmarket Railway, a defunct railway in England
- Newmarket and Chesterford Railway, a defunct railway in England
- Newmarket railway station (Suffolk), on the Ipswich–Ely line
- Newmarket Road, Cambridge, an arterial road in the east of Cambridge

=== United States ===
- Newmarket station (MBTA), a commuter rail station in Boston, Massachusetts

== Other uses ==
- HMS Newmarket, several ships of the Royal Navy
- The Man of Newmarket, a 1678 English comedy play
- Newmarket (card game), an English card game
- Newmarket Citizens' Band, a Canadian concert band based in Ontario
- Newmarket Public Library (Newmarket, Ontario), in Canada
- Newmarket sausage, a traditional product from the English town of Newmarket, Suffolk

== See also ==
- Neumarkt (disambiguation), several places in German-speaking areas
- New Market (disambiguation)
- Nieuwmarkt, a square in Amsterdam
- Morning coat, once known as a Newmarket coat
- Novi Pazar, a Serbian town whose name means "New Bazaar"
- Novi Pazar, Shumen Province, a Bulgarian town whose name means "New Bazaar"
