= New Market Historic District (New Market, Alabama) =

Historic district in Alabama, United States

- U.S. National Register of Historic Places
- U.S. Historic district
- Alabama Register of Landmarks and Heritage
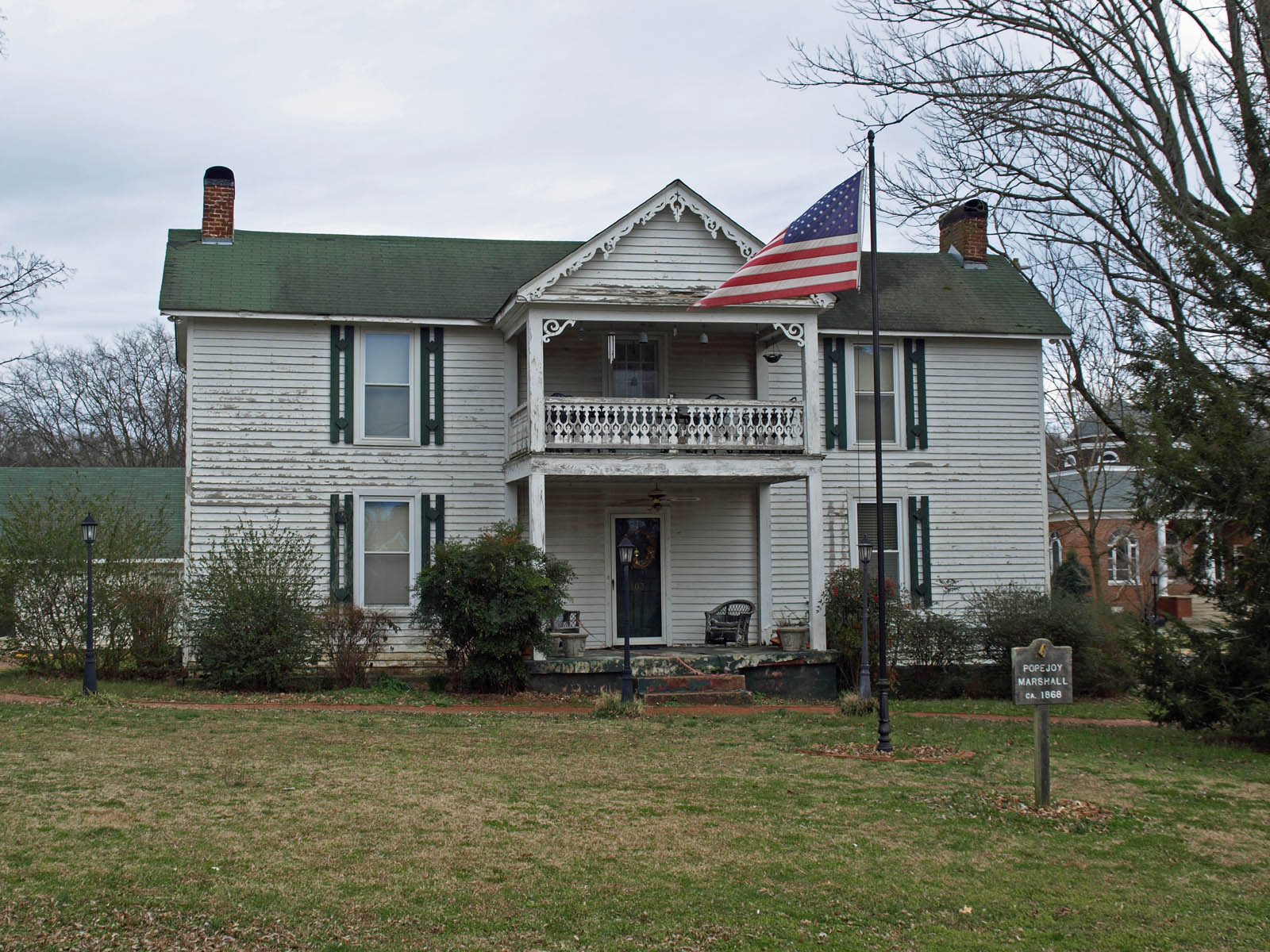
- The Popejoy-Marshall House, built in 1868

- Location within Alabama Location within the United States
- Location: Roughly bounded by Mountain Fork, College St., Davis St., Winchester Rd. to Cochran St., pts. Cochran St. & Cedar St., New Market, Alabama
- Coordinates: 34°54′30″N 86°25′43″W
- Area: 450 acres (180 ha)
- Architectural style: Gothic Revival, Queen Anne
- NRHP reference No.: 04000237

Significant dates
- Added to NRHP: March 31, 2004
- Designated ARLH: July 22, 1991

The New Market Historic District is a historic district in New Market, Alabama. The town was founded in the 1820s as a trade center along the road between Huntsville and Winchester, Tennessee. The town is an unincorporated community and had grown to around 500 residents by the 1850s. Although much of the town was destroyed in the Civil War, some antebellum structures survive, including Classical Revival houses built in 1854 and 1860, and the Whitman-Cobb House built circa 1861.

After the war, the town rebuilt, and a dam was constructed across Mountain Fork Creek to power various mills; it was rebuilt in 1913. The New Market Presbyterian Church built their first building in 1852, which was destroyed in the war. Its second building, constructed in 1884, was destroyed in a tornado in 1885; the current Gothic Revival building was completed in 1888. An Akron Plan New Market United Methodist Church was built in 1923. Many commercial buildings that were constructed in the early 1900s were destroyed in a fire in 1925. Many were rebuilt, including the Classical Revival bank.

The district was listed on the Alabama Register of Landmarks and Heritage in 1991 and the National Register of Historic Places in 2004.
