= New Market Historic District =

New Market Historic District may refer to one of several places listed on the National Register of Historic Places:

- New Market Historic District (New Market, Alabama), listed on the NRHP in Alabama
- New Market Historic District (New Market, Maryland), listed on the NRHP in Maryland
- New Market–Linvale–Snydertown Historic District, listed on the NRHP in New Jersey
- New Market (Philadelphia, Pennsylvania), a National Historic Landmark in Pennsylvania
- New Market Battlefield State Historical Park, site of the Battle of New Market in Virginia
- New Market Historic District (New Market, Virginia), listed on the NRHP in Virginia

== See also ==
- New Market (disambiguation)
