= Stone School (Newmarket, New Hampshire) =

- U.S. National Register of Historic Places
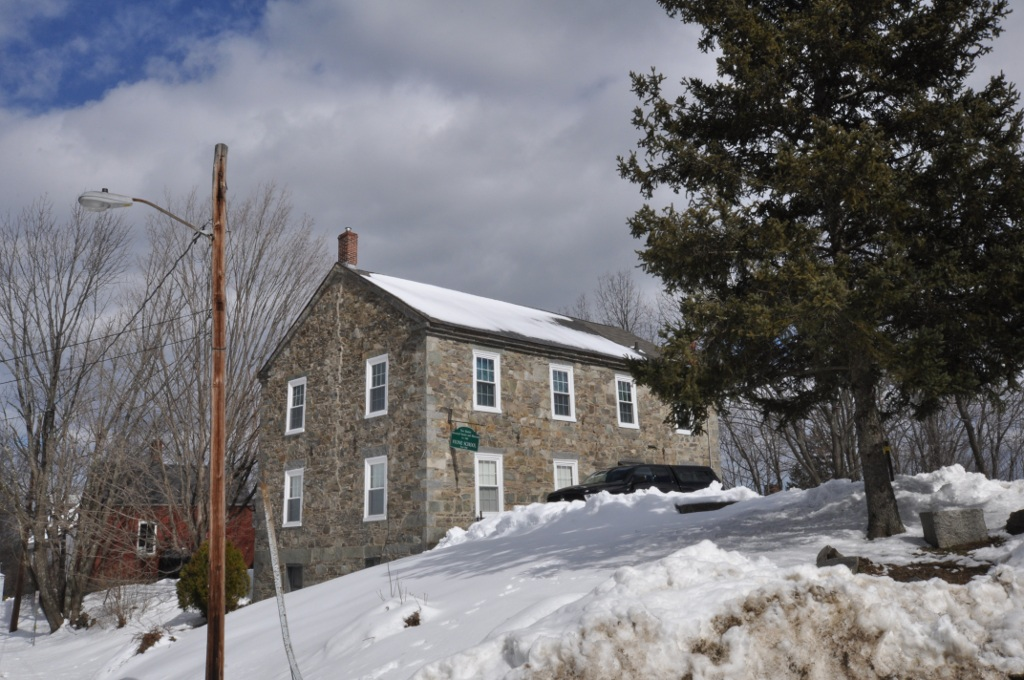

- Location within New Hampshire Location within the United States
- Location: 3 Granite St., Newmarket, New Hampshire
- Coordinates: 43°4′44″N 70°56′18″W
- Area: 1 acre (0.40 ha)
- Built: 1841
- Architect: Multiple
- NRHP reference No.: 78000418
- Added to NRHP: July 12, 1978

The Stone School is a historic school building at 1 Granite Street in Newmarket, New Hampshire. Built in 1841-42, it served the town as a school until 1966, and is a distinctive example of the town's stone architecture. It is now the Stone School Museum, a local history museum. The building was listed on the National Register of Historic Places in 1978.

== Description and history ==
The Stone School stands in a residential area on a steep hill above the commercial downtown of Newmarket, a small mill town on the Lamprey River in southeastern New Hampshire. It is a mainly granite structure, three stories on one side and two on the other, as it is built into the side of a hill. It measures about 35 by 70 feet (11 m × 21 m), with walls of rubble construction, with some shale mixed in with the granite. The stone was quarried at Durham Point. A water table of granite extends around the main floor, its slabs serving as lintels for the partially exposed basement level openings. The building corners have granite quoin blocks, and the main roof line features a two-stage cornice with returns at the gable ends. The interior has wooden floors and plastered walls.

The school was built in 1841-42, its stonework executed by William and Robert Channel, local farmers and stonemasons. Along with the local "Stone Church" and mills, it is a high-quality example of stone architecture in the town. The building was used continuously as a school until 1966, when it was given to the Newmarket Historical Society, which now operates it as a local history museum.

== See also ==
- National Register of Historic Places listings in Rockingham County, New Hampshire
