= Newmarket (CDP), New Hampshire =

Census-designated place in New Hampshire, United States

Newmarket, New Hampshire
- Census-designated place
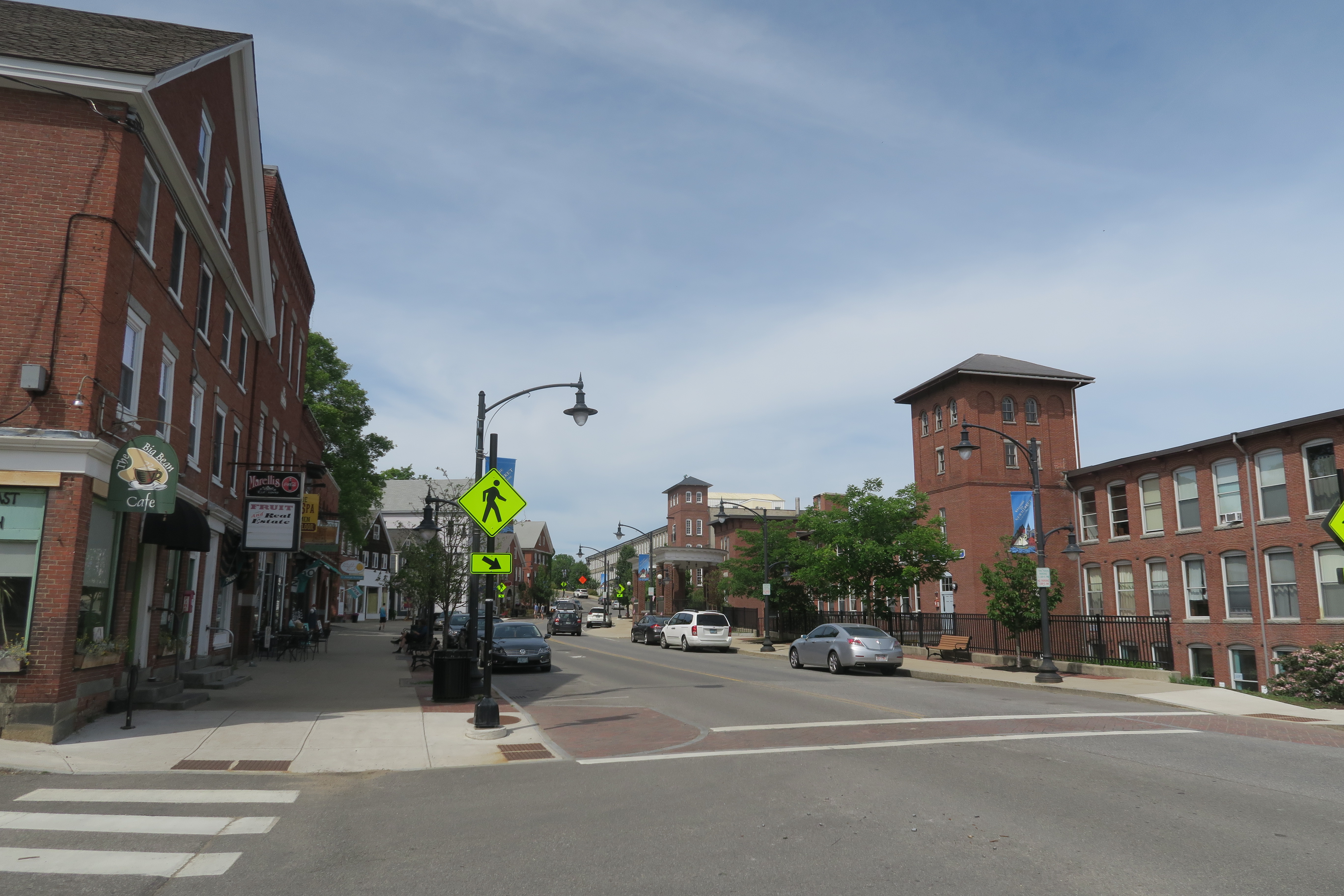
- Main Street

- Location within New Hampshire Location within the United States
- Coordinates: 43°04′30″N 70°56′29″W
- Country: United States
- State: New Hampshire
- County: Rockingham
- Town: Newmarket

Area
  - Total: 2.32 sq mi (6.00 km^{2})
  - Land: 2.25 sq mi (5.83 km^{2})
  - Water: 0.066 sq mi (0.17 km^{2})
- Elevation: 46 ft (14 m)

Population (2020)
  - Total: 5,797
  - Density: 2,574.9/sq mi (994.16/km^{2})
- Time zone: UTC-5 (Eastern (EST))
  - Summer (DST): UTC-4 (EDT)
- ZIP code: 03857
- Area code: 603
- FIPS code: 33-52260
- GNIS feature ID: 2378083

Newmarket is a census-designated place (CDP) and the main village in the town of Newmarket, New Hampshire, United States. The population of the CDP was 5,797 at the 2020 census, out of 9,430 in the entire town.

== Geography ==
The CDP is in the northeastern part of the town of Newmarket, on both sides of the Lamprey River where it falls to tidewater. The CDP is bordered to the north by the town of Durham and to the northwest by the Piscassic River, a tributary of the Lamprey. The southwest border of the CDP follows Hersey Lane to New Hampshire Route 108 (Exeter Road). The eastern border of the CDP follows a power line that runs east of Great Cove Drive and Meadow Drive, then follows Wade Farm Road to the Durham town line.

New Hampshire Route 108 passes through the center of the village, leading north 4 miles (6 km) to Durham and the University of New Hampshire, and south 8 miles (13 km) to Exeter. Route 152 leads west 9 miles (14 km) to Nottingham.

According to the U.S. Census Bureau, the Newmarket CDP has a total area of 2.3 square miles (6.0 km^{2}), of which 2.2 square miles (5.8 km^{2}) are land and 0.1 square miles (0.2 km^{2}), or 2.80%, are water. The Lamprey River crosses the CDP from north to south, and the 19th-century Newmarket Manufacturing Company mill complex is located on the river at its falls above the head of tide. The center of the CDP is listed on the National Register of Historic Places as the Newmarket Industrial and Commercial Historic District.

== Demographics ==
Historical population
Census	Pop.	Note	%±
1950	2,172		—
1960	2,745		26.4%
1970	2,645		−3.6%
1980	3,749		41.7%
1990	4,917		31.2%
2000	5,124		4.2%
2010	5,297		3.4%
2020	5,797		9.4%
U.S. Decennial Census

As of the census of 2010, there were 5,297 people, 2,400 households, and 1,178 families residing in the CDP. There were 2,594 housing units, of which 194, or 7.5%, were vacant. The racial makeup of the CDP was 91.2% white, 1.3% African American, 0.3% Native American, 4.0% Asian, 0.1% Pacific Islander, 0.8% some other race, and 2.3% from two or more races. 2.9% of the population were Hispanic or Latino of any race.

Of the 2,400 households in the CDP, 24.5% had children under the age of 18 living with them, 35.1% were headed by married couples living together, 9.7% had a female householder with no husband present, and 50.9% were non-families. 31.3% of all households were made up of individuals, and 6.0% were someone living alone who was 65 years of age or older. The average household size was 2.21, and the average family size was 2.82.

18.0% of residents in the CDP were under the age of 18, 17.6% were from age 18 to 24, 32.2% were from 25 to 44, 24.5% were from 45 to 64, and 7.7% were 65 years of age or older. The median age was 31.6 years. For every 100 females, there were 98.1 males. For every 100 females age 18 and over, there were 96.9 males.

For the period 2011–15, the estimated median annual income for a household was $53,025, and the median income for a family was $73,990. The per capita income for the CDP was $28,830. 12.0% of the population and 3.5% of families were below the poverty line, along with 5.3% of people under the age of 18 and 6.8% of people 65 or older.
