= New Market Presbyterian Church =

New Market Presbyterian Church may refer to:

- New Market Presbyterian Church (New Market, Alabama), listed on the National Register of Historic Places in Madison County, Alabama
- New Market Presbyterian Church (New Market, Tennessee), listed on the National Register of Historic Places in Jefferson County, Tennessee
