= Newmarket Junior-Senior High School =

High school in New Hampshire, United States

Coordinates: 43°04′29″N 70°56′44″W

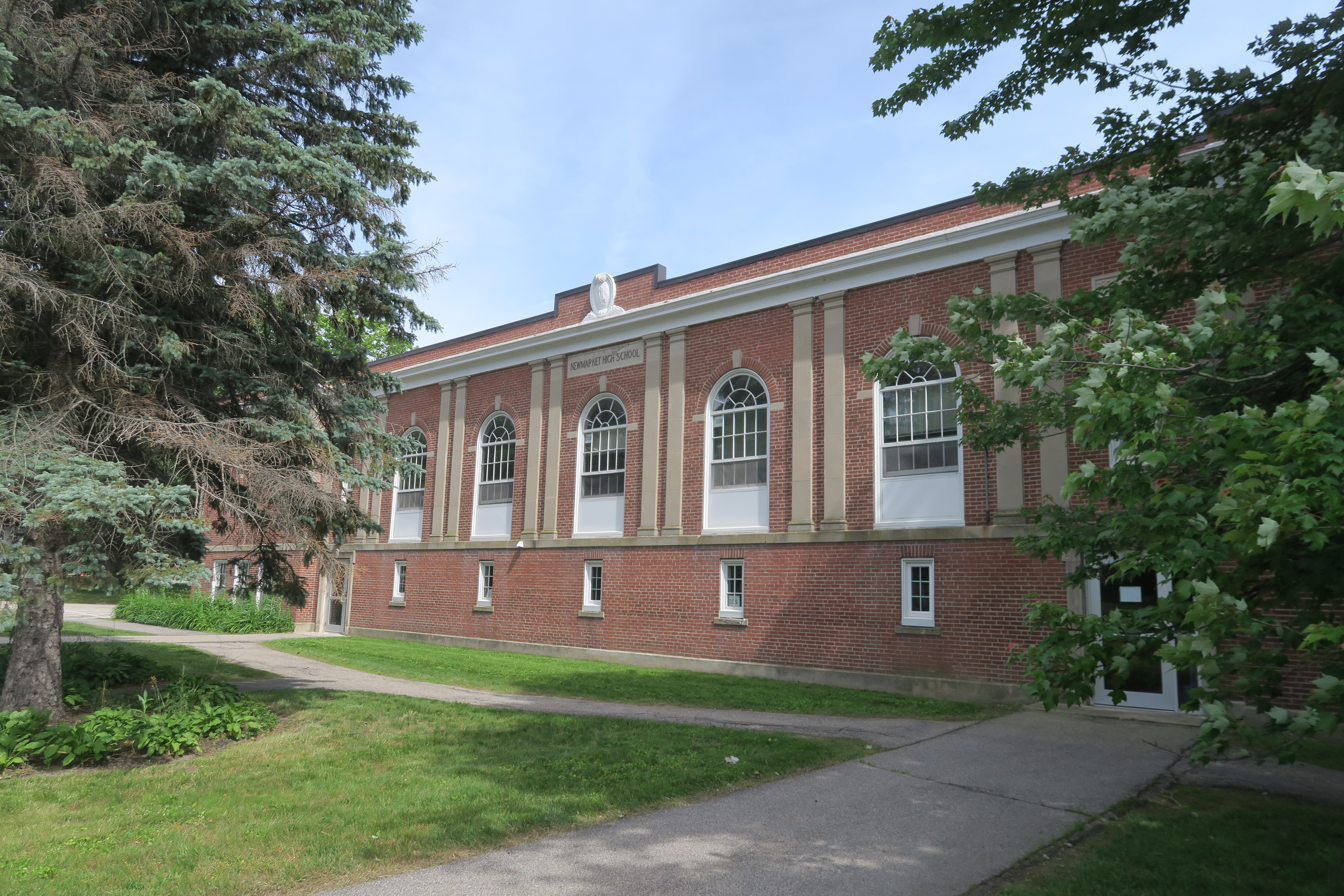

Location
- 213 South Main Street; Newmarket, (Rockingham County), New Hampshire 03857; United States

Information
- Type: Public high school
- Principal: Andrew Korman
- Staff: 28.10 (FTE)
- Enrollment: 280 (2022-23)
- Student to teacher ratio: 9.61
- Colors: Red and black
- Nickname: Mules

Newmarket Junior-Senior High School is the public high school and middle school for the town of Newmarket, Rockingham County, New Hampshire.

The teacher to student ratio is 1:13 due to the small number of students.

In the 2005–2006 school year the students did as well as expected on the NHEIAP exams ranking 26th out of 75 districts in math and 23rd of 75 in reading.

The Newmarket High school athletics teams compete in NHIAA Division IV. The Mules have won 7 state championships dating back to 2019 including 3 in baseball (2019, 2021, & 2023), 1 in boys basketball (2020), 2 in girls soccer (2021 & 2022), and 1 in boys soccer (2019). The school mascot is the mule. The school colors are red and black. Rivals include Portmouth Christian Academy and Epping High School.

In 2015, U.S. News & World Report ranked the Newmarket High School as number nine in the state.

The current principal is Andrew Korman.
