= Drummine Farm =

Historic house in Maryland, United States

- U.S. National Register of Historic Places
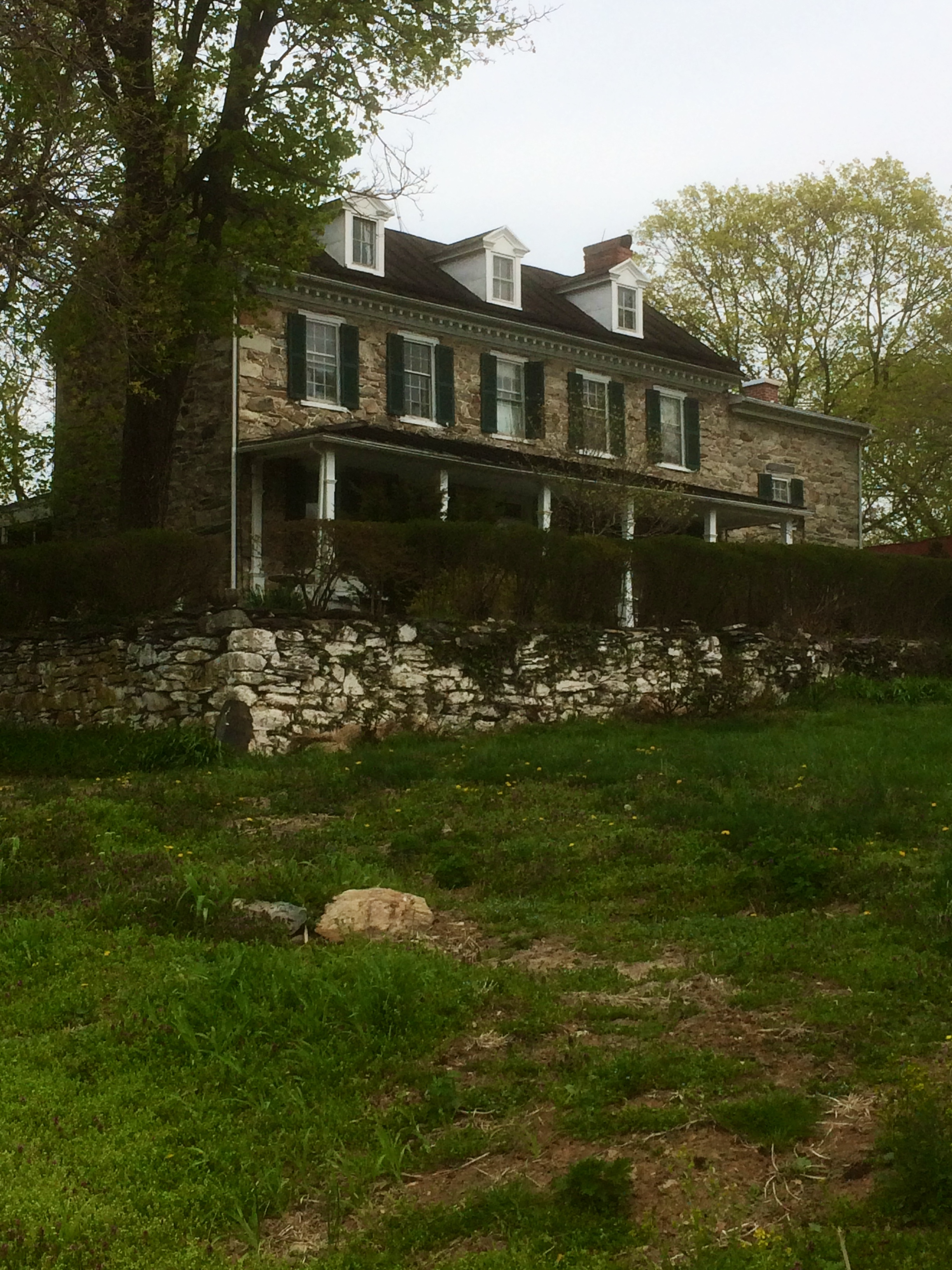
- The main house is a 1790 gable-roofed 2 1/2 story house constructed of uncoursed fieldstone.

- Location within Maryland Location within the United States
- Coordinates: 39°25′39″N 77°14′43″W
- Area: 10 acres (4.0 ha)
- Built: 1772
- NRHP reference No.: 86003543
- Added to NRHP: January 8, 1987

The Drummine Farm is a historic home and farm complex located at New Market, Frederick County, Maryland, United States. The main house was constructed about 1790 and is a 2 1/2-story structure of uncoursed fieldstone. The house retains Georgian stylistic influences in exterior and interior decorative detailing.

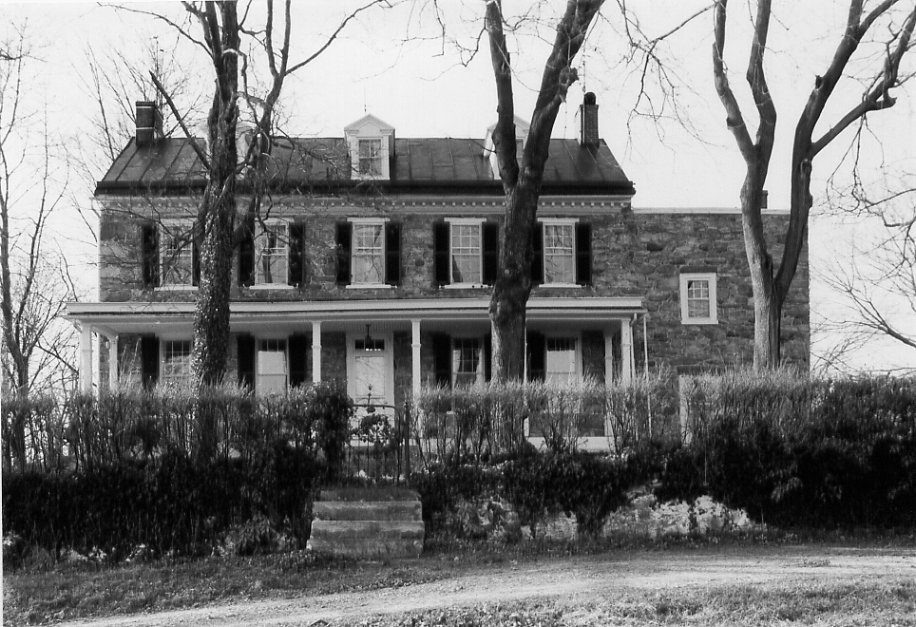
The main house at Drummine Farm, a 1790 gable-roofed 2 1/2 story house constructed of uncoursed fieldstone.

The farm complex structures include a stone tenant house dated 1816, and four additional fieldstone buildings from the early 19th century: a smokehouse, a water storage house, a garden outhouse, and a large bank barn.

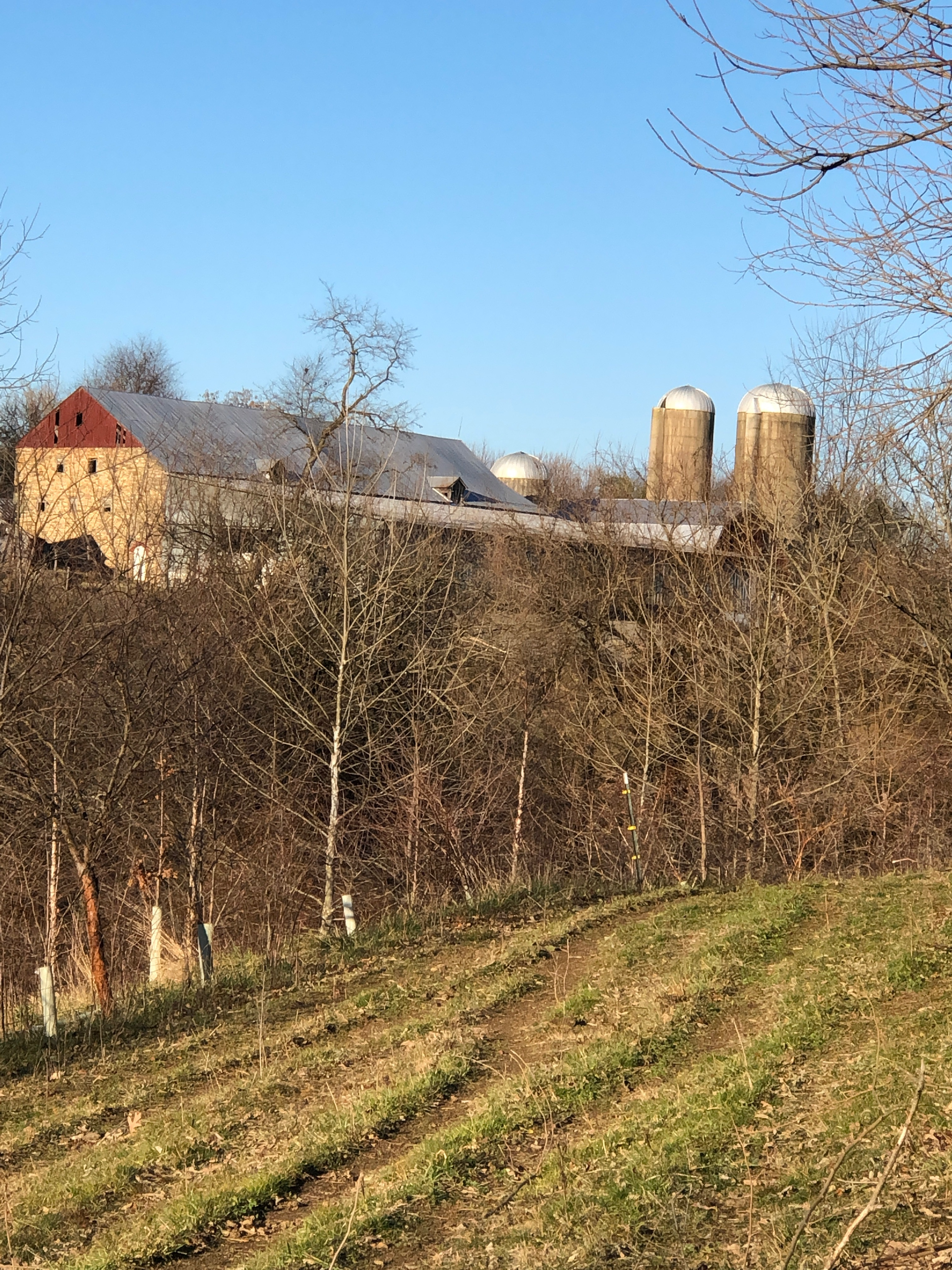
The bank barn and silos at Drummine Farm

Wooden farm buildings include a calf shed and a wagon shed with corn cribs from the late 19th century, a dairy barn with three cement stave silos from the 1930s, several sheds and garages, and a large pole barn.

The Drummine Farm was listed on the National Register of Historic Places in 1987.
