= New Market Township =

New Market Township may refer to:

- New Market Township, Scott County, Minnesota
- New Market Township, Randolph County, North Carolina
- New Market Township, Highland County, Ohio

== See also ==
- New Market (disambiguation)
