= Neumarkt =

Neumarkt (German for "new market") may refer to several places:

== Austria ==
- Neumarkt am Wallersee, in Salzburg
- Neumarkt an der Raab, in the Jennersdorf District, Burgenland
- Neumarkt an der Ybbs, in Lower Austria
- Neumarkt im Hausruckkreis, in the Hausruckviertel, Upper Austria
- Neumarkt im Mühlkreis, in the Mühlviertel, Upper Austria
- Neumarkt in Steiermark, in Styria

== Czech Republic ==
- Neumarkt, the German name of Úterý in Plzeň

== Germany ==
- Cologne Neumarkt, location of the Neumarkt station, one of the major squares in Cologne, North Rhine-Westphalia
- Dresden Neumarkt, a historically important square in Dresden, Saxony
- Neumarkt (district), in Bavaria
- Neumarkt in der Oberpfalz, in Bavaria
- Neumarkt-Sankt Veit, in Bavaria

== Italy ==
- Neumarkt, South Tyrol, a municipality in South Tyrol

== Poland ==
- Neumarkt am Dohnst, the German name of Nowy Targ in Lesser Poland
- Neumarkt in Schlesien, the German name of Środa Śląska in Lower Silesia

== Romania ==
- Neumarkt am Mieresch, the German name of Târgu Mureș
- Neumarkt, the German name of Negreni, Cluj

== Switzerland ==
- Neumarkt, Zürich, an area and street in Zürich
- Theater am Neumarkt, situated in Zürich

== See also ==
- Nieuwmarkt, a square in the centre of Amsterdam
- Newmarket (disambiguation) and New Market (disambiguation)
