= Mount Paran Cemetery =

Cemetery in New Market, Alabama, USA

- Interactive map of Mount Paran Cemetery

Details
- Location: New Market, Alabama
- Country: United States
- Coordinates: 34°55.024′N 86°25.547′W
- Size: 3.77 acres (0.0153 km^{2})
- No. of graves: ~400
- Find a Grave: Mount Paran Cemetery

Mount Paran Cemetery is a historic cemetery in New Market, Alabama that was founded in the early 1800s.The cemetery contains around 400 graves, including those of early Madison County pioneers, soldiers from the Revolutionary War, War of 1812, and Civil War, and a large number of slaves. The land was also used as a campground by both the local Cherokee people and American soldiers; the site received a historic marker in 1989 labelling it the Mount Paran Campground and Cemetery. It was added to the Alabama Register of Landmarks and Heritage's Historic Preservation Map in December 2019.

== History ==
Mount Paran Cemetery originated as a campground in early Madison County, prior to the separation of the Alabama Territory from the Mississippi Territory. The campground was used by both Cumberland Presbyterian pioneers and the local Cherokee; the land was also used by the American military as a muster ground under Captain John Williams. The earliest surviving gravestone in the area is dated 1826, but the cemetery may have been established as early as 1806, two years before the establishment of Madison County on December 13, 1808.

In 1842, the six acres of land containing the cemetery and campground were given to Mount Paran Presbyterian Church of New Market by Samuel Davis, a Revolutionary War veteran. Mount Paran Cemetery remained under the church's ownership until 1906, when the church dissolved and its members moved to neighboring congregations. After being abandoned by the church, the cemetery became known colloquially as "Graveyard Hill."

Illegal logging of nearby cedar trees in 1966 damaged many of Mount Paran Cemetery's box graves and headstones. In 1989 the Alabama Historical Association installed a historic marker at the site commemorating the Mount Paran Campground and Cemetery.

== Burials ==
Mount Paran Cemetery contains approximately 400 graves, though, at the time of its historic marker's installation, only 135 were marked. Those interred in the cemetery include members of Madison County's earliest families; two known inhabitants are Isaac Criner and John Miller. The cemetery also holds graves for soldiers from three American wars: three from the Revolutionary War, including Samuel Davis, who initially bequeathed the cemetery's land to Mount Paran Presbyterian Church of New Market, and Moses Poor; six from the War of 1812; and upwards of twenty from the Civil War.

The cemetery was divided in the past into white and black sections. Research in 2014 indicated the cemetery may contain the graves of 100 to 200 slaves.

== Restoration efforts ==
In October 2014, University of Alabama in Huntsville student and history major Patricia Cates began a restoration project on the cemetery. After encountering the cemetery during a walk that August, Cates, reached out to Dr. John Kvach, director of UAH's Center for Public History, and Mount Paran Cemetery's board of directors to organize cleaning for the cemetery. The project enlisted over 100 students from local Buckhorn High School to engage in community service by continually maintaining the site. Cates also reached out to local historians to track down unmarked graves and catalog those interred there. The cleanup program continued annually at least as far as 2017.
