= Henry Nelson House =

Historic house in Maryland, United States

- U.S. National Register of Historic Places
- Location within Maryland Location within the United States
- Location: 10822 Gas House Pike, New Market, Maryland
- Coordinates: 39°25′59″N 77°17′19″W
- Area: 66 acres (27 ha)
- Built: 1800
- NRHP reference No.: 80001811
- Added to NRHP: December 4, 1980

The Henry Nelson House is a historic home and farm complex located at New Market, Frederick County, Maryland, United States. It is a 2 1/2-story, coursed stone rubble house built in about 1800, with a gable roof, and a corbeled brick cornice. Outbuildings include a barn, log springhouse, and a small log house.

The Henry Nelson House was listed on the National Register of Historic Places in 1980.
