= The Stone Church =

Coordinates: 43°04′44″N 70°56′17″W

The Stone Church is a live music venue in Newmarket, New Hampshire. In operation since 1970, the Stone Church offers local food, a handpicked selection of local and craft beers, and local musical performances, along with national touring acts. The venue is located at 5 Granite Street, atop Zion Hill in Newmarket. It features parking for visitors and an electric vehicle charging station.

The Church has had a rather eclectic past, even during its days as a church for Newmarket's mill workers, when the town housed a mill that at one time held more looms in its gigantic factory than any other building in the world. Built in 1832, the church first served as a Universalist meeting house, then 20 years later as a Unitarian meeting house. The Catholics bought the church in 1865, retaining ownership until approximately the turn of the 20th century when they sold it. The church then acted alternately as a VFW hall, a roller-skating rink, and a shoe-assembly plant, the Newmarket Heel Company, which suffered a major fire in 1968.

In 1970, two former University of New Hampshire students (Rod Philbrick and John Williamson) and a third person, not at UNH (Arnet Taylor), purchased the burnt-out church and turned it into a venue for live music. From then on, the Stone Church served as a home for local musicians and touring acts such as Phish, Aerosmith, Bonnie Raitt, Parliament, Patty Larkin, Béla Fleck, David Grisman Quintet, Joan Osborne, Dirty Dozen Brass Band, The Radiators, Guster, moe., John Butler Trio, John Scofield, Soulive, Grace Potter and the Nocturnals, and local acts such as Percy Hill, Say Zuzu, Scissorfight, Thanks to Gravity, Bill Morrissey, and Truffle.

== Gallery ==
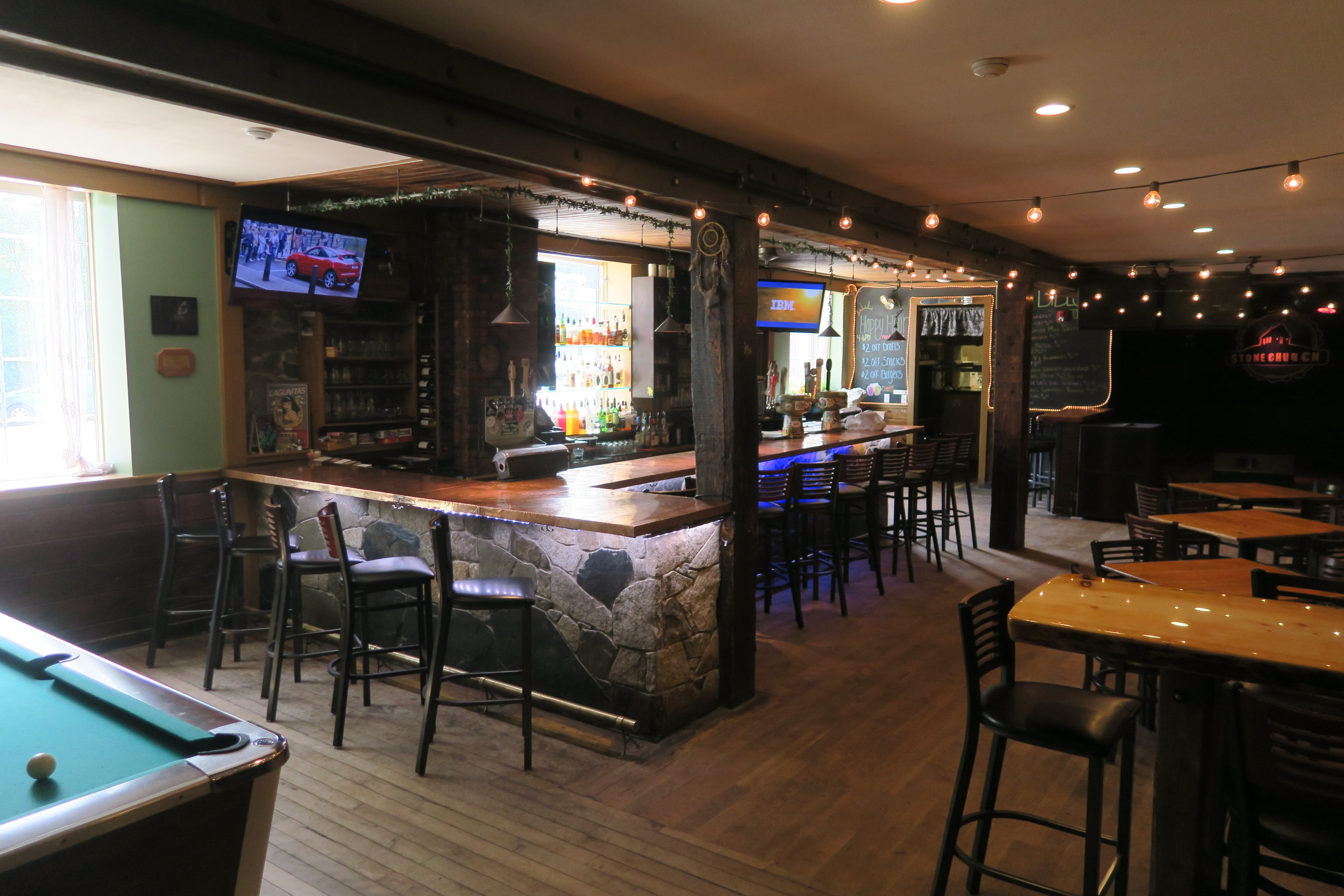

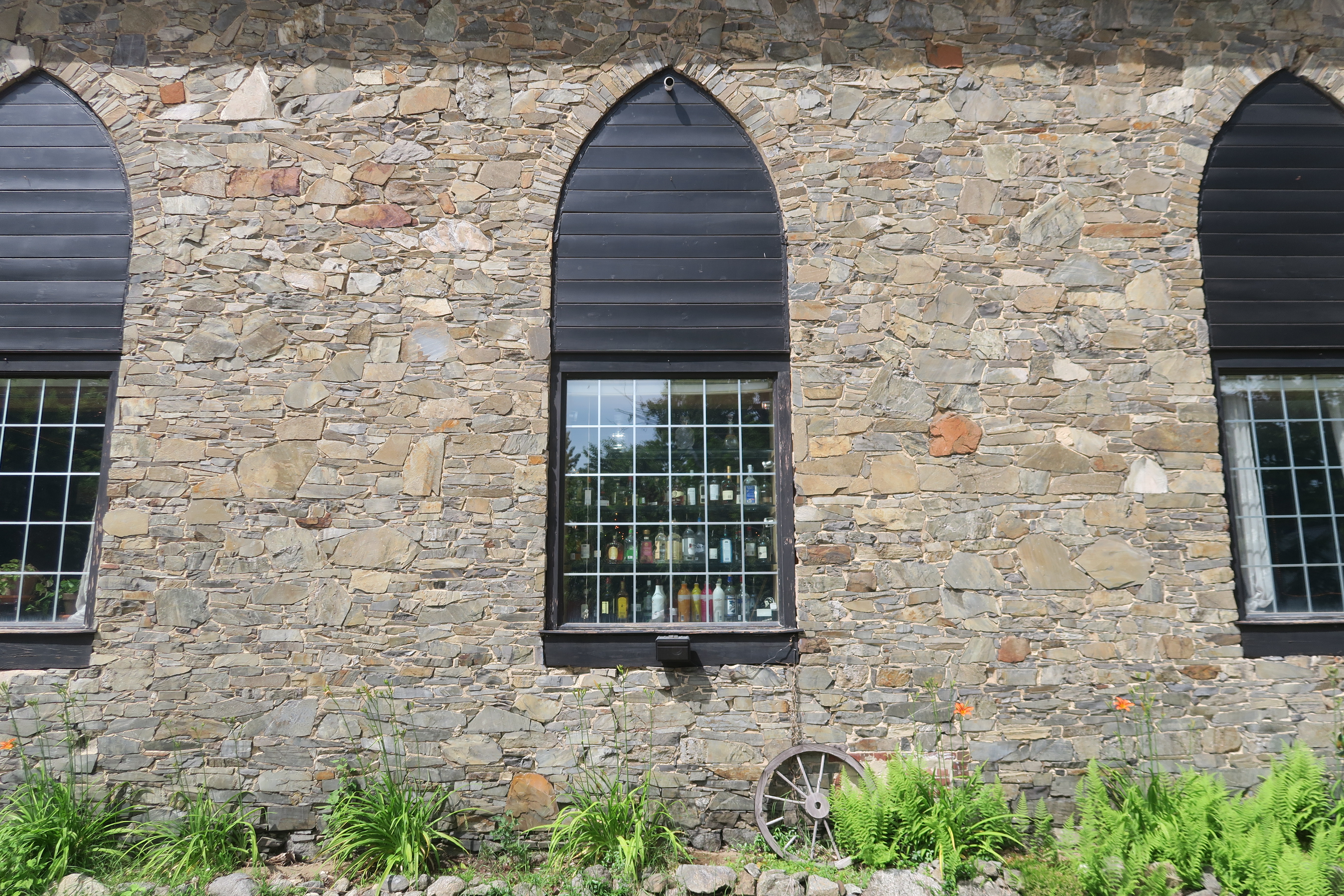

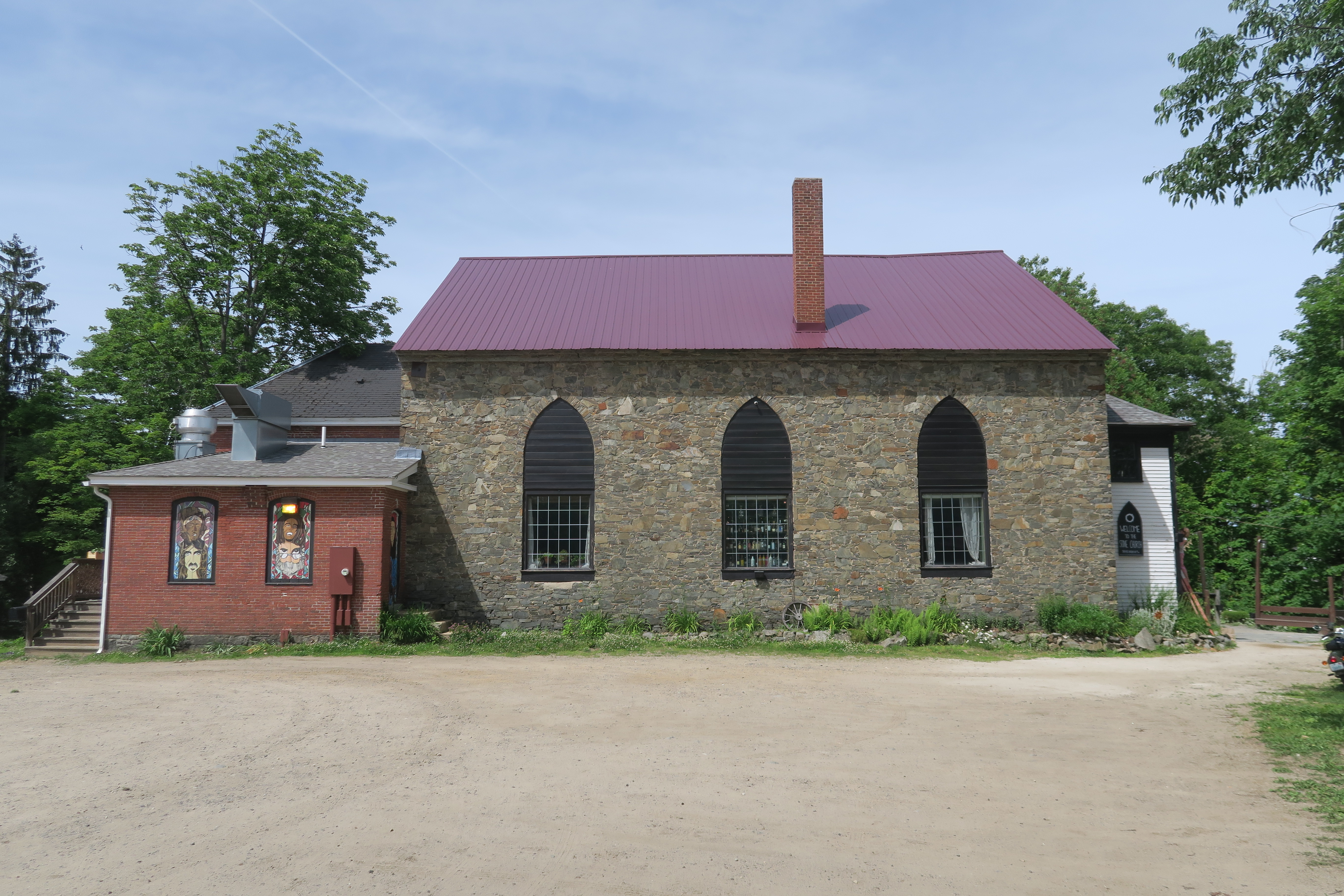
