= Say Zuzu =

American alternative country band

Say ZuZu
- Origin: Newmarket, New Hampshire, United States
- Genre: Alternative country
- Years active: 1992–2003; 2019-present
- Label: Strolling Bones Records
- Members: Jon Nolan; Cliff Murphy; Jon Pistey; Tim Nylander; Steve Ruhm
- Past members: Mark Wentworth; James Nolan

Say ZuZu is an alternative country band originally based in Newmarket, New Hampshire. The group was formed in 1992 by brothers Jon and James Nolan, and their longtime friend Cliff Murphy. Though they achieved little commercial success in the United States, the band developed a strong following in Italy where they toured for several years.

== Career ==
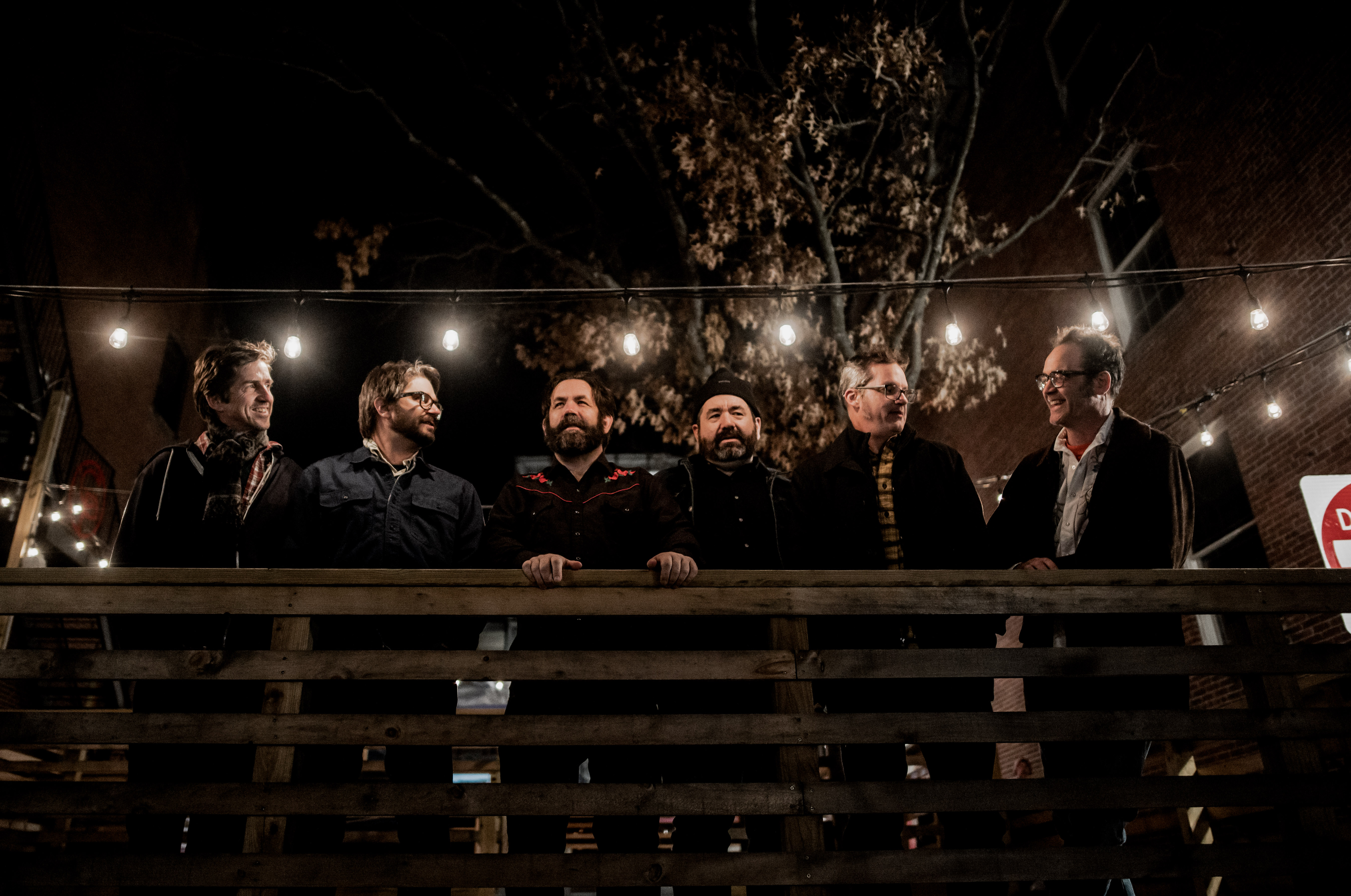
Say ZuZu 2021

Say ZuZu "got its start on the Seacoast as a group of boys playing guitars in the bedroom of a little red Cape Cod house in Durham in 1988." Those three boys were Jon and James Nolan and Cliff Murphy. The band originally chose the name ZuZu's Petals, after a scene from the movie It's a Wonderful Life; however, after discovering that several other bands out there had already chosen that name, they decided on "Say ZuZu," which references an old 1930s Nabisco ad.

The band released the album, Highway Signs and Driving Songs, in 1995, surprisingly, without the help of a record label. The album was a roots-rock fusion of country, rock, and folk. Despite its critical success, the album did little for the band in the United States. In 1997, however, it ended up in the hands of Paolo Caru, an influential rock critic in Italy, who became an instant fan. Caru's influence shot the band to relative success in Italy and they quickly began an international tour, beginning in Canzo. The band's next album, Take These Turns, was released in 1997 and became a very successful follow up to Highway Signs and Driving Songs.

In 1998, Say ZuZu released their most critically acclaimed album to date, Bull. The release of Bull signaled a more mature Say ZuZu than the band that had come on the scene in 1995, and earned them several nods from record companies as well as more commercial success in the US. The next year, the band released a live album entitled Live.

After much touring, bassist James Nolan decided it was in his best interest to leave the band in pursuit of a graduate degree in international relations. He and drummer Steve Ruhm left the band in 2001 under good terms. The band forged on, and Jon Pistey and Tim Nylander joined the group on bass and drums respectively. In 2002, they released their studio album, Every Mile. The band toured behind the album, during which time Live in Germany was recorded prior to the group deciding to retire.

In 2021, the band reunited and signed with Athens, GA, based label, Strolling Bones Records. In 2022 they returned to the world of Americana music with Here Again: A Retrospective (1994-2002), a roadmap to their 5 studio albums recorded from 1994-2002.

"No Time to Lose", the band's first album of new material in over twenty years, will be released in March 2023 on Strolling Bones Records.

Cliff Murphy is a graduate of Brown University with a PhD in American Music and was the state ethnomusicologist for the State of Maryland and later worked for the National Endowment for the Arts as its NEA Director of Folk and Traditional Arts is now the Director of the Smithsonian Center for Folklife and Cultural Heritage Museum in Washington, DC. He is a boxing and baseball aficionado and is partial to the Willy Wonka Candy brands of Runts and Nerds.

== Members ==
- Cliff Murphy - vocals, guitar, banjo, harmonica
- Jon Nolan - vocals, guitar, pedal steel, lap steel
- Jon Pistey - bass guitar, guitar
- Tim Nylander - drums, keyboards
- Steve Ruhm - drums, mandolin, vocals

== Discography ==
- 1992: Say ZuZu to the Grocerman
- 1993: Tribal Moans
- 1994: Say ZuZu
- 1995: Highway Signs and Driving Songs
- 1997: Take These Turns
- 1998: Bull
- 1999: Live
- 2002: Every Mile
- 2004: Live in Germany
- 2022: Here Again: A Retrospective (1994-2002)
- 2023: No Time to Lose
