= Portsmouth Christian Academy =

Coordinates: 43°9′35″N 70°51′21″W

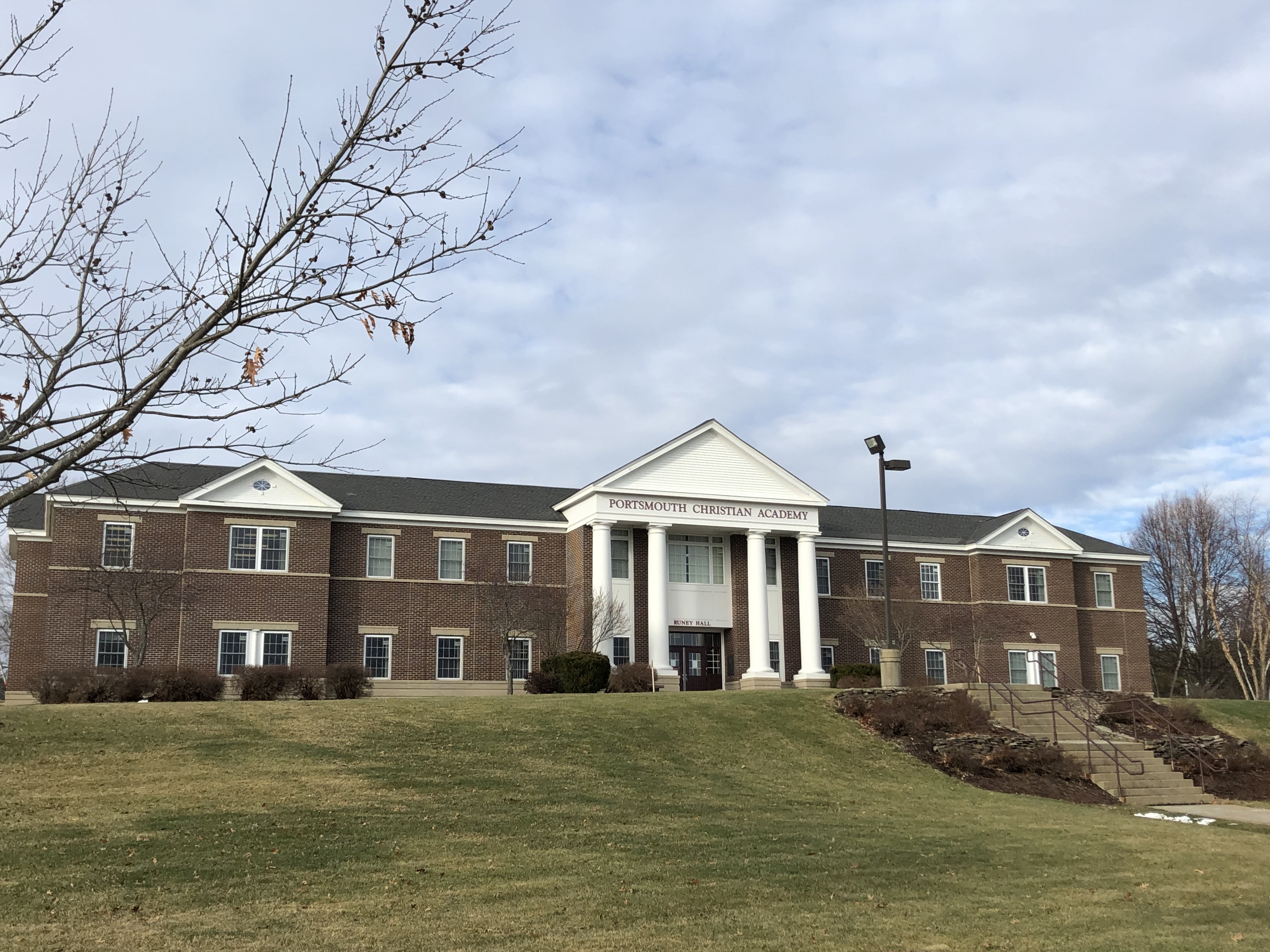

Location
- 20 Seaborne Drive; Dover, New Hampshire 03820; United States

Information
- Type: Private
- Founded: 1979
- Head of school: Mike Runey
- Enrollment: 663
- Colors: Maroon, White
- Athletics: Basketball, soccer, track and field, baseball, softball, cross country, volleyball
- Athletics conference: NHIAA Division 4
- Mascot: Eagle
- Website: www.pcaschool.org

Portsmouth Christian Academy (PCA) is a private non-denominational Christian school in Dover, New Hampshire, United States. It is the largest non-denominational Christian school in New England and is located on a 50-acre (20 ha) riverfront campus in Dover. The school is divided into four sections: Preschool (PCAP), Lower School (K-5), Middle School (6-8) and Upper School (9-12). The Upper School is designed as a college preparatory program.

== History ==
PCA was founded in 1979 by Pastor Peter and Mrs. Bettie Miller and was originally called Bethel Christian Academy (BCA). Based in Portsmouth, New Hampshire, BCA served kindergarten through eighth grades.

In 1992, under the new leadership of then-Headmaster Dennis Runey, the school changed its name to Portsmouth Christian Academy, and by 1995 expanded to include a high school. Jonathan Tymann was hired as the first Principal in 1996 and the first alumnus of PCA graduated in 1997. The first full graduating class was in 1998. In 1999, PCA moved to the current Dover campus and added the gym and Upper School facilities. The new facilities in Dover also provided a venue for a preschool; the first PCAP classes joined the PCA family in the fall of that year.

== Curriculum ==
Portsmouth Christian Academy offers a faith-based education. The school's philosophy of education is based on the classical trivium.

=== Dual enrollment and Advanced Placement ===
PCA offers dual enrollment with Southern New Hampshire University. This allows part-time students to earn college credit and high school credit simultaneously. In addition, students may enroll in Advanced Placement courses and take the AP test to earn college credit, which gives a great way to get ahead in college.

=== Diploma options ===
PCA students choose from several tracks with result in several diploma options. These include a General Education Diploma, STEM Diploma, Fine Arts Diploma, or a Diploma of Distinction, which recognizes rigorous academic work.

== Student body ==
PCA enrolls 600+ students from New Hampshire, Maine, and Massachusetts.

== Extracurricular activities ==
=== Athletics ===
PCA is a Division IV member of the New Hampshire Interscholastic Athletic Association (NHIAA).
