= Novi Pazar (disambiguation) =

Novi Pazar may refer to:

- Novi Pazar, town in Serbia
- Novi Pazar, Shumen Province, town in Bulgaria
- Novi Pazar, Kardzhali Province, village in Bulgaria
