= New Market United Methodist Church =

Historic church in Alabama, United States

- U.S. National Register of Historic Places
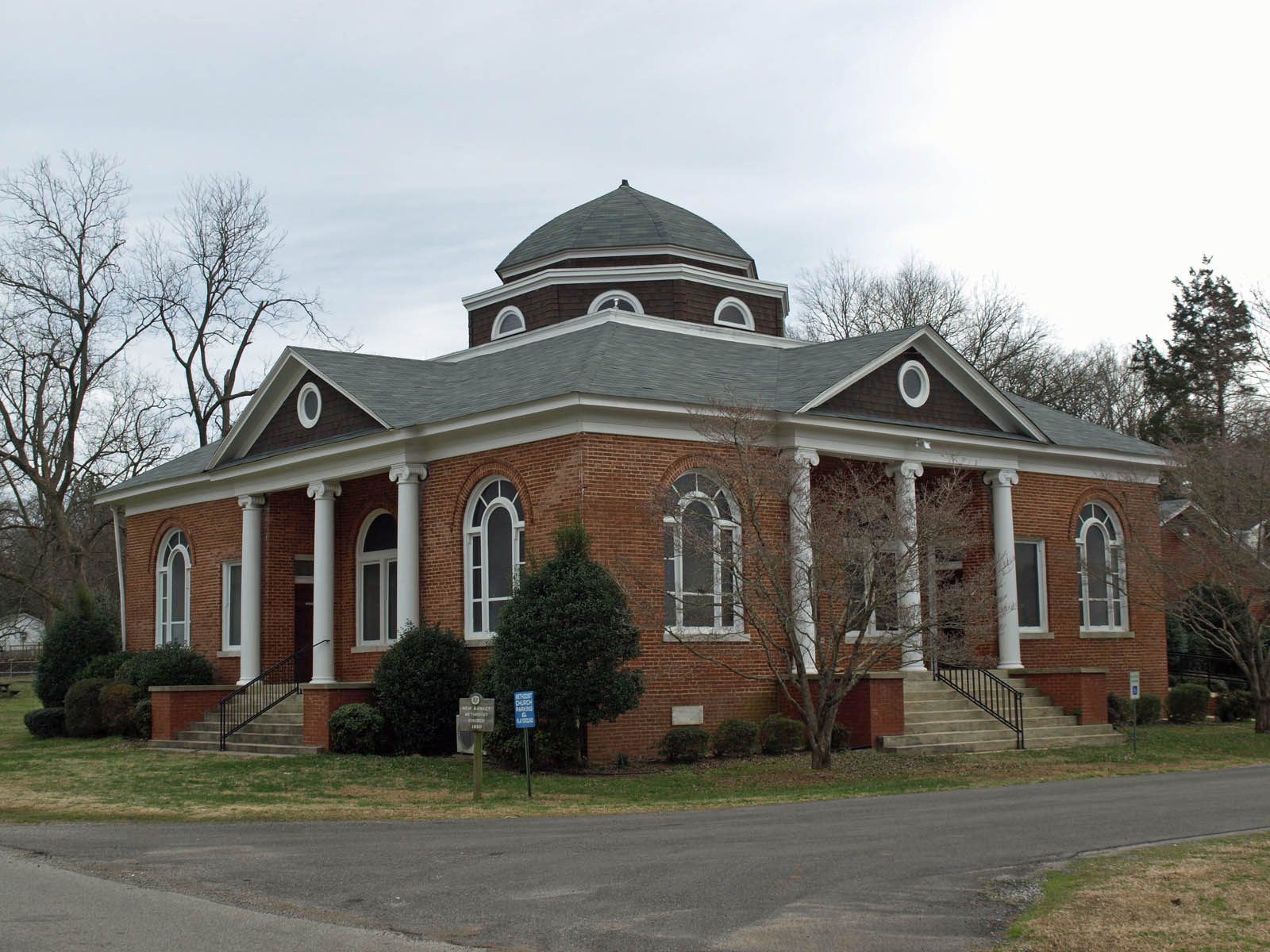
- The church in February 2012

- Location within Alabama Location within the United States
- Location: 310 Hurricane Rd., New Market, Alabama
- Coordinates: 34°54′26″N 86°25′36″W
- Area: 2 acres (0.81 ha)
- Built: 1921
- Architect: Frank Estes
- Architectural style: Colonial Revival
- Website: www.newmarketumc.net
- NRHP reference No.: 90000919
- Added to NRHP: June 14, 1990

New Market United Methodist Church is a historic church at 310 Hurricane Road in New Market, Alabama, United States. It was built in 1921 and added to the National Register of Historic Places in 1990.

In 1920, a white frame church was demolished and the current circular brick church was constructed. The architect was Frank Estes, although the work was completed by another contractor. The church's architecture reflects two key influences: Andre Palladio's 16th-century Villa Capra, and the "Akron Plan," which was created in the late 1800s by the Methodist Church of Ohio. The Palladium Italian Renaissance influence is evident in the central dome and in the main north and east facades. The influence of the "Akron Plan," by contrast, can be seen in the quarter-circular auditorium surrounded by four Sunday school alcoves.

The church's current pastor is Christy Noren-Hentz. She pursued a degree in Youth Ministry and Education at Greenville College, Illinois, and later completed a degree at Princeton Theological Seminary. She was also ordained as a deacon of the Free Methodist Church.
