= Newmarket Industrial and Commercial Historic District =

Historic district in New Hampshire, United States

- U.S. National Register of Historic Places
- U.S. Historic district
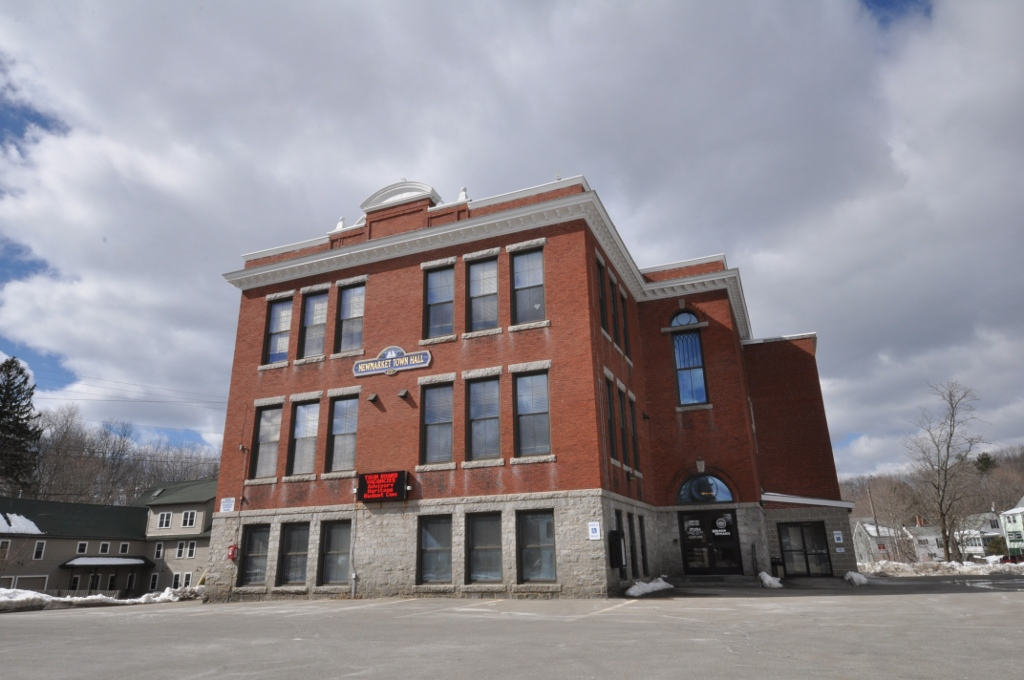
- Newmarket Town Hall

- Location within New Hampshire Location within the United States
- Location: NH 108, Newmarket, New Hampshire
- Coordinates: 43°4′47″N 70°56′14″W
- Area: 10 acres (4.0 ha)
- Architectural style: Greek Revival, Late Victorian, Federal
- NRHP reference No.: 80000302
- Added to NRHP: December 1, 1980

The Newmarket Industrial and Commercial Historic District encompasses the heart of a distinctive 19th century mill town, Newmarket, New Hampshire. Its mill complex is regionally distinctive for its extensive use of stone from an early date, and the town is relatively well-preserved due to a significant economic decline after the mills closed in 1920. The district was listed on the National Register of Historic Places in 1980. The Stone School, listed in 1978, is a contributing resource.

== Description and history ==
The town of Newmarket was incorporated in 1737, and was initially a shipping center, based on the Lamprey River, a tributary of the Piscataqua River. In the early 19th century, the power of the Lamprey River was harnessed by textile manufacturing businesses, which fueled the community's growth into the early 20th century. That industry then declined, leaving a distinctive architectural legacy in New Hampshire's Seacoast Region. The most notable aspects of the town's buildings is the use of stone, in contrast to other mill towns of southern New England, which predominantly used brick. The use of stone was not limited to the mills themselves: the historic district also has examples of stone houses, churches, and schools.

The historic district extends along Main Street (New Hampshire Route 108) between Gerry Street and Elm Street, Exeter between Gerry and Main, Nichols and Central streets, and a number of smaller adjacent streets between Main Street and Granite and Spring streets. Its principal eastern boundary is the Lamprey River, along which the surviving mill buildings are arrayed. Commercial buildings are mainly located across Main Street from the mills, with residential housing on side streets. A cluster of town buildings and a church are located at the junction of South Main Street and Beech Street Extension. The town hall is a handsome Greek Revival brick building constructed in 1847.

== See also ==
- National Register of Historic Places listings in Rockingham County, New Hampshire
