= New Market, Maryland =

- Town
- Town of New Market
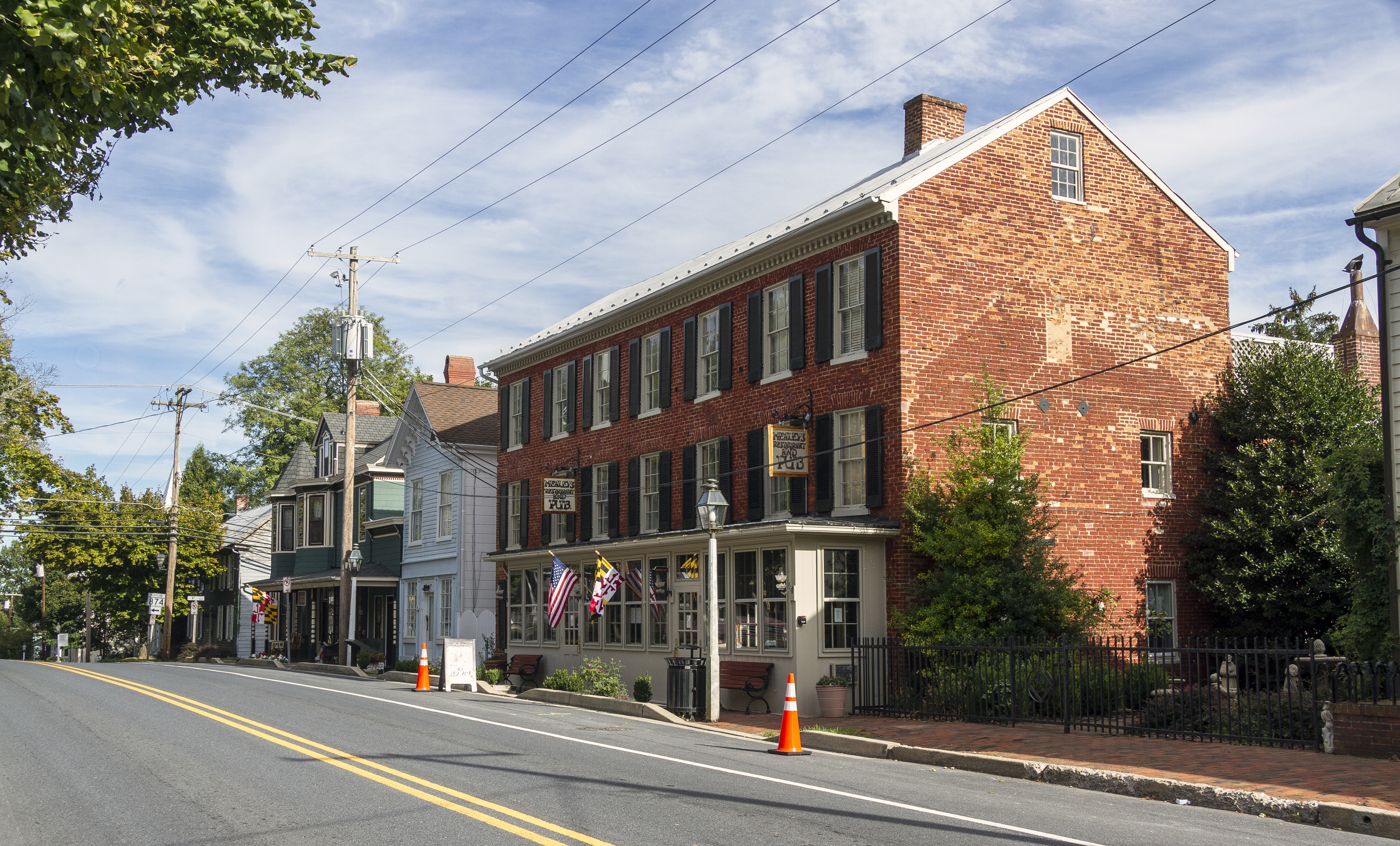

- Flag Logo

- Location of New Market, Maryland
- Coordinates: 39°23′1″N 77°16′24″W
- Country: United States
- State: Maryland
- County: Frederick
- Incorporated: 1878

Area
  - Total: 1.63 sq mi (4.21 km^{2})
  - Land: 1.62 sq mi (4.20 km^{2})
  - Water: 0 sq mi (0.00 km^{2})
- Elevation: 545 ft (166 m)

Population (2020)
  - Total: 1,525
  - Density: 939.6/sq mi (362.79/km^{2})
- Time zone: UTC-5 (Eastern (EST))
  - Summer (DST): UTC-4 (EDT)
- ZIP code: 21774
- Area codes: 301, 240
- FIPS code: 24-55650
- GNIS feature ID: 2391325
- Website: www.townofnewmarket.org

New Market is a town in Frederick County, Maryland, United States. The population was 1,525 at the 2020 census. The town bills itself as the "Antiques capital of Maryland".

== Geography ==
According to the United States Census Bureau, the town has a total area of 0.80 square miles (2.07 km^{2}), all land.

== History ==
When Frederick, Maryland, began being settled in 1745, trade routes between Frederick and Baltimore emerged. Present-day New Market developed along this road, which later was improved. It became known as the National Road and the Gateway to the West. In 1926, U.S. Route 40, a major coast-to-coast highway, was constructed and designated along the former National Road.

To accommodate travelers along this important colonial road, Nicholas Hall tried to plat the town of New Market in 1788. He likely had disputes with William Plummer, an owner of adjoining land and was unable to complete the project. On August 1, 1792, William Plummer laid out 36 lots for the town. Later, on January 29, 1793, Nicholas Hall laid out an additional 134 lots. On June 1, 1793, the first 19 lots were sold, initiating the town of New Market. As time passed, the town developed as an important stopping point along the route. Residents developed churches, hotels, inns, a post office, taverns, blacksmith shops, and other crucial services, including doctors.

The New Market Historic District was listed on the National Register of Historic Places in 1975. Henry Nelson House was listed on the NRHP in 1980 and Drummine Farm in 1987.

== Antiques Capital of Maryland ==
New Market was once known as the "Antiques Capital of Maryland". Downtown New Market once had a number of small shops specializing in the sale of antiques and other goods. While antiques tourism occurs year-round, New Market holds events and festivals that highlight the town's historic past. "Christmas in New Market" is held on the first Saturday in December every year. From June through October each year, New Market hosts periodic 2nd Saturday events, featuring artists, food, vendors, free concerts, and movies. A "Day in New Market" festival was formerly held annually on the first Saturday in May.

== Demographics ==
Historical population
| Census | Pop. | Note | %± |
|---|---|---|---|
| 1880 | 402 | | — |
| 1890 | 423 | | 5.2% |
| 1900 | 360 | | −14.9% |
| 1910 | 320 | | −11.1% |
| 1920 | 274 | | −14.4% |
| 1930 | 294 | | 7.3% |
| 1940 | 360 | | 22.4% |
| 1950 | 301 | | −16.4% |
| 1960 | 358 | | 18.9% |
| 1970 | 339 | | −5.3% |
| 1980 | 306 | | −9.7% |
| 1990 | 328 | | 7.2% |
| 2000 | 427 | | 30.2% |
| 2010 | 656 | | 53.6% |
| 2020 | 1,525 | | 132.5% |
U.S. Decennial Census

=== 2020 census ===
As of the 2020 census, New Market had a population of 1,525. The median age was 35.9 years. 36.5% of residents were under the age of 18 and 8.0% of residents were 65 years of age or older. For every 100 females there were 93.5 males, and for every 100 females age 18 and over there were 99.4 males age 18 and over.

85.0% of residents lived in urban areas, while 15.0% lived in rural areas.

There were 474 households in New Market, of which 61.2% had children under the age of 18 living in them. Of all households, 75.5% were married-couple households, 8.2% were households with a male householder and no spouse or partner present, and 12.4% were households with a female householder and no spouse or partner present. About 6.5% of all households were made up of individuals and 2.6% had someone living alone who was 65 years of age or older.

There were 493 housing units, of which 3.9% were vacant. The homeowner vacancy rate was 0.7% and the rental vacancy rate was 4.9%.

Racial composition as of the 2020 census
| Race | Number | Percent |
|---|---|---|
| White | 1,261 | 82.7% |
| Black or African American | 47 | 3.1% |
| American Indian and Alaska Native | 9 | 0.6% |
| Asian | 61 | 4.0% |
| Native Hawaiian and Other Pacific Islander | 2 | 0.1% |
| Some other race | 23 | 1.5% |
| Two or more races | 122 | 8.0% |
| Hispanic or Latino (of any race) | 100 | 6.6% |

=== 2010 census ===
As of the census of 2010, there were 656 people, 231 households, and 187 families residing in the town. The population density was 820.0 inhabitants per square mile (316.6/km^{2}). There were 247 housing units at an average density of 308.8 per square mile (119.2/km^{2}). The racial makeup of the town was 89.5% White, 5.5% African American, 0.3% Native American, 2.3% Asian, 0.9% from other races, and 1.5% from two or more races. Hispanic or Latino of any race were 3.5% of the population.

There were 231 households, of which 50.2% had children under the age of 18 living with them, 65.4% were married couples living together, 11.3% had a female householder with no husband present, 4.3% had a male householder with no wife present, and 19.0% were non-families. 14.7% of all households were made up of individuals, and 3.9% had someone living alone who was 65 years of age or older. The average household size was 2.84 and the average family size was 3.11.

The median age in the town was 36.3 years. 29.6% of residents were under the age of 18; 6.7% were between the ages of 18 and 24; 30.8% were from 25 to 44; 25.5% were from 45 to 64; and 7.5% were 65 years of age or older. The gender makeup of the town was 47.4% male and 52.6% female.

=== 2000 census ===
According to the 2000 Census, there were 159 households, out of which 38.4% had children under the age of 18 living with them, 57.2% were married couples living together, 10.7% had a female householder with no husband present, and 29.6% were non-families. 23.3% of all households were made up of individuals, and 3.8% had someone living alone who was 65 years of age or older. The average household size was 2.69 and the average family size was 3.24.

The median income for a household in the town was $62,292, and the median income for a family was $67,292. Males had a median income of $45,455 versus $25,313 for females. The per capita income for the town was $22,102. None of the families and 0.7% of the population were living below the poverty line, including no under eighteens and 6.9% of those over 64.

== Education ==
It is in Frederick County Public Schools.

School zoning for residential-zoned areas is as follows: New Market Elementary School, New Market Middle School, and Linganore High School.

== Transportation ==
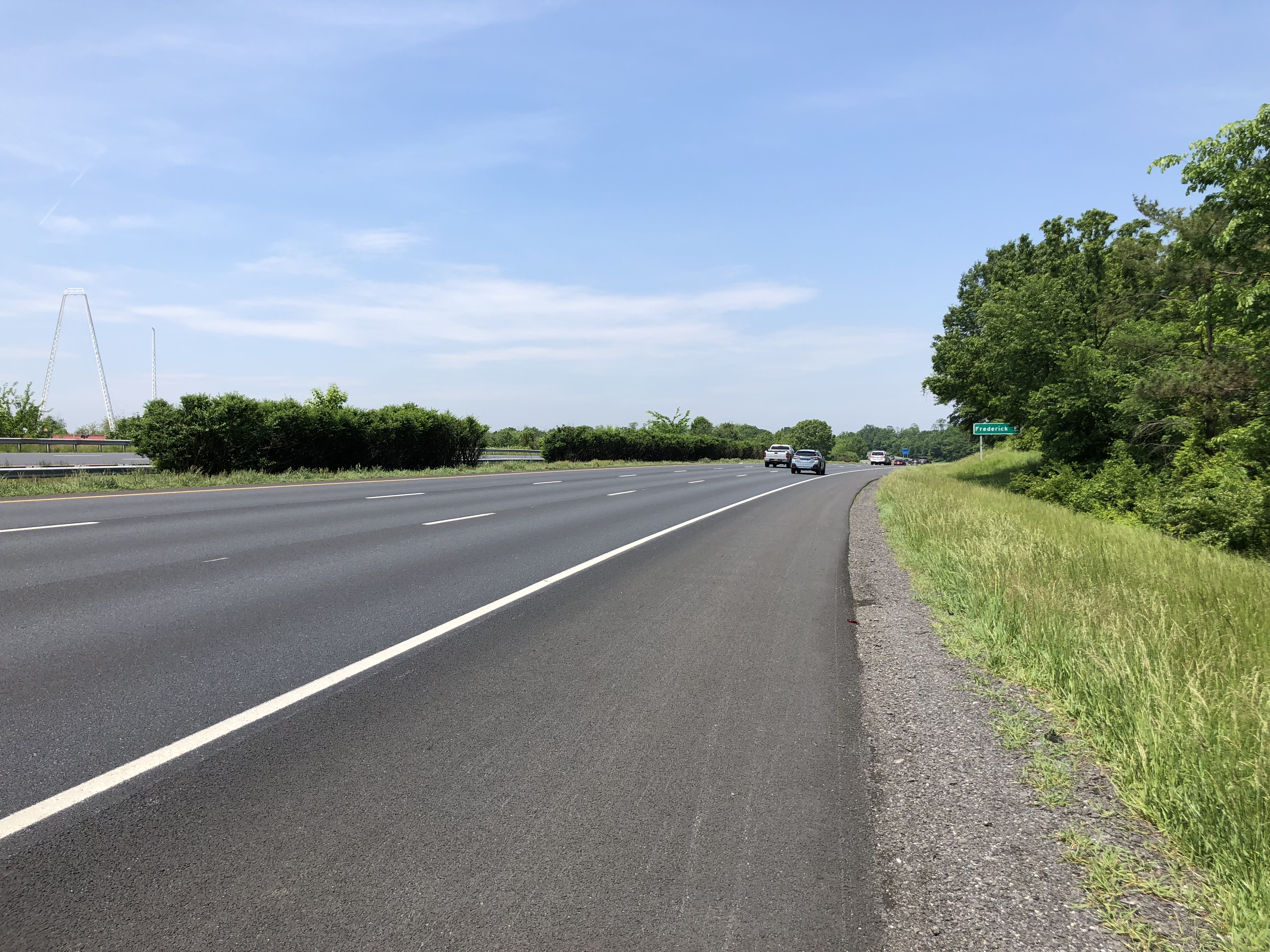
I-70 and US 40 westbound in New Market

The primary means of travel to and from New Market is by road. The main highway serving New Market is Interstate 70 and U.S. Route 40, which run concurrently through the town. I-70 and US 40 connects eastward to Baltimore and westward to Frederick and Hagerstown. Maryland Route 75 also serves New Market, connecting northward to Libertytown and south to Hyattstown. Maryland Route 144 connects the center of town to MD 75 via Main Street.

== Notable people ==
- John Vincent Atanasoff, inventor who created the first binary computer, Atanasoff–Berry Computer.
- William Plummer Benton, Served as a general from Indiana in the American Civil War

== See also ==
- New Market Historic District
