= Whitman–Cobb House =

Historic house in Alabama, United States

- U.S. National Register of Historic Places
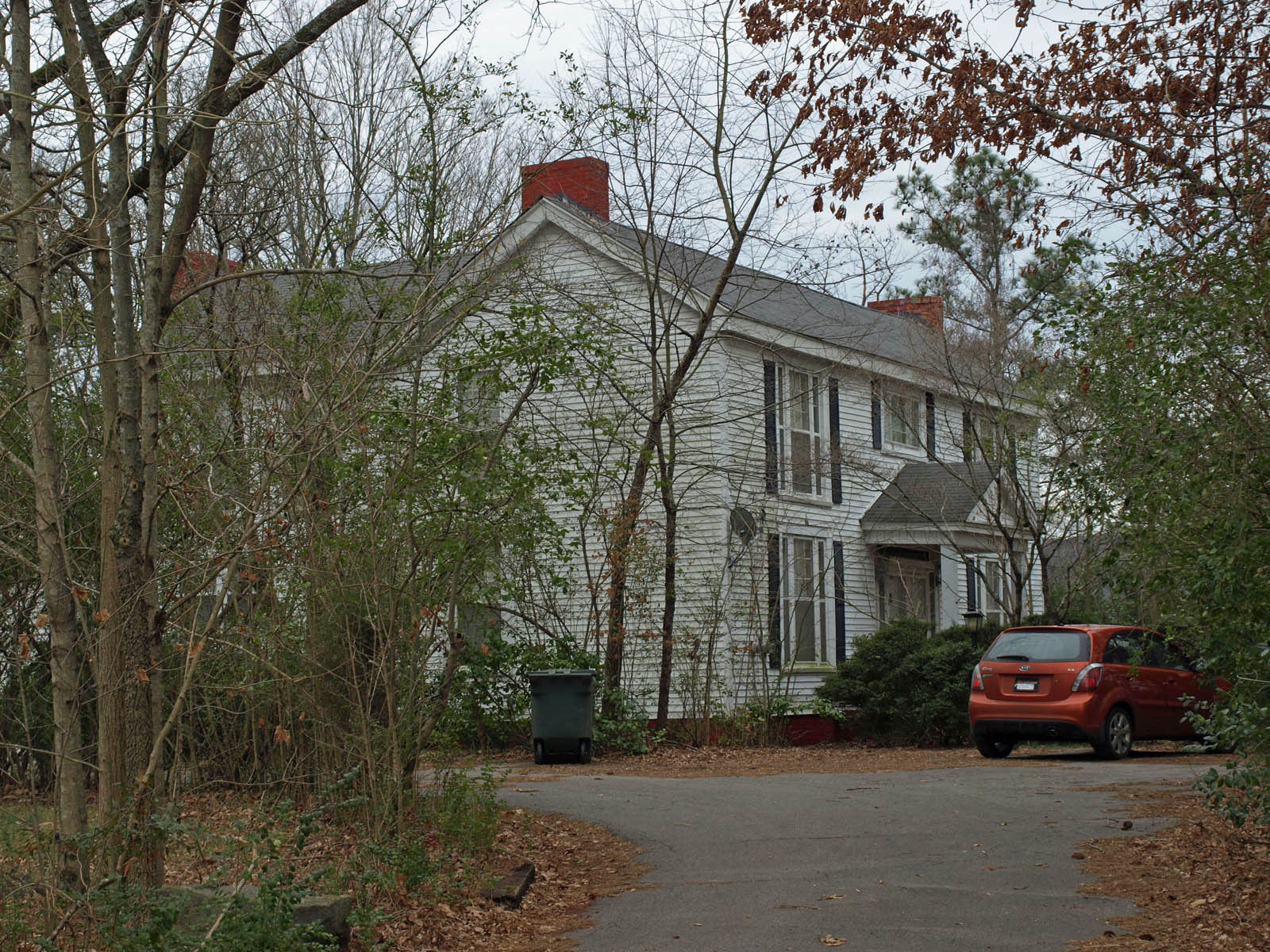
- The house in February 2012

- Location within Alabama Location within the United States
- Location: Winchester Rd., New Market, Alabama
- Coordinates: 34°54′13″N 86°25′45″W
- Area: 5.5 acres (2.2 ha)
- Built: c. 1861
- Architectural style: Greek Revival, Federal
- NRHP reference No.: 82002057
- Added to NRHP: January 18, 1982

The Whitman–Cobb House is a historic residence in New Market, Alabama. It was built circa 1861 in a Greek Revival style with Federal and Adamesque details. The two-story house is rectangular with an ell off the rear on one side. Originally, a porch separated the house from a detached kitchen, but it was torn down and replaced around 1955 with a one-story addition containing three rooms and a garage. The three-bay façade has a one-story pedimented porch, which replaced a two-story porch in the 1940s. The main entrance is double doors flanked by sidelights and topped with a transom. Windows on the façade are nine-over-nine sashes flanked by narrow two-over-two sashes. The house has three chimneys on the gable ends; the northwest chimney is inside the clapboard siding.

The house was listed on the National Register of Historic Places in 1982.
