= New Market Historic District (New Market, Maryland) =

Historic district in Maryland, United States

- U.S. National Register of Historic Places
- U.S. Historic district
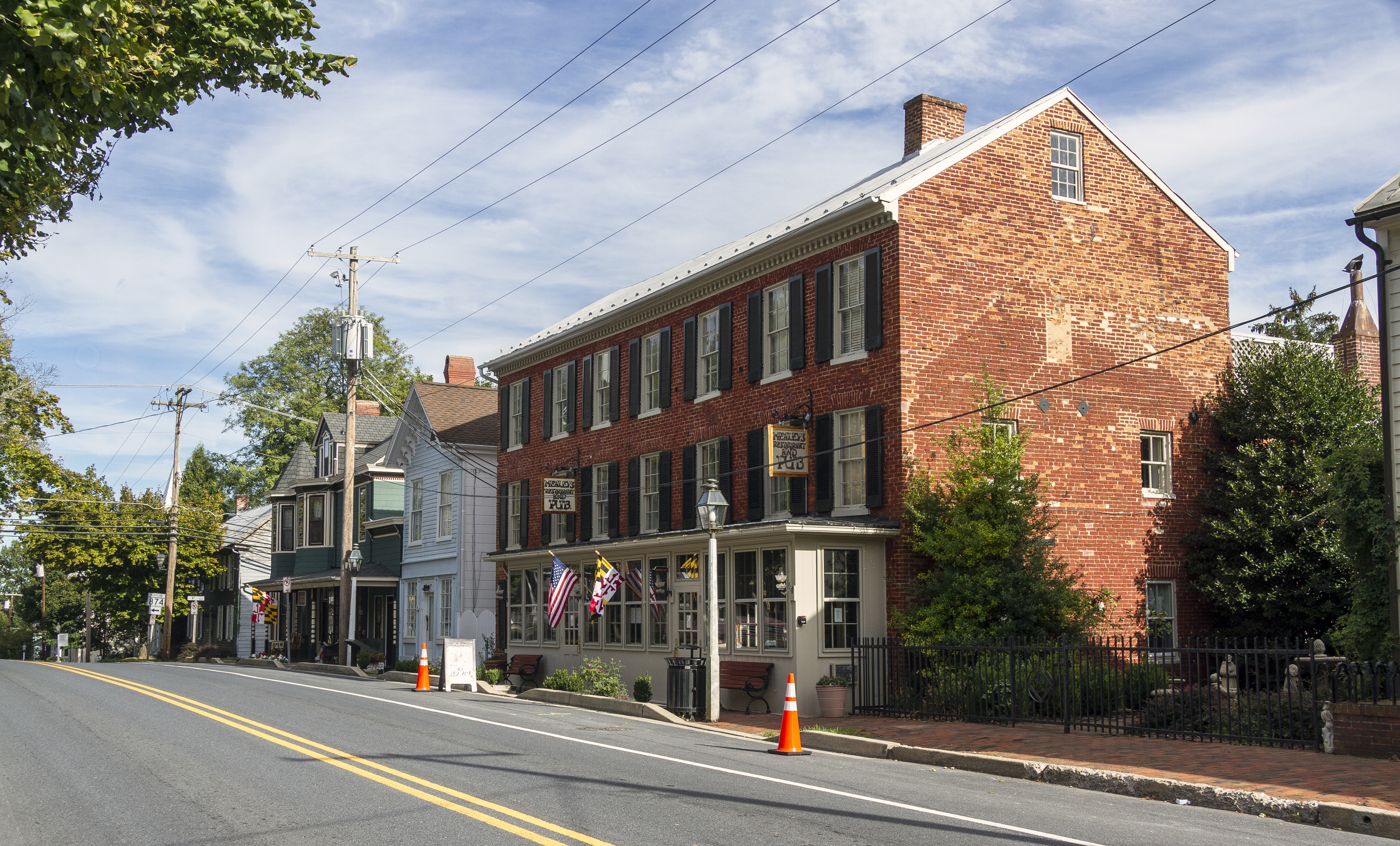

- Location within Maryland Location within the United States
- Location: Jct. of MD 144 and Old MD 75, New Market, Maryland
- Coordinates: 39°22′58″N 77°16′12″W
- Area: 66 acres (27 ha)
- Built: 1790
- Architectural style: Greek Revival, Octagon Mode, Federal
- NRHP reference No.: 75000897
- Added to NRHP: December 6, 1975

The New Market Historic District is a national historic district in New Market, Frederick County, Maryland. The district encompasses the town located along what was originally the National Pike (now MD 144). About 90 percent of the buildings in the historic district date from the 19th century and include Federal-style buildings and Greek Revival buildings, with a number of Victorian buildings, a larger example being the Ramsburg House.

It was added to the National Register of Historic Places in 1975.
