= New Market, Alabama =

- Census-designated place
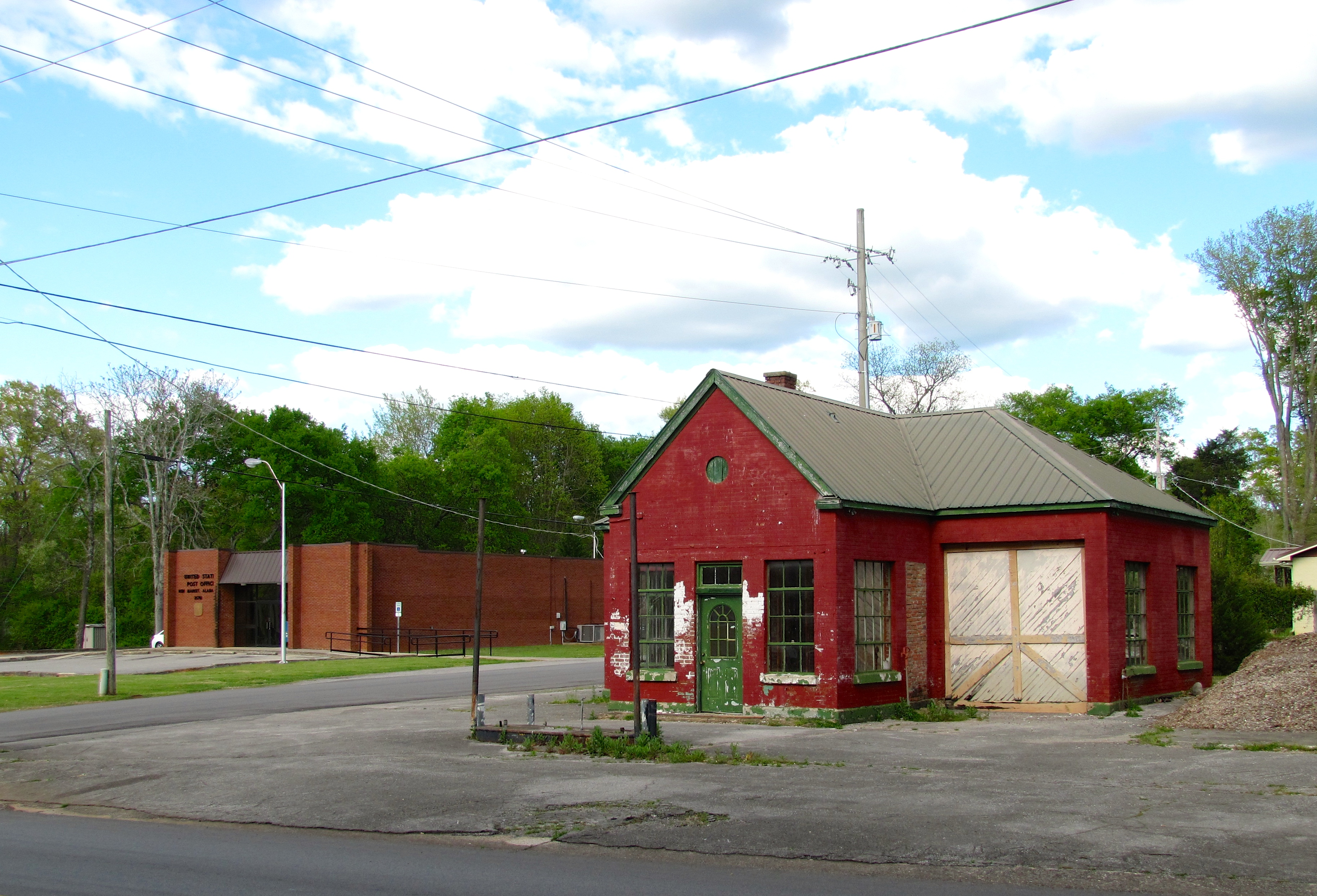
- Buildings at the intersection of Winchester Road and New Market Road in New Market. The New Market post office is in the background on the left.

- Location in Madison County and the state of Alabama
- Coordinates: 34°52′26″N 86°25′34″W
- Country: United States
- State: Alabama
- County: Madison

Area
  - Total: 17.56 sq mi (45.48 km^{2})
  - Land: 17.53 sq mi (45.40 km^{2})
  - Water: 0.031 sq mi (0.08 km^{2})
- Elevation: 791 ft (241 m)

Population (2020)
  - Total: 1,543
  - Density: 88.0/sq mi (33.98/km^{2})
- Time zone: UTC-6 (Central (CST))
  - Summer (DST): UTC-5 (CDT)
- ZIP code: 35761
- Area code: 256
- FIPS code: 01-54312
- GNIS feature ID: 2403332

New Market is an unincorporated community and census-designated place (CDP) in northeast Madison County, Alabama, United States, and is included in the Huntsville-Decatur Combined Statistical Area. As of the 2020 census, the population of the CDP was 1,543.

== History ==
In the early 19th century, several persons from Tennessee explored the area just across the border in what eventually became Madison County in Alabama. Isaac and Joseph Criner also explored the area and, in 1804, settled in the northern part near what is now called the Mountain Fork of the Flint River. George Smith, landowner of the town site, built the first log house and established a mercantile business in 1814. John Miller excavated a millrace and erected a gristmill and sawmill in 1819. Later settlers gave the name "New Market" to the community. The voting precinct was established in 1827. The post office opened the same year.

On January 30, 1966, the coldest temperature ever to be recorded in Alabama was registered in New Market, at −27 °F or −32.8 °C.

Four sites in New Market are listed on the National Register of Historic Places: the New Market Historic District, New Market Presbyterian Church, New Market United Methodist Church, and the Whitman-Cobb House. New Market is also home to the Mount Paran Cemetery, a historic cemetery recognized by the Alabama Register of Landmarks and Heritage and home to the graves of New Market pioneers including Isaac Criner and John Miller.

== Geography ==
New Market is located in northeastern Madison County. It is 17 miles (27 km) northeast of Huntsville and 6 miles (10 km) south of the Tennessee border.

According to the U.S. Census Bureau, the CDP has a total area of 17.6 square miles (45.5 km^{2}), of which 0.03 square miles (0.08 km^{2}), or 0.17%, are water. The Mountain Fork of the Flint River flows through the northern part of the community. Backbone Mountain and other outliers at the southern end of the Cumberland Plateau rise 800 feet (240 m) above the town to the east.

== Demographics ==
Historical population
| Census | Pop. | Note | %± |
|---|---|---|---|
| 1880 | 144 | | — |
| 1990 | 1,094 | | — |
| 2000 | 1,864 | | 70.4% |
| 2010 | 1,597 | | −14.3% |
| 2020 | 1,543 | | −3.4% |
U.S. Decennial Census

New Market first appeared on the 1880 U.S. Census as an unincorporated community of 144 residents. It did not appear again on the census for 110 years until 1990, when it was classified as a census-designated place (CDP).

=== Racial and ethnic composition ===
New Market CDP, Alabama – Racial and ethnic composition Note: the US Census treats Hispanic/Latino as an ethnic category. This table excludes Latinos from the racial categories and assigns them to a separate category. Hispanics/Latinos may be of any race.
| Race / Ethnicity (NH = Non-Hispanic) | Pop 2000 | Pop 2010 | Pop 2020 | % 2000 | % 2010 | % 2020 |
|---|---|---|---|---|---|---|
| White alone (NH) | 1,593 | 1,379 | 1,209 | 85.46% | 86.35% | 78.35% |
| Black or African American alone (NH) | 117 | 102 | 89 | 6.28% | 6.39% | 5.77% |
| Native American or Alaska Native alone (NH) | 42 | 22 | 29 | 2.25% | 1.38% | 1.88% |
| Asian alone (NH) | 2 | 3 | 11 | 0.11% | 0.19% | 0.71% |
| Native Hawaiian or Pacific Islander alone (NH) | 0 | 1 | 0 | 0.00% | 0.06% | 0.00% |
| Other race alone (NH) | 0 | 0 | 1 | 0.00% | 0.00% | 0.06% |
| Mixed race or Multiracial (NH) | 44 | 20 | 115 | 2.36% | 1.25% | 7.45% |
| Hispanic or Latino (any race) | 66 | 70 | 89 | 3.54% | 4.38% | 5.77% |
| Total | 1,864 | 1,597 | 1,543 | 100.00% | 100.00% | 100.00% |

=== 2020 census ===
As of the 2020 census, New Market had a population of 1,543. The median age was 42.9 years. 22.4% of residents were under the age of 18 and 15.9% of residents were 65 years of age or older. For every 100 females there were 106.0 males, and for every 100 females age 18 and over there were 105.1 males age 18 and over.

0.0% of residents lived in urban areas, while 100.0% lived in rural areas.

There were 608 households in New Market, of which 28.1% had children under the age of 18 living in them. Of all households, 53.8% were married-couple households, 21.5% were households with a male householder and no spouse or partner present, and 20.7% were households with a female householder and no spouse or partner present. About 26.0% of all households were made up of individuals and 9.2% had someone living alone who was 65 years of age or older.

There were 670 housing units, of which 9.3% were vacant. The homeowner vacancy rate was 1.6% and the rental vacancy rate was 18.4%.

=== 2010 census ===
As of the census of 2010, there were 1,597 people, 632 households, and 454 families residing in the CDP. The population density was 91 people per square mile (35 people/km^{2}). There were 714 housing units at an average density of 40.8 units per square mile (15.8 units/km^{2}). The racial makeup of the CDP was 88.5% White, 6.7% Black or African American, 1.4% Native American, 0.2% Asian, 1.9% from other races, and 1.3% from two or more races. 4.4% of the population were Hispanic or Latino of any race.

There were 632 households, out of which 28.6% had children under the age of 18 living with them, 56.3% were married couples living together, 10.4% had a female householder with no husband present, and 28.2% were non-families. 23.6% of all households were made up of individuals, and 7.6% had someone living alone who was 65 years of age or older. The average household size was 2.53 and the average family size was 3.00.

In the CDP, the population was spread out, with 22.9% under the age of 18, 9.3% from 18 to 24, 24.3% from 25 to 44, 31.3% from 45 to 64, and 12.3% who were 65 years of age or older. The median age was 41.1 years. For every 100 females, there were 101.9 males. For every 100 females age 18 and over, there were 106.4 males.

The median income for a household in the CDP was $42,857, and the median income for a family was $51,250. Males had a median income of $36,250 versus $27,068 for females. The per capita income for the CDP was $22,043. About 11.9% of families and 14.6% of the population were below the poverty line, including 35.3% of those under age 18 and 21.1% of those age 65 or over.

=== 2000 census ===
As of the census of 2000, there were 1,864 people, 692 households, and 534 families residing in the CDP. The population density was 108.4 inhabitants per square mile (41.9/km^{2}). There were 787 housing units at an average density of 45.8 units per square mile (17.7 units/km^{2}). The racial makeup of the CDP was 87.18% White, 6.28% Black or African American, 2.25% Native American, 0.16% Asian, 1.34% from other races, and 2.79% from two or more races. 3.54% of the population were Hispanic or Latino of any race.

There were 692 households, out of which 38.0% had children under the age of 18 living with them, 61.7% were married couples living together, 10.8% had a female householder with no husband present, and 22.8% were non-families. 19.1% of all households were made up of individuals, and 6.8% had someone living alone who was 65 years of age or older. The average household size was 2.67 and the average family size was 3.05.

In the CDP, the population was spread out, with 26.1% under the age of 18, 8.3% from 18 to 24, 35.2% from 25 to 44, 19.5% from 45 to 64, and 10.9% who were 65 years of age or older. The median age was 35 years. For every 100 females, there were 101.3 males. For every 100 females age 18 and over, there were 101.3 males.

The median income for a household in the CDP was $42,985, and the median income for a family was $46,696. Males had a median income of $36,204 versus $18,188 for females. The per capita income for the CDP was $18,799. About 7.5% of families and 11.2% of the population were below the poverty line, including 14.7% of those under age 18 and 7.8% of those age 65 or over.

== Public services ==
Water service in the New Market area is run by the Madison County Water Authority. Sewer service is unavailable. Huntsville Utilities provides electric service.

The Madison County Sheriff's Department administers law and order in the community, and the New Market Volunteer Fire Department provides fire protection.

=== Education ===
New Market is home to several schools run by the Madison County Schools school district, which is the school district of New Market.

K-8 schools

- New Market School
- Walnut Grove Elementary School

Middle schools

- Buckhorn Middle School

High schools

- Buckhorn High School

== Notable people ==
- Joe W. Davis, mayor of Huntsville from 1968 to 1988
- Denver Jones, basketball player for Florida International University and Auburn University, now playing in the Israeli Basketball Premier League.
- Woodall Rodgers, mayor of Dallas, Texas from 1939 to 1947
- Sam Streeter, baseball pitcher in the Negro leagues from 1920 to 1936
- T. T. Terry, first mayor of Huntsville, serving from 1916 to 1918
