= New Market Presbyterian Church (New Market, Alabama) =

Historic church in Alabama, United States

- U.S. National Register of Historic Places
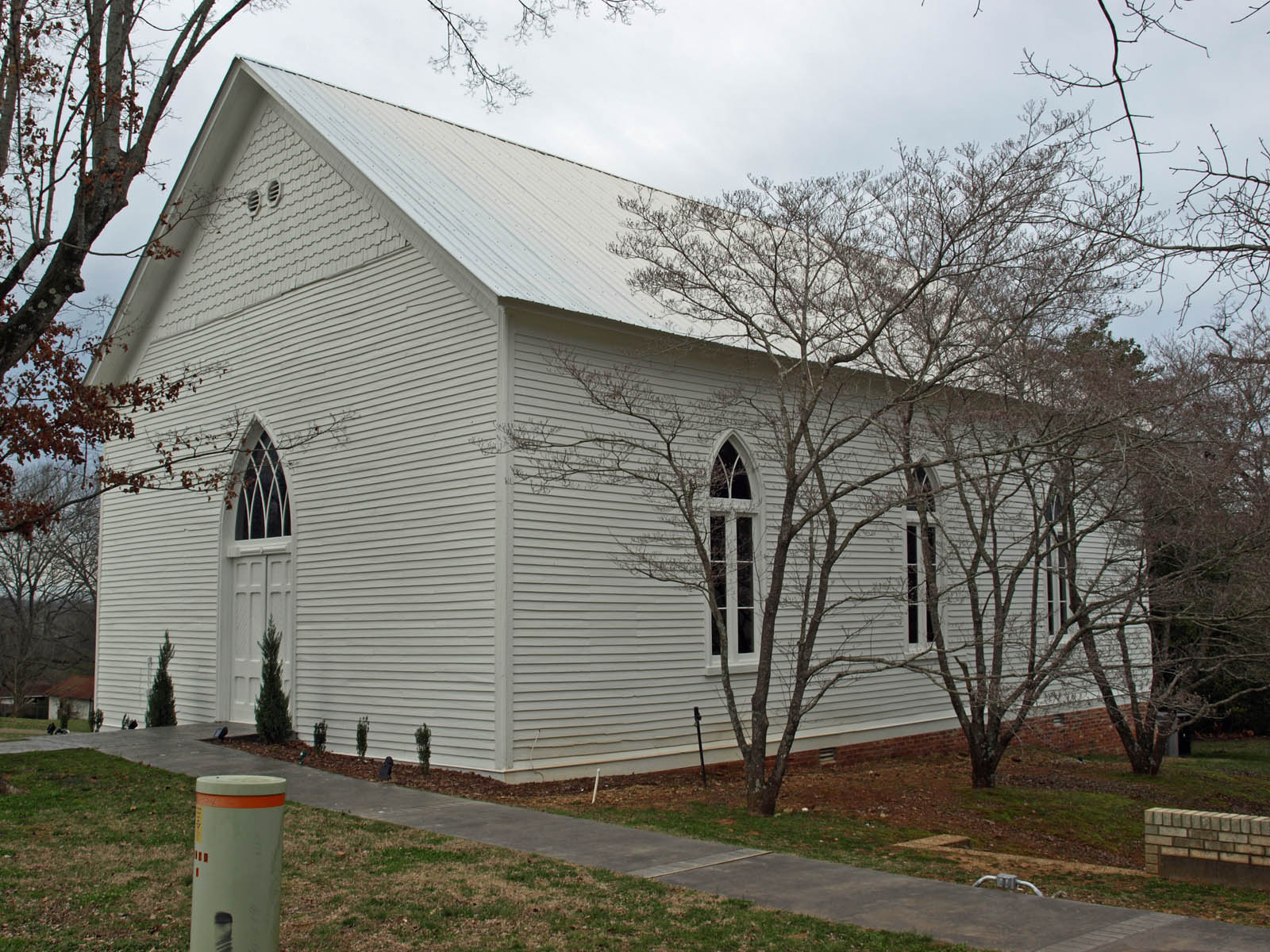
- The church in February 2012

- Location within Alabama Location within the United States
- Location: 1723 New Market Rd., New Market, Alabama
- Coordinates: 34°54′37″N 86°25′46″W
- Area: 0.6 acres (0.24 ha)
- Built: 1888
- Built by: Lem Teague
- Architectural style: Late Gothic Revival
- Website: https://newmarketpresbyterian.org
- NRHP reference No.: 88001348
- Added to NRHP: August 25, 1988

New Market Presbyterian Church is a historic building located in New Market, Alabama. The Late Gothic Revival-style church was built in 1888, and added to the National Register of Historic Places in 1988.

== Church history ==
The National Register of Historic Places plaque in front of the Sanctuary reads: "Mary Miller deeded land in 1849 to serve both Methodist and Cumberland Presbyterian congregations. The original building burned and the Methodists in 1882 sold their interest in a second building. This second church destroyed by a tornado in 1884. Present building erected in 1888. In 1906 the Cumberland Presbyterians left to form a new church, and the remaining members affiliated with the First Presbyterian Church, USA."

The physical building is located at 1723 New Market Road in New Market, Alabama.

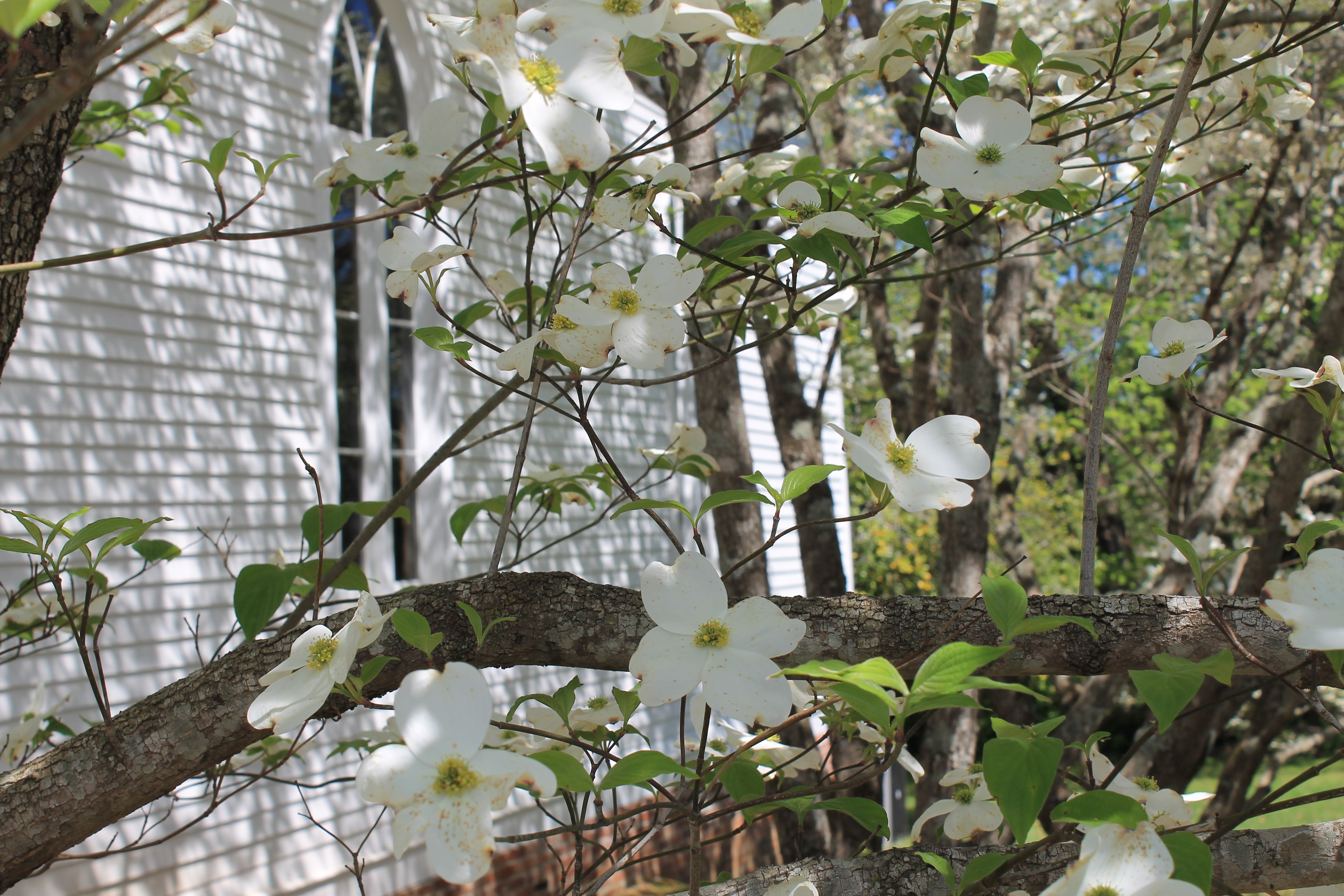

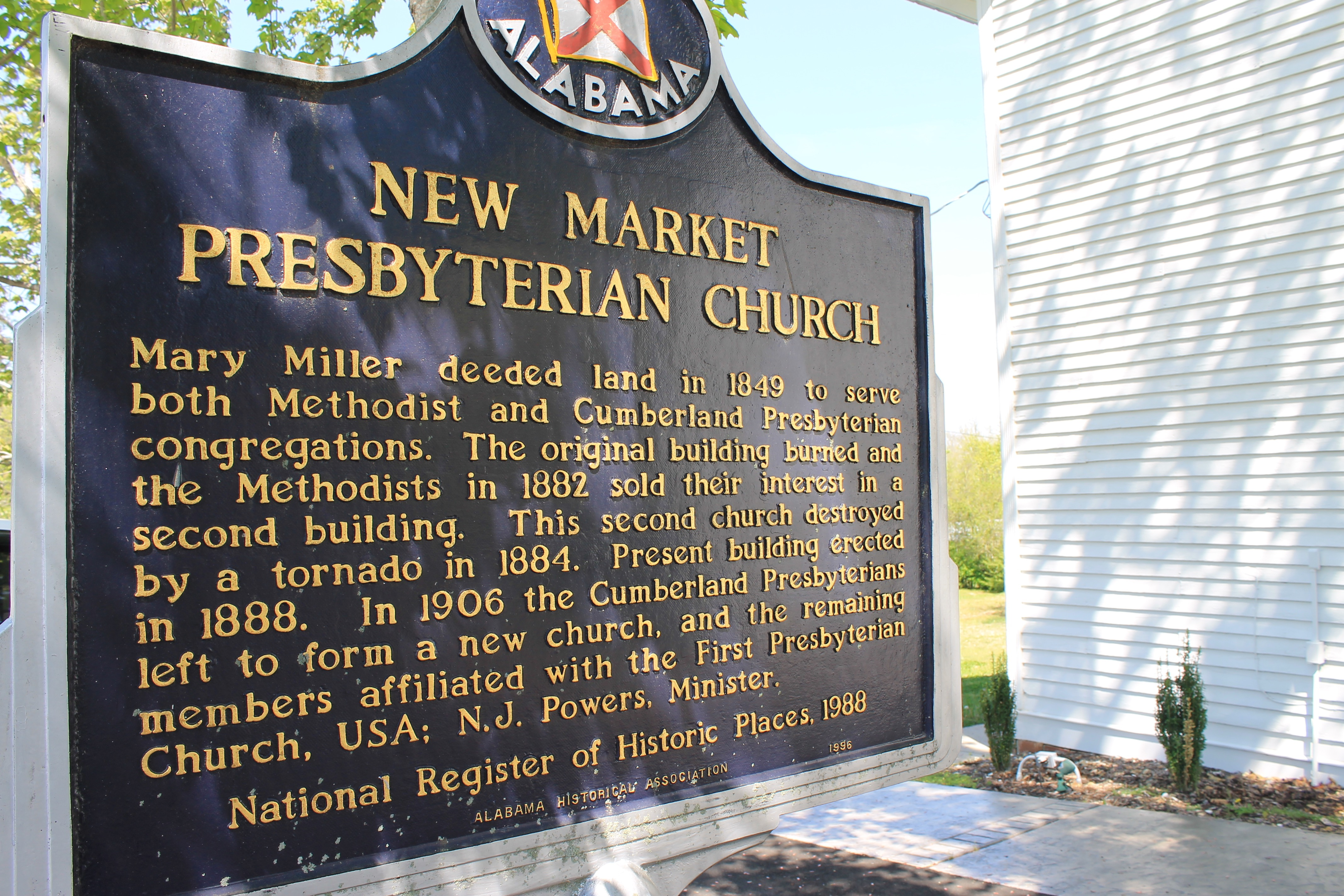

=== Historical architecture ===
According to New Market Presbyterian's National Register of Historic Places Registration form, the building is in "near-original condition, including the clear cylinder-glass of the lancet windows." The Gothic-style pews were originally in the Marysville Presbyterian Church (Marysville, Alabama). The "seven-plane barrel-vaulted wooden ceiling" is rumored to be a gift from the church's building contractor. The ceiling's design consists of "narrow boards in large half-bond rectangles divided by wide borders of the same material in herringbone and soldier patterns." The interior wood is naturally finished and varnished. The sanctuary's suspended stove fluke was removed around 1980 and replaced with central heating and cooling.
