= Newmarket, New Hampshire =

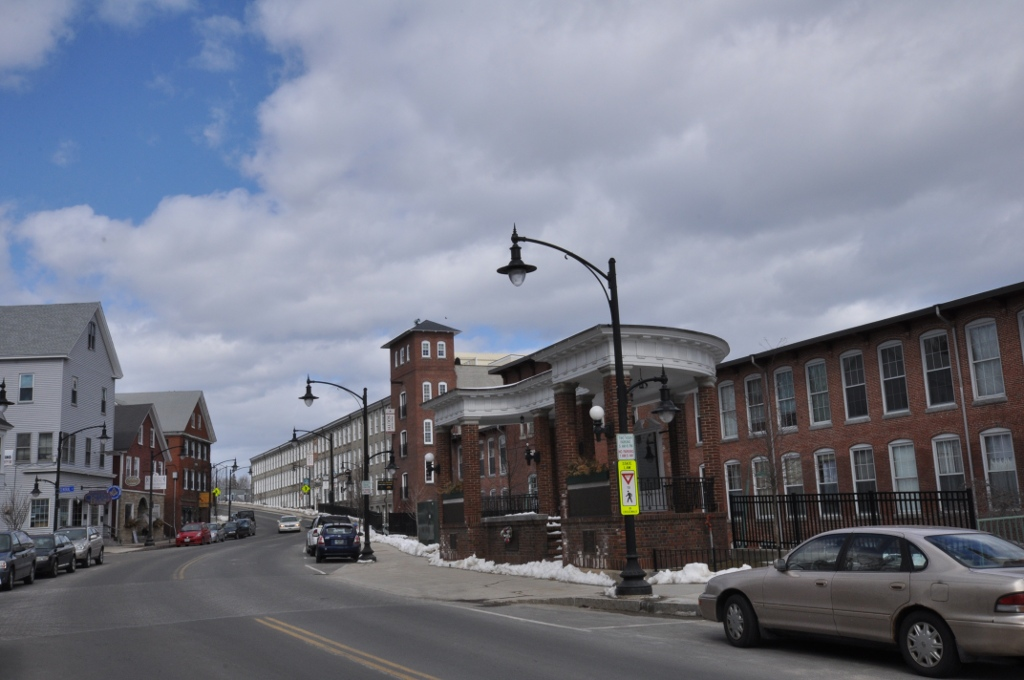
- Downtown Newmarket

- Seal

- Location in Rockingham County and the state of New Hampshire
- Coordinates: 43°04′58″N 70°56′06″W
- Country: United States
- State: New Hampshire
- County: Rockingham
- Incorporated: 1727

Government
  - Town Council: Members: Katanna Conley, Chair; Brian Ward; Scott Blackstone; Joe Lamattina; Colin D. White, Sr.; Sonke Dornblut; Justin Glazebrook
  - Town Manager: Steve Fournier

Area
  - Total: 14.2 sq mi (36.7 km^{2})
  - Land: 12.6 sq mi (32.6 km^{2})
  - Water: 1.6 sq mi (4.1 km^{2}) 11.24%
- Elevation: 39 ft (12 m)

Population (2020)
  - Total: 9,430
  - Density: 749/sq mi (289.1/km^{2})
- Time zone: UTC-5 (Eastern)
  - Summer (DST): UTC-4 (Eastern)
- ZIP Code: 03857
- Area code: 603
- FIPS code: 33-52340
- GNIS feature ID: 0873683
- Website: www.newmarketnh.gov

Newmarket is a town in Rockingham County, New Hampshire, United States. The population was 9,430 at the 2020 census. Some residents are students and employees at the nearby University of New Hampshire in Durham.

The densely settled center of town, where 5,797 people resided at the 2020 census, is defined as the Newmarket census-designated place and is located at the junction of New Hampshire routes 108 and 152, along the Lamprey River.

== History ==
Incorporated in 1727, Newmarket is one of six towns granted by Massachusetts in the last year of the reign of King George I. It started as a parish of Exeter, and was granted full town privileges by the legislature in 1737. It was probably named for Newmarket in Suffolk, England. The Lamprey River, running through the town, was named for John Lamprey, an early settler. For a while, the town was called "Lampreyville". Newmarket was a center of the New England shipping trade with the West Indies. The town's main exports were timber, dried fish from the Squamscott River and salted alewives from the Lamprey River. The return cargo brought whale oil, molasses and rum back to Newmarket. Newmarket also had a robust shipbuilding presence. There were many ships built for the Royal Navy using trees from Newmarket and the surrounding towns. There is record of Newmarket building 21 ships in one year.

The Newmarket Manufacturing Company was incorporated in 1822, and constructed its first cotton textile mill during 1823 and 1824. The company dominated the mill town's waterfront and economy, with seven textile mills harnessing water power at the falls. The company had cotton shipped up from the Deep South, so its production was adversely affected by the Civil War. It built numerous support structures, including multi-family housing for workers. The company built dams far upriver to create Pawtuckaway Pond in Nottingham and Mendums Pond in Barrington—during drought, the company could release a regulated flow of water from the dams into the Lamprey to run the works. The company closed in 1929.

Newmarket was affected by the 1922 New England Textile Strike, shutting down mills in the town over an attempted wage cut and hours increase.

Adapted for modern commercial and residential uses, the mill buildings are located within the Newmarket Industrial and Commercial Historic District, which in 1980 was added to the National Register of Historic Places. In the 1970s, the mill served as the headquarters of the Timberland Company, during the years when it grew from a small work-boot manufacturer to a leading "urban" fashion brand. Timberland's headquarters are now in nearby Stratham.

The town's parish of "South Newmarket" was incorporated as the separate town of Newfields in 1895.

== Geography ==
Situated beside Great Bay in southeastern New Hampshire, Newmarket is drained by the Lamprey River and its tributary, the Piscassic River. The town's highest point is the summit of Bald Hill, at 281 feet (86 m) above sea level, near the town's southwestern corner. Great Hill, with an elevation of 228 feet (69 m), rises just south of the town center.

According to the United States Census Bureau, the town has a total area of 14.2 square miles (36.7 km^{2}), of which 12.6 square miles (32.6 km^{2}) are land and 1.6 square miles (4.1 km^{2}) are water, comprising 11.24% of the town.

The town is crossed by New Hampshire Route 108 and is the eastern terminus of New Hampshire Route 152.

== Demographics ==
Historical population
Census	Pop.	Note	%±
1790	1,137		—
1800	1,027		−9.7%
1810	1,061		3.3%
1820	1,083		2.1%
1830	2,013		85.9%
1840	2,746		36.4%
1850	1,937		−29.5%
1860	2,034		5.0%
1870	1,987		−2.3%
1880	2,368		19.2%
1890	2,742		15.8%
1900	2,892		5.5%
1910	3,348		15.8%
1920	3,181		−5.0%
1930	2,511		−21.1%
1940	2,640		5.1%
1950	2,709		2.6%
1960	3,153		16.4%
1970	3,361		6.6%
1980	4,290		27.6%
1990	7,157		66.8%
2000	8,027		12.2%
2010	8,936		11.3%
2020	9,430		5.5%
U.S. Decennial Census

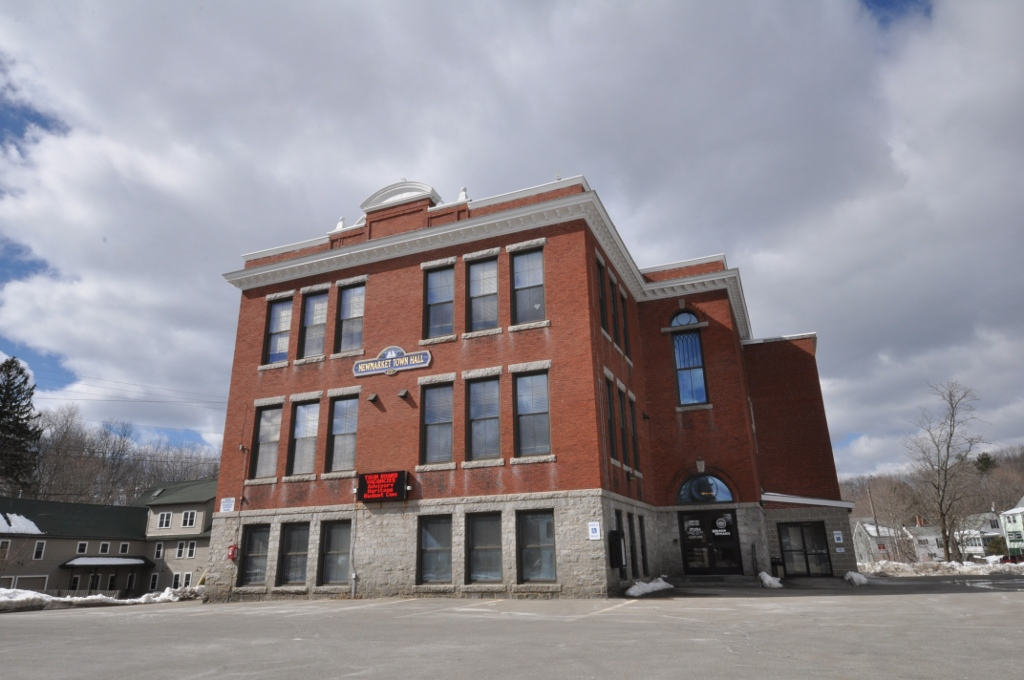
Newmarket Town Hall

As of the census of 2010, there were 8,936 people, 3,857 households, and 2,219 families residing in the town. There were 4,139 housing units, of which 282, or 6.8%, were vacant. The racial makeup of the town was 92.2% white, 1.0% African American, 0.2% Native American, 4.0% Asian, 0.1% Native Hawaiian or Pacific Islander, 0.6% some other race, and 1.9% from two or more races. 2.3% of the population were Hispanic or Latino of any race.

Of the 3,857 households, 27.2% had children under the age of 18 living with them, 45.2% were headed by married couples living together, 8.5% had a female householder with no husband present, and 42.5% were non-families. 27.7% of all households were made up of individuals, and 7.1% were someone living alone who was 65 years of age or older. The average household size was 2.32, and the average family size was 2.86.

In the town, 19.7% of the population were under the age of 18, 13.1% were from 18 to 24, 30.3% from 25 to 44, 27.3% from 45 to 64, and 9.7% were 65 years of age or older. The median age was 35.8 years. For every 100 females, there were 98.4 males. For every 100 females age 18 and over, there were 96.3 males.

For the period 2011–2015, the estimated median annual income for a household was $62,688, and the median income for a family was $90,703. Male full-time workers had a median income of $48,989 versus $40,428 for females. The per capita income for the town was $32,633. 10.9% of the population and 5.0% of families were below the poverty line. 9.2% of the population under the age of 18 and 5.9% of those 65 or older were living in poverty.

The town of Newmarket has a small but growing Laotian and Laotian American population, refugees and their families. Buddhist practitioners among the Laotians attend the Wat Lao Mixarayam Temple in Lowell, Massachusetts.

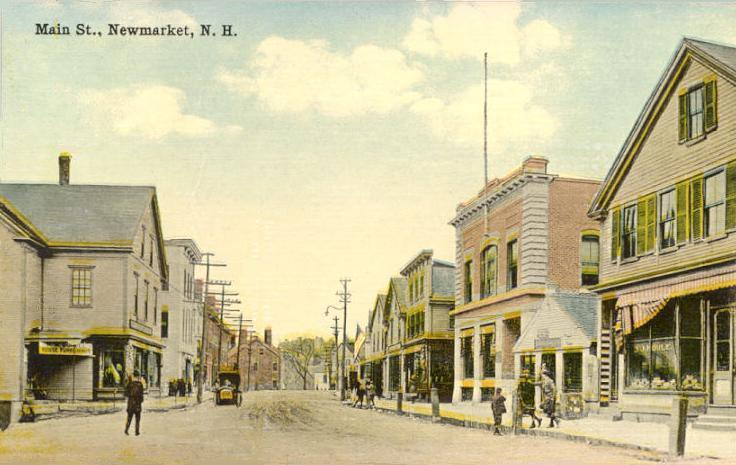
Main Street c. 1912

== Arts and culture ==
=== Sites of interest ===
- Stone School Museum
- The Stone Church, music venue
- New Hampshire Historical Marker No. 209: Wentworth Cheswill (1746–1817)
- New Hampshire Historical Marker No. 290: Henry "Hammerin' Hank" Wajda 1934–1973

== Infrastructure ==
Newmarket Fire and Rescue is a combination full-time/volunteer department providing fire and emergency medical services within the town. Newmarket Fire and Rescue also provides the neighboring town of Newfields with an ambulance transport service. The department consists of 45 volunteers and two full-time staff. In 2017, staff were awarded a Unit Citation by the New Hampshire Division of Fire Standards and Training and Emergency Medical Services for heroic actions undertaken at a car accident in 2017. The town is also the site of several publicly available electric vehicle charging stations, including at the Newmarket Library and Schanda Park.

== Education ==
The town is home to the Newmarket Junior-Senior High School.

== Notable people ==
=== Born in Newmarket ===
- Charles Branscomb (1822–1891), attorney, co-founder of Lawrence, Kansas
- Wentworth Cheswill (1746–1817), justice of the peace
- Tom Gunning (1862–1931), professional baseball catcher during the 1880s
- Charles W. Hoitt (1847–1925), lawyer, politician, onetime president of the New Hampshire Senate
- John Scannell (1872–1951), first head coach of what is now the New Hampshire Wildcats football team in Durham
- Henry Tufts (1748–1831), thief, autobiographer
- Henry Wajda (1934–1973), Thoroughbred horse racing jockey
- Caroline Marshall Woodward (1828–1890), author, artist

=== Residents ===
- Emma Lenora Borden (1851–1927), murder trial witness in the trial of her younger sister Lizzie Andrew Borden
- John Brodhead (1770–1838), U.S. congressman
- Liza Corso (born 2003), American Paralympic middle-distance runner
- Lynn Jennings (born 1960), Olympic bronze medalist runner
- George W. Kittredge (1805–1881), U.S. congressman
- Bill Morrissey (1951–2011), folk singer-songwriter
- William B. Small (1817–1878), U.S. congressman
- William Weir Stickney (1801–1888), U.S. Attorney and member of the New Hampshire House of Representatives
- Chad Young (1995–2017), professional bicycle racer

== Gallery ==
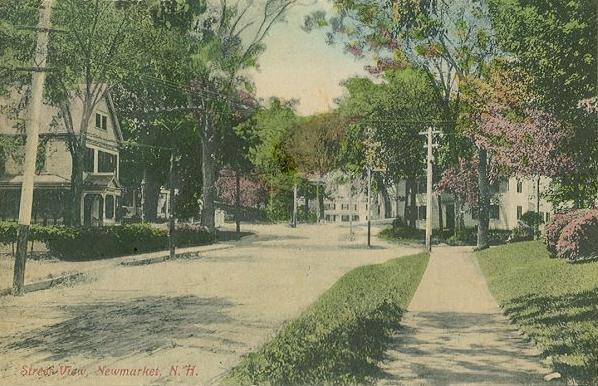
Street view c. 1910

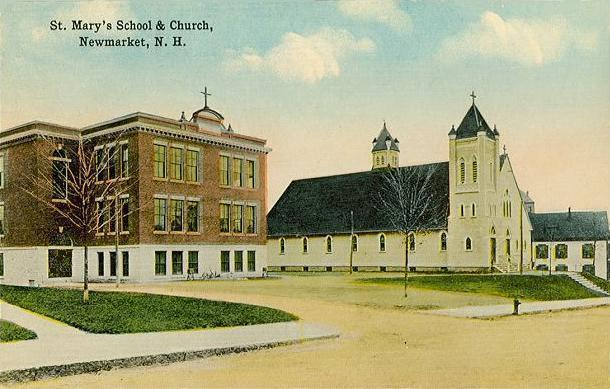
St. Mary's School c. 1912, now Newmarket Town Hall

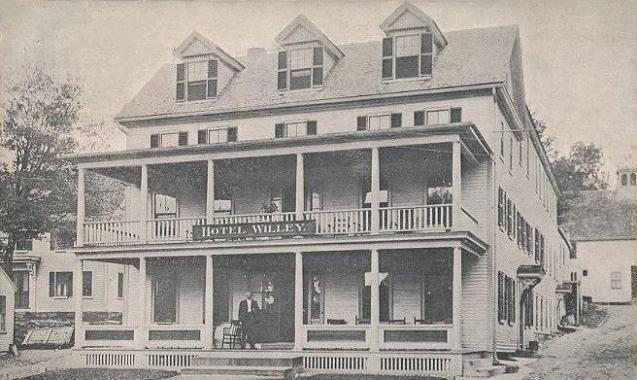
Hotel Willey in 1913
