= Seavey =

Seavey may refer to:

- Seavey House (disambiguation), several places
- Seavey Township, Aitkin County, Minnesota, United States
- Seavey's Island, New Hampshire, United States
- Seavey (name), which can be both a surname and a middle name
