= Garber =

Garber may refer to:

== People ==
See Garber (surname)

== US places ==
- Garber, Iowa, a city
- Garber, Missouri, an unincorporated community
- Garber, Oklahoma, a city

== Others ==
- 3076 Garber, a Main Belt asteroid
- Garber High School, a public high school in Essexville, Michigan
- Garber House (disambiguation), several places
- Paul E. Garber Preservation, Restoration, and Storage Facility, a restoration and storage facility for the Smithsonian Institution's National Air and Space Museum

== See also ==
- Garver (disambiguation)
