= Garver =

Garver is a surname. Notable people with the surname include:

- Abe Garver, American investment banker
- Alice Garver (1924–1966), American painter and printmaker
- Chris Garver (born 1970), American tattoo artist
- Jim Garver (born 1957), American country music guitarist
- John F. Garver (1878–1949), American leader in the Reorganized Church of Jesus Christ of Latter Day Saints
- Kathy Garver (born 1945), American television, stage, screen, and voice actress
- Kevin Garver (born 1987), American football coach
- Lori Garver (born 1961), Deputy NASA Administrator
- Mitch Garver (born 1991), American baseball player
- Ned Garver (1925–2017), American baseball player
- Newton Garver (1928–2014), American philosopher
- Oliver B. Garver Jr. (1925–1996), American civil rights activist and Episcopal Church prelate
- Samuel B. Garver (1839–1911), American farmer and politician
- W. F. Garver (1864–1942), American judge
- William Lincoln Garver (1867–1953), American socialist, architect, and author

== See also ==
- Garver-Rentschler Barn - a historic building in Hamilton, Ohio
- Garber (disambiguation) - surname
