= Blow Me Down =

Blow Me Down may refer to:

- Blow Me Down!, a 1933 Popeye theatrical cartoon short
- Blow Me Down, Newfoundland and Labrador, a Canadian settlement on Conception Bay
- Blow Me Down Provincial Park, a park on the island of Newfoundland
- Blow-me-down Brook, a stream in New Hampshire and tributary of the Connecticut River
- Blow-Me-Down Grange, a historic building in New Hampshire
- Blow-me-down Bluff, a bluff in Antarctica
- Blow Me Down, a 2005 novel by Katie MacAlister
- "Blow Me Down", a song by Al Green from his 1978 album Truth n' Time
- "Blow Me Down", a song by Robin Williams from the 1980 soundtrack album Popeye
- "Blow Me Down", a song by The Wiggles from their 2000 album It's a Wiggly Wiggly World
