= Williamson House =

Williamson House may refer to:

- James Spullock Williamson House, Sandy Ridge, AL, listed on the National Register of Historic Places (NRHP)
- Williamson House (Little Rock, Arkansas), NRHP-listed
- Williamson-Maley-Turner Farm, Jefferson, GA, listed on the NRHP in Georgia
- Williamson House (Monroe, Georgia), listed on the NRHP in Georgia
- A. J. Williamson House, Hilo, HI, listed on the NRHP in Hawaii
- Roy Williamson House, Edwardsville, KS, listed on the NRHP in Kansas
- Williamson–Russell–Rahilly House, Lake City, MN, listed on the NRHP in Minnesota
- Williamson House (Goshen, New Hampshire), listed on the NRHP in New Hampshire
- Williamson House (Louisburg, North Carolina), listed on the NRHP in North Carolina
- Elmwood (Grafton, North Dakota), NRHP-listed, also known as Williamson House
- Mrs. B.F. Williamson House, Darlington, SC, listed on the NRHP in South Carolina
- Thomas Williamson House, Eagleville, TN, listed on the NRHP in Tennessee
- E. D. Williamson House, Abilene, TX, listed on the NRHP in Texas
