= Mothers' and Daughters' Club House =

- U.S. National Register of Historic Places
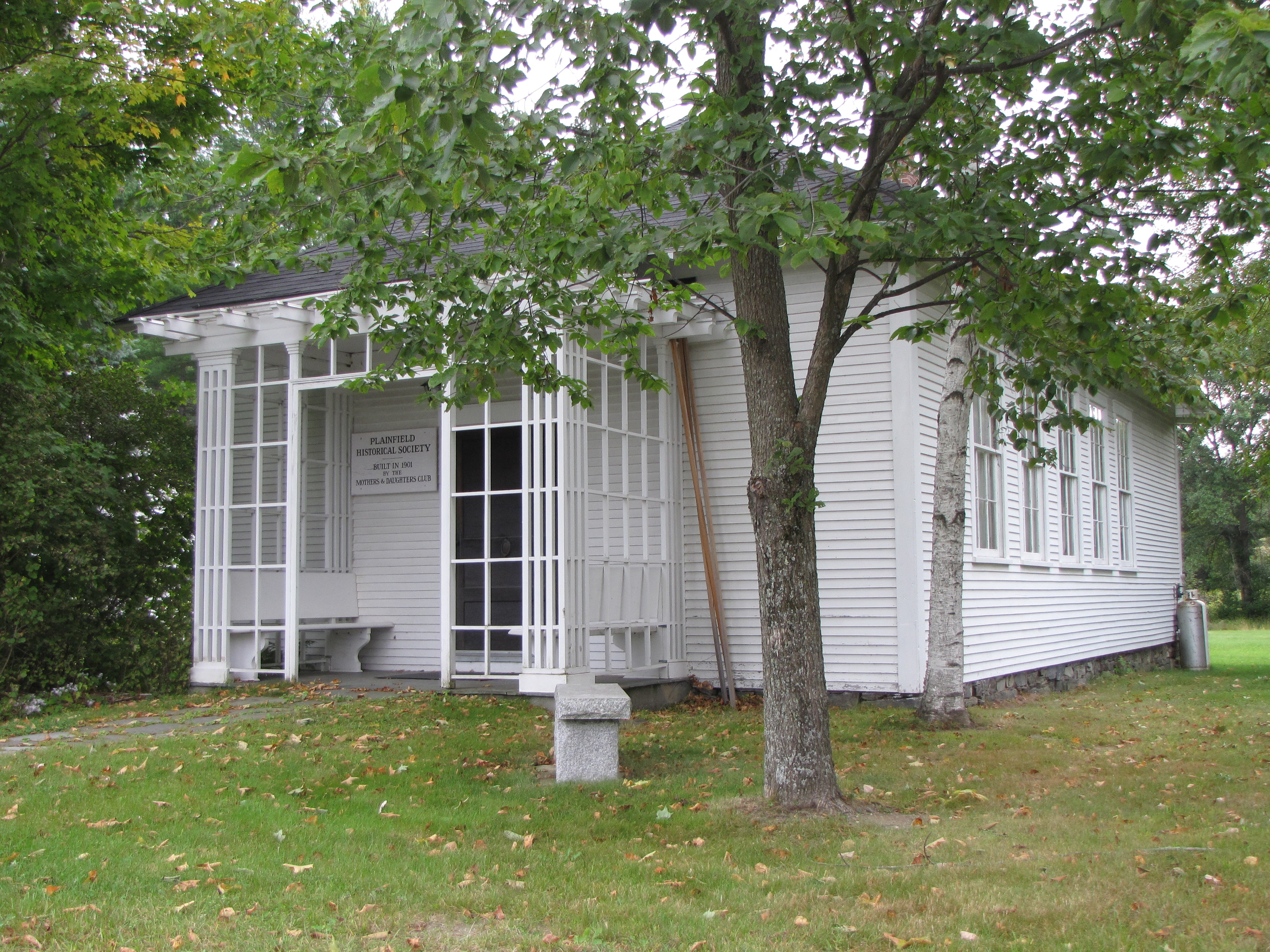
- Mothers' and Daughters' Club House

- Location within New Hampshire Location within the United States
- Location: Main St., Plainfield, New Hampshire
- Coordinates: 43°32′10″N 72°21′19″W
- Area: 0.1 acres (0.040 ha)
- Built: 1901
- Architect: Charles A. Platt
- NRHP reference No.: 82001697
- Added to NRHP: March 11, 1982

The Mothers' and Daughters' Club House is a historic social club building on Main Street (New Hampshire Route 12A) in Plainfield, New Hampshire. Built in 1901 to a design by Charles A. Platt, it is believed to be one of the oldest clubhouses for women in the country. The building, now a historical society museum, was listed on the National Register of Historic Places in 1982.

== Description and history ==
Plainfield's former Mothers' and Daughters' Club House is located in the village of Plainfield, on the east side of Main Street a short way north of Plainfield Town Hall. It is a single story wood-frame structure, five bays wide and one deep, with a pyramidal hipped roof. A kitchen and small woodshed was attached to the east (rear) end of the building, and the woodshed has been converted into an archives room. There is a trellised front porch, added shortly after the building's construction. The interior has a single large chamber, with five bays of windows on the side walls, and a fireplace at its eastern end.

The building was designed by New York City architect Charles A. Platt and built in 1901; Platt was a summer resident of nearby Cornish, and his wife was one of the club's founders. The social club for which it was built was part of a social movement involving a renaissance of handicraft, in this instance predominantly involved in the creation of hooked rugs. The club's large workroom was used both for weaving, and for the final assembly of large rugs and bedspreads sewn together from smaller segments. Profits from the sale of these items supported the club and the participants in the creation of the goods.

== See also ==
- National Register of Historic Places listings in Sullivan County, New Hampshire
