= Lear House =

Historic house in New Hampshire, United States

- U.S. National Register of Historic Places
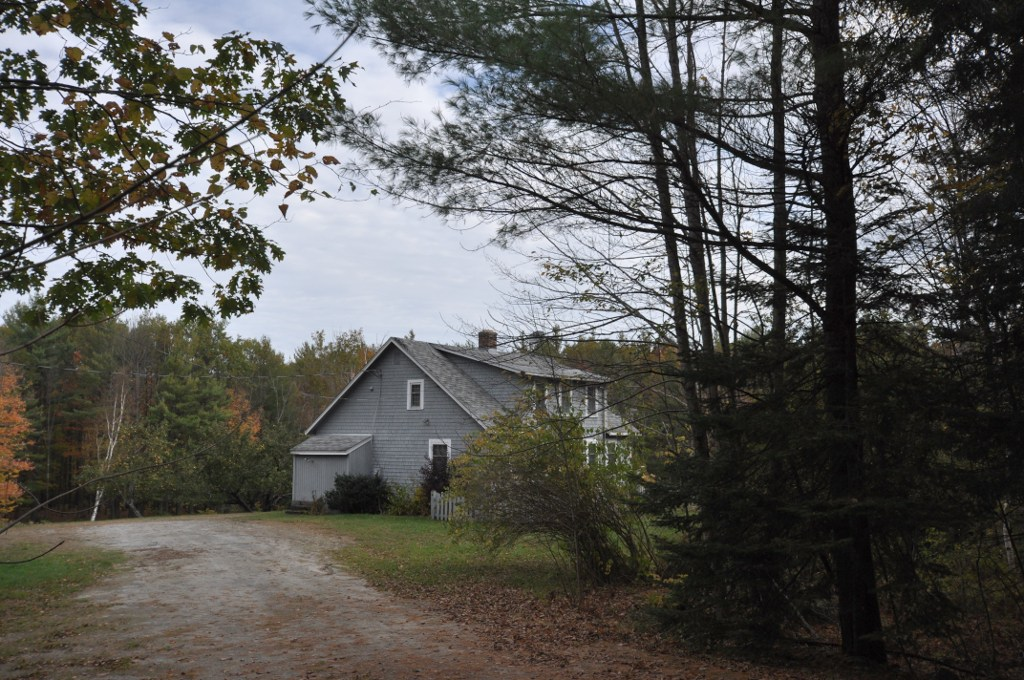

- Location within New Hampshire Location within the United States
- Location: Province Rd., Goshen, New Hampshire
- Coordinates: 43°19′23″N 72°7′19″W
- Area: 35 acres (14 ha)
- Built: 1810
- MPS: Plank Houses of Goshen New Hampshire TR
- NRHP reference No.: 85001317
- Added to NRHP: June 21, 1985

The Lear House is a historic house on Province Road in Goshen, New Hampshire. Built about 1810, it is one of the oldest of a cluster of plank-frame houses in the rural community. Its first owner, Robert Lear, was one of Goshen's first colonial settlers. The house was listed on the National Register of Historic Places in 1985.

== Description and history ==
The Lear House is located in a remote rural setting in northern Goshen, on the north side of Province Road, about 0.3 miles (0.48 km) east of its junction with Messer Road. It is a 1 1/2-story wooden structure, with a gabled roof, clapboarded exterior, and granite foundation. Its main facade is five bays wide, with sash windows arranged symmetrically on either side of the main entrance; all of these features are simply framed. The walls are formed out of wooden planks three inches thick, which are placed vertically and stabilized laterally with wooden dowels. A shed-roof dormer extends across most of the front roof face.

The house was built about 1810, and is one of the oldest plank-framed houses in the community. Goshen is home to a regionally distinctive collection of these types of houses. The likely builder and first owner was Robert Lear, one of Goshen's first white settlers. Lear was from Portsmouth, New Hampshire, and may have been related to Tobias Lear, the private secretary of George Washington.

== See also ==
- National Register of Historic Places listings in Sullivan County, New Hampshire
