= Claremont Warehouse No. 34 =

Historic building in New Hampshire, US

- U.S. National Register of Historic Places
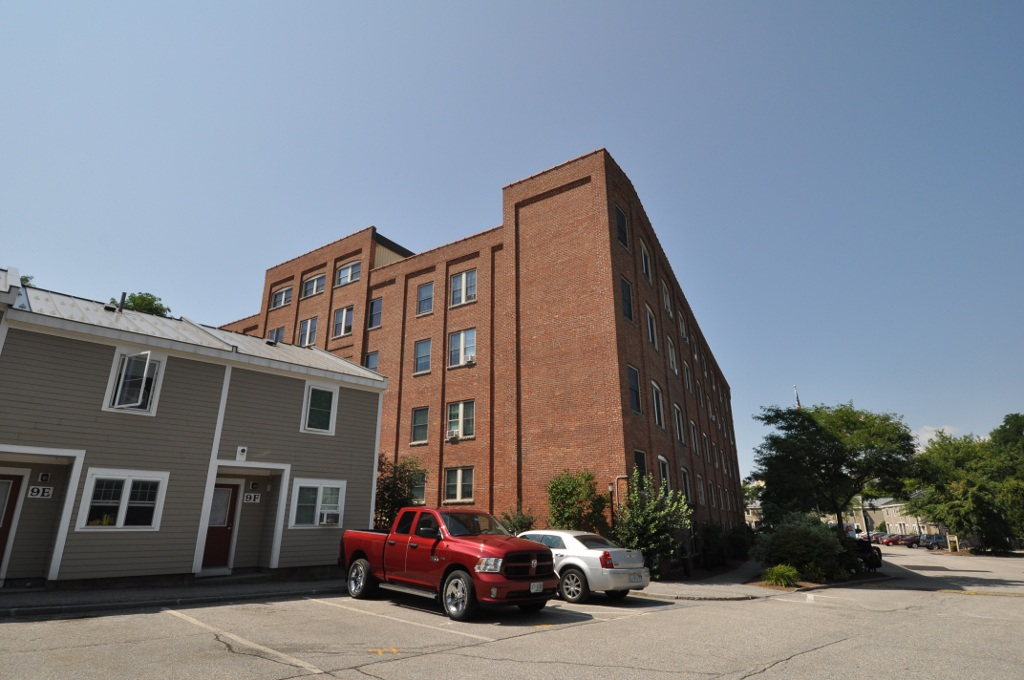

- Location within New Hampshire Location within the United States
- Location: Heritage Drive, Claremont, New Hampshire
- Coordinates: 43°22′32″N 72°20′42″W
- Area: less than one acre
- Built: 1912
- Architect: Arthur S. Coffin
- MPS: Downtown Claremont and Lower Village MRA
- NRHP reference No.: 79000320
- Added to NRHP: February 28, 1979

The Claremont Warehouse No. 34 is a historic warehouse building at Heritage Drive in Claremont, New Hampshire. Built in 1912 for the Sullivan Machine Company, it is one of the city's reminders of that company's importance as a major economic force in the region. The building was listed on the National Register of Historic Places in 1979.

== Description and history ==
The Claremont Warehouse No. 34 is located about 0.5 miles (0.80 km) west of Claremont's central Tremont Square, between Main Street and Heritage Place. It is a tall building, four stories in height, with an irregular four-sided footprint about 300 feet (91 m) long and ranging in width from 50 to 75 feet (15 to 23 m). When built, the structure had an open interior with a single floor and three mezzanine levels, with a tall three-story opening at one end, and was covered by a sawtooth roof.

The building was designed by Arthur S. Coffin and built in 1912 by the Sullivan Machinery Company, a local manufacturer of quarrying and mining equipment. It was used primarily as a warehouse until 1967, also including a welding shop for a time. A rail line ran directly into the building, facilitating the loading and unloading of materials. It was purchased in 1974 by a mattress manufacturer. A large portion of the adjacent Sullivan Company plant (located between this building and the Sugar River) was destroyed by fire in 1979. It has since been converted to residential use.

== See also ==
- National Register of Historic Places listings in Sullivan County, New Hampshire
