= Purnell House (Goshen, New Hampshire) =

Historic house in New Hampshire, United States

- U.S. National Register of Historic Places
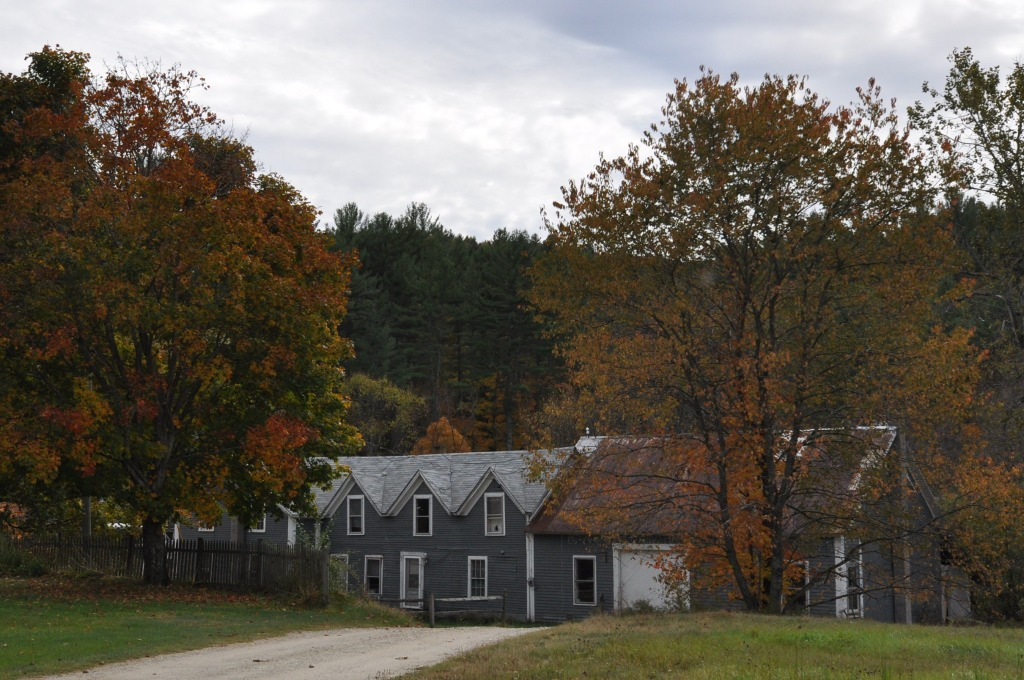

- Location within New Hampshire Location within the United States
- Location: NH 10, Goshen, New Hampshire
- Coordinates: 43°18′31″N 72°9′33″W
- Area: less than one acre
- Built: c. 1830
- Architectural style: Cape
- MPS: Plank Houses of Goshen New Hampshire TR
- NRHP reference No.: 85001319
- Added to NRHP: June 21, 1985

The Purnell House is a historic house on New Hampshire Route 10 in Goshen, New Hampshire. Built about 1830, this Cape style house is one of a cluster of 19th-century plank-frame houses in the town. The house was listed on the National Register of Historic Places in 1985.

== Description and history ==
The Purnell House is located just north of the village center of Goshen, on the west side of NH 10, about 0.25 miles (0.40 km) south of the Newport line. It is set back from the road behind another house, with access drives from both the highway and Lear Hill Road. It is a 1 1/2-story Cape style house, with a gabled roof and clapboarded exterior. It is framed with three-inch vertical planking, and its main block is five bays wide and two deep. The main block is extended by an ell and garage. Its entrance set at the center of the front facade, is topped by a four-light transom window. A two-story ell extends behind the main block to the north, connecting it to a carriage barn. The ell has a gabled roof pierced by multiple gabled dormers.

The house was built about 1830. One of its early owners was Daniel Emerson, the toll collector on the Croydon Turnpike (now NH 10). The toll gate was located in the meadow just to the north.

== See also ==
- National Register of Historic Places listings in Sullivan County, New Hampshire
