= Giffin House =

Historic house in New Hampshire, United States

- U.S. National Register of Historic Places
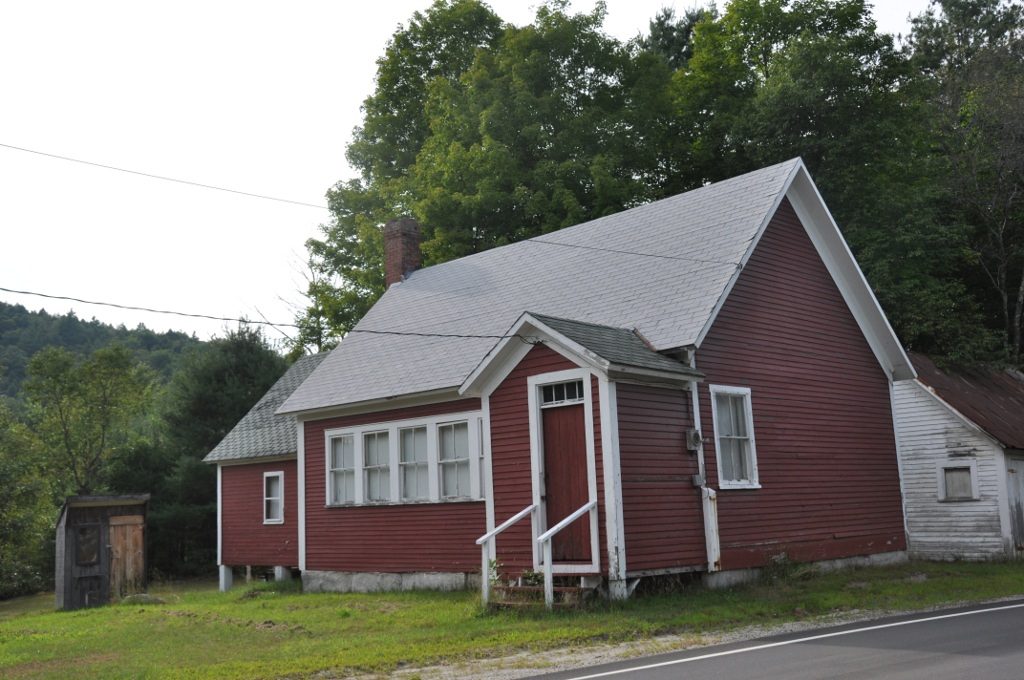

- Location within New Hampshire Location within the United States
- Location: NH 10, Goshen, New Hampshire
- Coordinates: 43°17′56″N 72°8′53″W
- Area: less than one acre
- Built: 1835
- MPS: Plank Houses of Goshen New Hampshire TR
- NRHP reference No.: 85001314
- Added to NRHP: June 21, 1985

The Giffin House is a historic house on New Hampshire Route 10 in Goshen, New Hampshire. Built in 1835, it served as a schoolhouse until 1957, and is one of three surviving 19th century schoolhouses in Goshen. It is also part of a cluster of plank-frame houses built in the community. The house was listed on the National Register of Historic Places in 1985.

== Description and history ==
The Giffin House is located a short way south of the village center of Goshen, on the west side of New Hampshire Route 10, about 0.2 miles (0.32 km) south of its junction with Brook Road. It is a single-story wooden structure, measuring just 18 by 27 feet (5.5 m × 8.2 m), with a gabled roof and clapboarded exterior, set on a granite foundation. Its walls are framed using three inch wooden planks arranged vertically, with lateral stability provided by wooden dowels. The main facade is oriented to the south, with a band of sash windows to the left of the main entrance. The entrance is sheltered by an enclosed gable-roofed vestibule. An ell extends to the west, set at a recess to the main block.

This building was built as the Mill Village District Schoolhouse in 1835, a role it played until 1957, after which it was converted to residential use. The plank-frame construction method is found in a cluster of houses in Goshen that is believed to be unique in the state for its concentration.

== See also ==
- National Register of Historic Places listings in Sullivan County, New Hampshire
