= National Register of Historic Places listings in Sullivan County, New Hampshire =

Location of Sullivan County in New Hampshire

Sullivan County, New Hampshire, United States, has 68 properties and districts listed on the National Register of Historic Places, including 2 National Historic Landmarks. Latitude and longitude coordinates are provided for many National Register properties and districts; these locations may be seen together in a map.

Contents: Counties in New Hampshire
Belknap - Carroll - Cheshire - Coös - Grafton - Hillsborough - Merrimack - Rockingham - Strafford - Sullivan

This National Park Service list is complete through NPS recent listings posted May 1, 2026.

== Current listings ==
	Name on the Register	Image	Date listed	Location	City or town	Description
1	Acworth Congregational Church	Acworth Congregational Church	June 13, 1975 (#75000132)	Northern end of town common 43°13′08″N 72°17′38″W	Acworth	
2	Acworth Silsby Library	Acworth Silsby Library	December 8, 1983 (#83004206)	Intersection of Cold Pond and Lynn Hill Rds. 43°13′06″N 72°17′33″W	Acworth	
3	Backside Inn	Backside Inn	June 21, 1985 (#85001308)	Brook Rd. 43°18′47″N 72°06′51″W	Goshen	
4	Blow-Me-Down Covered Bridge	Blow-Me-Down Covered Bridge	May 19, 1978 (#78000220)	South of Plainfield off NH 12A; 43°31′02″N 72°22′28″W	Plainfield	Over Blow-me-down Brook
5	Blow-Me-Down Grange	Blow-Me-Down Grange	March 2, 2001 (#01000205)	1071 NH 12A; 43°32′01″N 72°21′24″W	Plainfield	
6	Burford House	Burford House	June 21, 1985 (#85001309)	NH 10; 43°17′59″N 72°08′55″W	Goshen	
7	Central Business District	Central Business District	February 21, 1978 (#78003454)	Roughly bounded by Crescent, Broad, Pine, and Franklin Sts. 43°22′17″N 72°20′14″W	Claremont	
8	Charlestown Main Street Historic District	Charlestown Main Street Historic District	June 10, 1987 (#87000835)	Main St. 43°14′06″N 72°25′26″W	Charlestown	
9	Charlestown Town Hall	Charlestown Town Hall	March 15, 1984 (#84003252)	North of Summer St., off Main St. 43°14′09″N 72°25′26″W	Charlestown	
10	Salmon P. Chase Birthplace	Salmon P. Chase Birthplace	May 15, 1975 (#75000133)	8 mi (13 km) north of Claremont; 43°27′18″N 72°23′14″W	Cornish	Birthplace and childhood home of Salmon P. Chase
11	Claremont City Hall	Claremont City Hall	April 26, 1973 (#73000176)	Tremont Sq. 43°22′21″N 72°20′15″W	Claremont	
12	Claremont Warehouse No. 34	Claremont Warehouse No. 34	February 28, 1979 (#79000320)	43 River St. 43°22′32″N 72°20′42″W	Claremont	
13	Cold River Bridge	Cold River Bridge	May 17, 1973 (#73000177)	East of Langdon on McDermott Rd; 43°10′13″N 72°20′46″W	Langdon	Over Cold River
14	Cornish–Windsor Covered Bridge	Cornish–Windsor Covered Bridge	November 21, 1976 (#76000135)	West of Cornish City; 43°28′26″N 72°23′01″W	Cornish	Over Connecticut River, connecting to Windsor, Vermont
15	Cote House	Cote House	June 21, 1985 (#85001310)	Goshen Center Rd. 43°17′44″N 72°07′03″W	Goshen	
16	Covit House	Covit House	June 21, 1985 (#85001311)	Goshen Center Rd. 43°17′44″N 72°06′54″W	Goshen	
17	David Dexter House	David Dexter House	November 29, 1979 (#79000213)	Dexter Heights; 43°22′37″N 72°20′16″W	Claremont	
18	Dingleton Hill Covered Bridge	Dingleton Hill Covered Bridge	November 8, 1978 (#78000221)	Off NH 12A; 43°27′51″N 72°22′09″W	Cornish Mills	Over Mill Brook
19	Durham House	Durham House	June 21, 1985 (#85001312)	Ball Park Rd. 43°16′32″N 72°08′03″W	Goshen	
20	English Church	English Church	February 1, 1980 (#80000318)	Old Church Rd. 43°22′59″N 72°22′18″W	Claremont	
21	Farwell School	Farwell School	December 6, 1990 (#90001847)	NH 12A south of Hope Hill Cemetery; 43°18′34″N 72°23′19″W	Charlestown	
22	First Baptist Church of Cornish	First Baptist Church of Cornish	February 14, 1978 (#78000222)	Meriden Stage Rd. and NH 120; 43°29′54″N 72°16′48″W	Cornish Flat	
23	First Universalist Chapel	First Universalist Chapel	December 12, 2006 (#06001130)	3 2nd New Hampshire Turnpike; 43°13′39″N 72°10′43″W	Lempster	This 1845 building is now the town library.
24	Garber House	Garber House	June 21, 1985 (#85001313)	Willey Hill Rd. 43°16′43″N 72°07′56″W	Goshen	
25	Giffin House	Giffin House	June 21, 1985 (#85001314)	NH 10; 43°17′56″N 72°08′53″W	Goshen	
26	Capt. John Gunnison House	Capt. John Gunnison House	December 19, 1979 (#79000214)	East of Goshen on Goshen Center Rd. 43°17′37″N 72°07′38″W	Goshen	
27	Hunter Archeological Site	Hunter Archeological Site	June 7, 1976 (#76000222)	Near the bridge to Ascutney, Vermont; 43°24′11″N 72°24′02″W	Claremont	Native American archeological site; location of at least three longhouses
28	Janicke House	Janicke House	June 21, 1985 (#85001315)	Goshen Center Rd. 43°17′47″N 72°06′55″W	Goshen	
29	Kenyon Bridge	Kenyon Bridge	May 22, 1978 (#78000223)	Off NH 12A at Mill Brook and Town House Rd. 43°27′47″N 72°21′13″W	Cornish City	
30	Knights-Morey House	Knights-Morey House	June 21, 1985 (#85001316)	Province Rd. 43°19′23″N 72°07′19″W	Goshen	
31	Langdon Meeting House		January 9, 2020 (#100004859)	5 Walker Hill Rd. 43°10′00″N 72°22′47″W	Langdon	
32	Lear House	Lear House	June 21, 1985 (#85001317)	Province Rd. 43°19′47″N 72°06′21″W	Goshen	
33	Lempster Meetinghouse	Lempster Meetinghouse	September 8, 1980 (#80000319)	Lempster St. 43°14′20″N 72°12′38″W	Lempster	
34	Little Red School House 1835 District No. 7	Little Red School House 1835 District No. 7	December 1, 1980 (#80000320)	South of Newport on NH 10; 43°20′08″N 72°10′06″W	Newport	
35	Lower Village District	Lower Village District	February 21, 1978 (#78003455)	Along Central St. and Main St. on both sides of the Sugar River; 43°22′29″N 72°20′34″W	Claremont	
36	Meriden Bridge	Meriden Bridge	August 27, 1980 (#80000321)	Northwest of Meriden; 43°33′12″N 72°16′00″W	Meriden	Over Bloods Brook
37	Meriden Town Hall	Meriden Town Hall	December 20, 1998 (#98001548)	110 Main St. 43°32′54″N 72°15′39″W	Plainfield	A second town hall, in Plainfield's Meriden section
38	Monadnock Mills	Monadnock Mills	February 15, 1979 (#79000272)	Broad, Water, Crescent Sts., and Mill Rd. 43°22′26″N 72°20′17″W	Claremont	
39	Mothers' and Daughters' Club House	Mothers' and Daughters' Club House	March 11, 1982 (#82001697)	Main St. 43°32′10″N 72°21′19″W	Plainfield	
40	Nettleton House	Nettleton House	November 16, 1977 (#77000164)	26-30 Central St. 43°21′52″N 72°10′18″W	Newport	
41	Newport Downtown Historic District	Newport Downtown Historic District	June 6, 1985 (#85001201)	Main St. roughly bounded by Depot, Sunapee, Central and West Sts. 43°21′48″N 72°10′20″W	Newport	
42	North Charlestown Historic District	North Charlestown Historic District	June 9, 2005 (#05000568)	River Rd. 43°18′33″N 72°23′18″W	Charlestown	
43	Pier Bridge	Pier Bridge	June 10, 1975 (#75000134)	3 mi (4.8 km) west of Newport on Chandler Rd. over the Sugar River; 43°21′43″N 72°14′31″W	Newport	
44	Pike House	Pike House	June 21, 1985 (#85001318)	NH 10; 43°18′02″N 72°08′52″W	Goshen	
45	Plainfield Town Hall	Plainfield Town Hall	June 6, 1985 (#85001200)	NH 12A; 43°32′08″N 72°21′17″W	Plainfield	
46	Prentiss Bridge	Prentiss Bridge	May 24, 1973 (#73000179)	South of Langdon off Old Cheshire Turnpike; 43°09′11″N 72°23′38″W	Langdon	Over Great Brook
47	Protectworth Tavern	Protectworth Tavern	November 25, 1980 (#80000322)	NH 4A; 43°30′37″N 72°02′03″W	Springfield	
48	Purnell House	Purnell House	June 21, 1985 (#85001319)	NH 10; 43°18′18″N 72°09′19″W	Goshen	
49	Isaac Reed House	Isaac Reed House	July 19, 1978 (#78000337)	30-34 Main St. 43°21′51″N 72°10′21″W	Newport	
50	Richards, Dexter, & Sons Woolen Mill	Richards, Dexter, & Sons Woolen Mill	January 17, 2017 (#100000468)	169 Sunapee St. 43°21′58″N 72°09′50″W	Newport	
51	Richards Free Library	Richards Free Library	September 7, 1984 (#84003257)	58 N. Main St. 43°22′00″N 72°10′34″W	Newport	
52	William Rossiter House	William Rossiter House	May 25, 1979 (#79000215)	11 Mulberry St. 43°22′20″N 72°20′41″W	Claremont	
53	Saint-Gaudens National Historic Site	Saint-Gaudens National Historic Site	October 15, 1966 (#66000120)	South of Plainfield off NH 12A; 43°30′02″N 72°22′08″W	Cornish	Home and studio of American sculptor Augustus Saint-Gaudens; a National Historic Landmark and National Historic Site; expanded listing in 2013
54	Scranton House	Scranton House	June 21, 1985 (#85001320)	711 Brook Rd. 43°18′42″N 72°07′49″W	Goshen	
55	Seavey House	Seavey House	June 21, 1985 (#85001321)	NH 10; 43°17′53″N 72°08′50″W	Goshen	
56	South Congregational Church	South Congregational Church	March 30, 1989 (#89000187)	58 S. Main St. 43°21′40″N 72°10′14″W	Newport	
57	Springfield Town Hall and Howard Memorial Methodist Church	Springfield Town Hall and Howard Memorial Methodist Church	June 5, 1986 (#86001235)	Four Corners Rd. southeast of New London Rd. 43°29′43″N 72°02′55″W	Springfield	
58	Louis St. Gaudens House and Studio	Louis St. Gaudens House and Studio	November 15, 1972 (#72000111)	Dingleton Hill and Whitten Rds. 43°30′01″N 72°20′51″W	Cornish	
59	Stelljes House	Stelljes House	June 21, 1985 (#85001322)	NH 31; 43°15′37″N 72°06′58″W	Goshen	Possibly demolished.
60	Sullivan County Courthouse	Sullivan County Courthouse	June 25, 1973 (#73000178)	Court Sq. 43°21′52″N 72°10′19″W	Newport	Former (1824) courthouse, on hill behind town hall/current court
61	Town Hall and Courthouse	Town Hall and Courthouse	February 29, 1980 (#80000383)	20 Main St. 43°21′53″N 72°10′21″W	Newport	Now the Opera House
62	Trinity Church	Trinity Church	July 31, 1978 (#78000419)	West of Cornish Mills on NH 12A; 43°28′01″N 72°23′06″W	Cornish Mills	
63	Unity Town Hall	Unity Town Hall	June 6, 1985 (#85001199)	Off Unity Rd. and the Old New Hampshire Turnpike; 43°17′38″N 72°15′37″W	Unity	
64	Washington Common Historic District	Washington Common Historic District	March 14, 1986 (#86000345)	Junction of Half Moon Pond and Millen Pond Rds. 43°10′34″N 72°05′47″W	Washington	
65	Welcome Acres	Welcome Acres	June 21, 1985 (#85001323)	NH 10; 43°18′16″N 72°09′12″W	Goshen	
66	Williamson House	Williamson House	June 21, 1985 (#85001324)	Messer Rd. 43°20′02″N 72°06′47″W	Goshen	
67	Windswept Acres-Powers House	Windswept Acres-Powers House	June 21, 1985 (#85001325)	NH 31; 43°15′38″N 72°07′11″W	Goshen	
68	Wright's Bridge	Wright's Bridge	June 10, 1975 (#75000135)	East of Claremont off Chandler Rd. on the Sugar River Trail over the Sugar River; 43°21′33″N 72°15′34″W	Newport	

== Former listings ==
	Name on the Register	Image	Date listed	Date removed	Location	City or town	Description
1	Corbin Covered Bridge	Corbin Covered Bridge	December 12, 1976 (#76000134)	September 2, 1993	Corbin Road	Newport	Destroyed by arsonist in May 1993 and later rebuilt.

== See also ==
- List of National Historic Landmarks in New Hampshire
- National Register of Historic Places listings in New Hampshire
