= Durham House (Goshen, New Hampshire) =

Historic house in New Hampshire, United States

- U.S. National Register of Historic Places
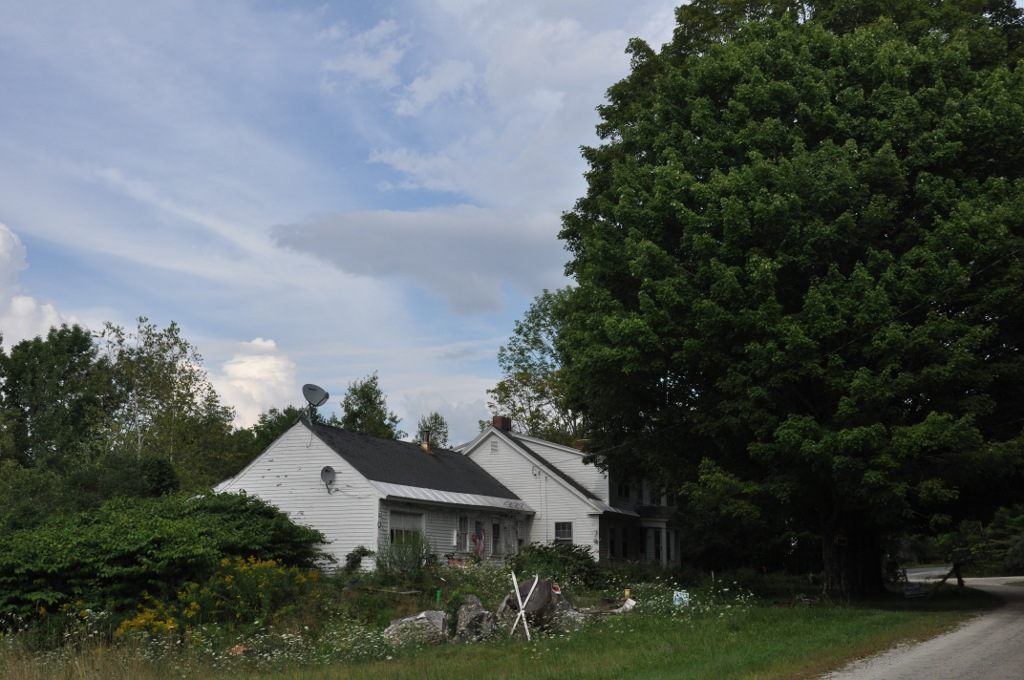

- Location within New Hampshire Location within the United States
- Location: Ball Park Rd., Goshen, New Hampshire
- Coordinates: 43°16′32″N 72°8′3″W
- Area: 8 acres (3.2 ha)
- Built: 1860
- Architect: John Chandler
- Architectural style: Greek Revival, Cape
- MPS: Plank Houses of Goshen New Hampshire TR
- NRHP reference No.: 85001312
- Added to NRHP: June 21, 1985

The Durham House is a historic house on Ball Park Road in Goshen, New Hampshire. Built about 1860, it is one of a cluster of plank-frame houses built in the rural community in the 19th century. This one is further note for its Greek Revival features, and its construction is tentatively ascribed to James Chandler, a noted local builder. The house was listed on the National Register of Historic Places in 1985.

== Description and history ==
The Durham House is located south of the village center of Goshen, at the northwest corner of Ball Park Road and New Hampshire Route 31. Its main block is a 1 1/2-story Cape style wooden structure, with a gabled roof and two chimneys, measuring about 32 by 24 feet (9.8 m × 7.3 m). Its walls are formed out of 3-inch wooden planks placed vertically, with lateral stability provided by wooden dowels. The exterior is finished in clapboard siding. The main facade is five bays wide, with sash windows flanking a center entrance. The entry has a six-panel door and full-length sidelight windows, and is sheltered by a gabled portico. Shed dormers adorn the front and rear roofs, and there is a garage extending to the left and a single-story enclosed porch to the rear.

This house was built about 1860, and is one of the finer examples of the town's plank-frame houses. The house may have been built by James Chandler, a local builder known for this construction method, whose mill and quarry were not far away. The Greek Revival features of the entry are an unusual feature of the houses in this collection.

== See also ==
- National Register of Historic Places listings in Sullivan County, New Hampshire
