= Covit House =

Historic house in New Hampshire, United States

- U.S. National Register of Historic Places
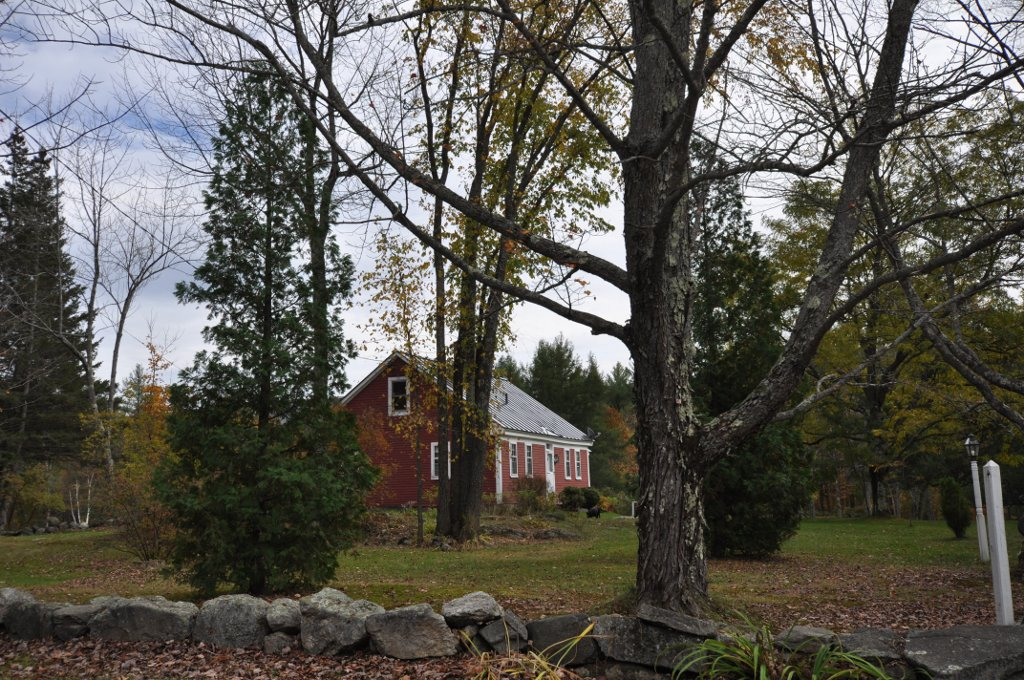

- Location within New Hampshire Location within the United States
- Location: Goshen Center Rd., Goshen, New Hampshire
- Coordinates: 43.29546°N 72.11505°W
- Area: 20 acres (8.1 ha)
- Built: 1800
- MPS: Plank Houses of Goshen New Hampshire TR
- NRHP reference No.: 85001311
- Added to NRHP: June 21, 1985

The Covit House is a historic house on Goshen Center Road in Goshen, New Hampshire. Built about 1800, it is one of the oldest surviving and best-preserved plank-frame houses in the town. The house was listed on the National Register of Historic Places in 1985.

== Description and history ==
The Covit House is located on the south side of Goshen Center Road, about 1.5 miles (2.4 km) east of New Hampshire Route 31. It is set on 20 acres (8.1 ha) of fields and woodland near a small fish pond. It is a 1 1/2-story wooden structure, with a clapboarded exterior, gabled roof and brick central chimney. It is oriented facing west, just west of the fish pond. The main facade is five bays wide, with pairs of sash windows flanking the main entry. The entry is simply framed, with a four-light transom window above the door. The building's main block is 28 feet (8.5 m) by 24 feet (7.3 m), and its structure is composed of vertically oriented 3-inch wooden planking (instead of more typical stud framing), which is given lateral stability by the horizontal insertion of dowels through the planking.

The house is one of a significant cluster of 19th-century plank-framed houses and is one of the oldest and best-preserved in the town. It was built about 1800, and was reported to be in excellent condition at the time it was listed on the National Register in 1985.

== See also ==
- National Register of Historic Places listings in Sullivan County, New Hampshire
