= Seavey House =

Seavey House may refer to:

in the United States (by state then city)

- Seavey House (Goshen, New Hampshire), listed on the National Register of Historic Places (NRHP) in Sullivan County
- A. B. Seavey House, Saco, Maine, listed on the NRHP in York County
- Seavey-Robinson House, South Portland, Maine, listed on the NRHP in Cumberland County
- Dr. John B. Seavey House and Cemetery, Harrells, North Carolina, listed on the NRHP in Sampson County
