= Richards, Dexter, & Sons Woolen Mill =

- U.S. National Register of Historic Places
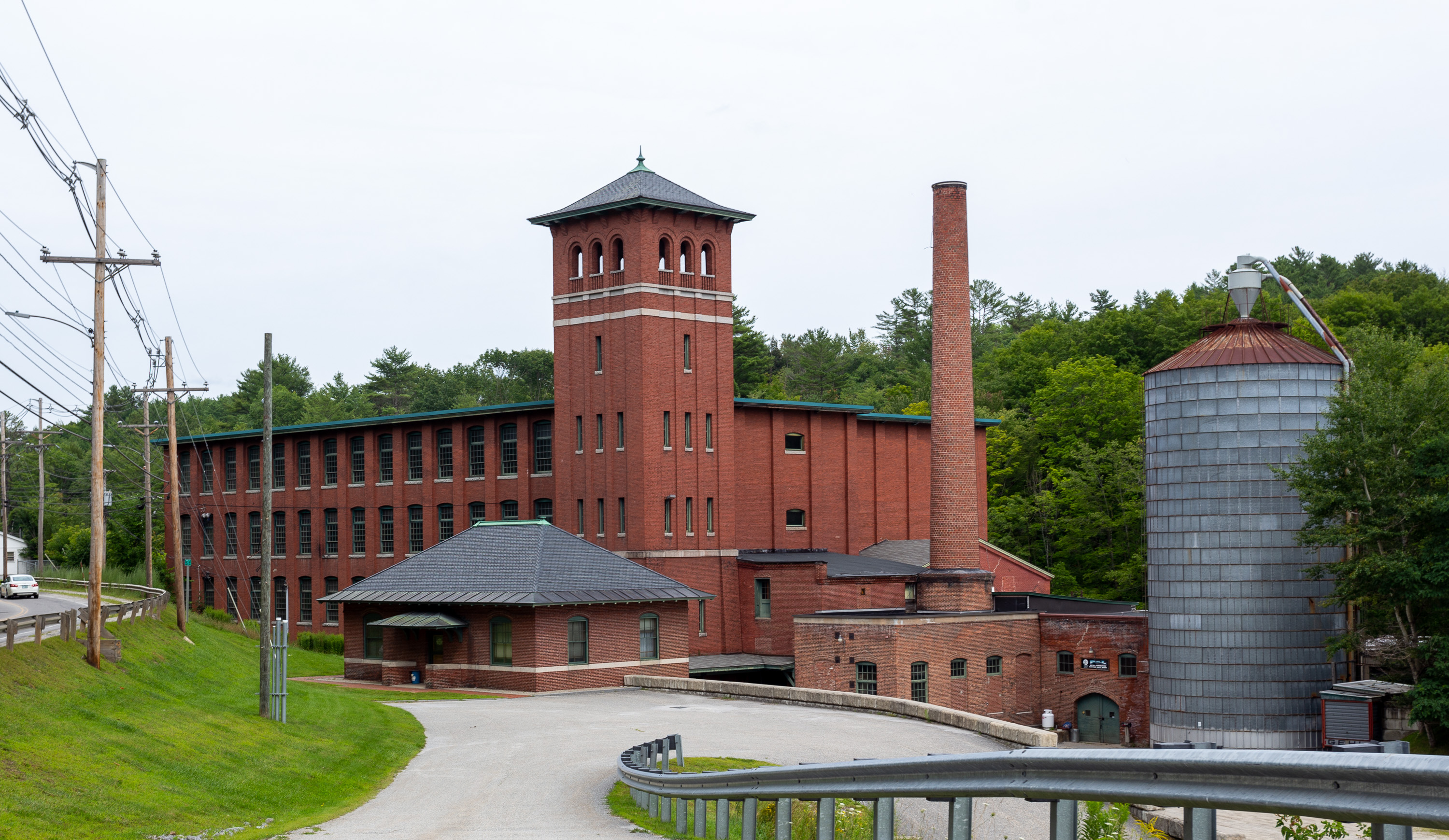

- Location within New Hampshire Location within the United States
- Location: 169 Sunapee St., Newport, New Hampshire
- Coordinates: 43°21′58″N 72°9′50″W
- Built: 1905
- Architectural style: Renaissance Revival
- NRHP reference No.: 100000468
- Added to NRHP: January 17, 2017

The Richards, Dexter, & Sons Woolen Mill, also known locally as the Dexter Mill, is a historic industrial property at 169 Sunapee Street in Newport, New Hampshire. Built in 1905, it is a well-preserved example of period mill architecture, which served as an important area employer for many years. The property was listed on the National Register of Historic Places in 1985.

== Description and history ==
The Dexter Mill is located about 0.5 miles (0.80 km) east of downtown Newport, with Sunapee Street (New Hampshire Routes 11 and 103) to the north and the Sugar River to the south. The complex includes the main mill building, an office building, and a dam across the river. The primary structure is a three-story brick building, with a five-story tower at the southwest corner. The tower has narrow round-arch windows at its lower levels, and has an open fifth level with banks of larger round-arch openings. Connected to the mill via a tunnel is a small brick office building. The dam across the river is a concrete structure built in 1948, replacing an older stone structure, some of whose remains are still visible.

The mill site east of Newport has a documented industrial history back to at least 1848, when the first known mill was built at the site. The present mill building was constructed in 1905 for the Richards family, prominent local businessmen and industrialists. It was designed by Peterborough native Edward A. Buss, and is stylistically typical of industrial buildings of the period. The Richards family operated the mill until 1926, after which a consortium produced woolen goods using the name Gordon Woolen Mill.

== See also ==
- National Register of Historic Places listings in Sullivan County, New Hampshire
