= Backside Inn =

Historic house in New Hampshire, United States

- U.S. National Register of Historic Places
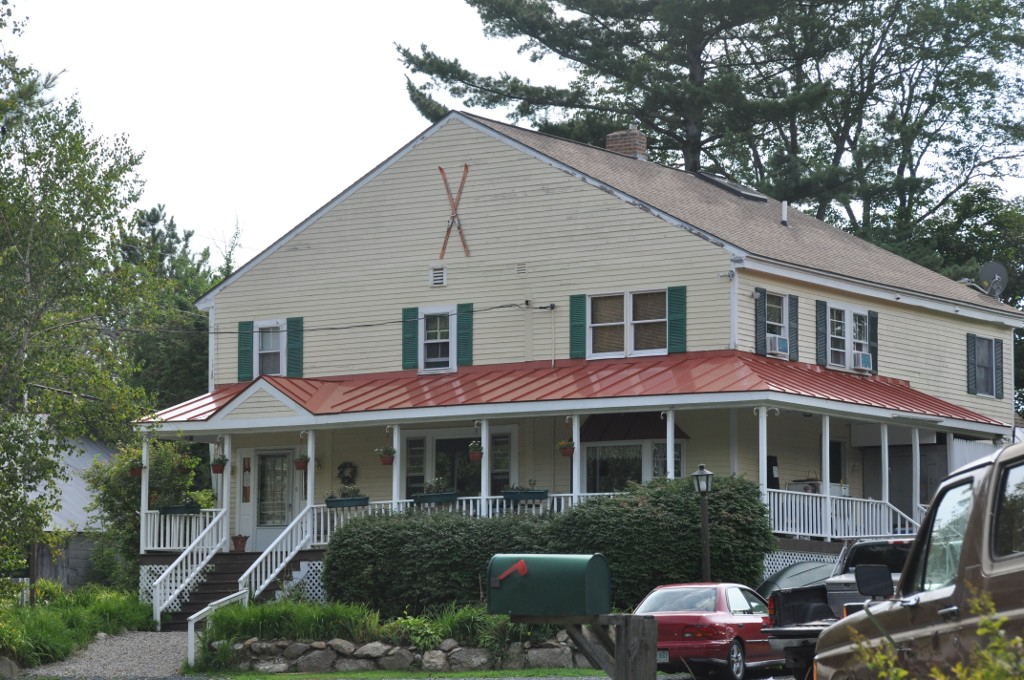

- Location within New Hampshire Location within the United States
- Location: 1171 Brook Rd., Goshen, New Hampshire
- Coordinates: 43°18′47″N 72°6′51″W
- Area: 4 acres (1.6 ha)
- MPS: Plank Houses of Goshen New Hampshire TR
- NRHP reference No.: 85001308
- Added to NRHP: June 21, 1985

The Brook Road Inn, formerly the Backside Inn, is a historic inn at 1171 Brook Road in Goshen, New Hampshire. The inn, which now provides lodging only, is located in an 1835 farmhouse that is one of a regional cluster of 19th-century plank frame houses. The inn was listed on the National Register of Historic Places in 1985.

== Description and history ==
The Brook Road Inn is located in a rural setting of northeastern Goshen, just west of the junction of Brook and Dubois roads. It consists of a 1 1/2-story plank-framed structure, to which a larger two-story ell has been attached. The original house's walls are formed structurally out of 3-inch wooden planking and covered in wooden clapboards. It is covered by a gabled roof, with gabled dormers projection from the front and a shed-roof dormer to the rear. A porch extends across the facade of the ell partially along one side. The ell's main facade is three bays wide, with an assortment of older and modern windows occupying most of the bays, and the inn's main entrance in the leftmost bay.

The oldest portion of the building was built in 1835 as a farmhouse, with a small kitchen ell where the larger one now stands. It is one of a significant concentration of plank-framed houses in the area. The building was adapted for use as a hunting lodge in the 1920s, and the ell was greatly expanded in the 1950s or 1960s. The inn's historic name comes from its location, which is on the "back side" of the nearby Mount Sunapee resort area.

== See also ==
- National Register of Historic Places listings in Sullivan County, New Hampshire
