= Washington Common Historic District =

Historic district in New Hampshire, United States

- U.S. National Register of Historic Places
- U.S. Historic district
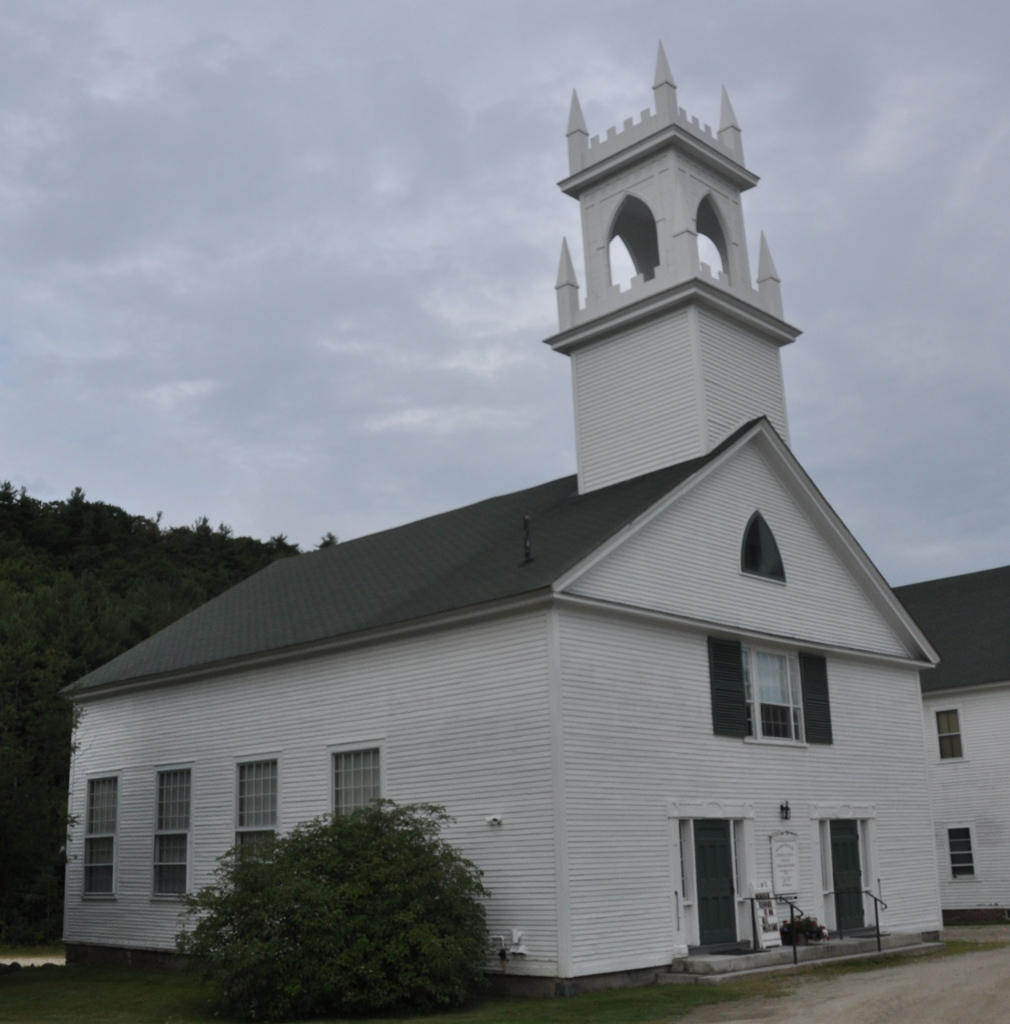
- The Congregational Church

- Location within New Hampshire Location within the United States
- Location: Jct. of Half Moon Pond and Millen Pond Rds., Washington, New Hampshire
- Coordinates: 43°10′34″N 72°5′47″W
- Area: 2.2 acres (0.89 ha)
- Built: 1787
- Architect: Cook, Peter; Et al.
- NRHP reference No.: 86000345
- Added to NRHP: March 14, 1986

The Washington Common Historic District encompasses a cluster of three civic buildings and the town common in the center of Washington, New Hampshire. The town common began as a 2-acre (0.81 ha) parcel acquired in 1787, and the current town hall followed in 1789. It is a two-story wood-frame building which originally served as both a civic and religious meeting house. The adjacent Gothic Revival Congregational Church was built in 1840. The third structure is the Schoolhouse, a 2 1/2-story two-room school built in 1883. The district was listed on the National Register of Historic Places in 1986.

== Buildings ==
Washington's town common is a two-acre parcel purchased from a local farmer in 1787. It is located at the junction of New Hampshire Route 31 and Half Moon Pond Road, and is a roughly oval grassy area, fringed on the north by the gravel access road for the public buildings that line its north side. On the right is the town hall, a rectangular two-story gable-roofed structure. When built, its main entrance was on the long side facing the common, and there was no tower. The tower projects from the west facade, rising as a square above the main ridge, with two open octagonal stages capped by a bell-shaped cupola above. The tower was added in 1820, and in 1843 the gallery space was converted into a full second story. Despite these changes, elements of the original galleries and box pews survive. It is believed to be one of the oldest meeting houses in the state to still be in active civic use.

To the left of the town hall stands the school, with its gable end facing the common. There are two entrances on the front facade, set near the building corners. A small belfry with shallow pyramidal roof rises above the main roof ridge. The school was built as a one-room schoolhouse, with the upper floor used for a variety of other purposes before c. 1960, when it was turned into a second classroom. An ell extends to the rear, providing space for modern plumbing and heating.

The Congregational church stands at the left (west) end of the assemblage. Its principal Gothic features are the fan in the front gable, and the pointed-arch openings in the belfry of the tower. The pyramidal pinnacles found at the tower corners are also a Gothic feature.

The common was historically lined with a larger number of buildings, but a major fire in 1830 destroyed 21 buildings and damaged the meeting house.

== See also ==
- National Register of Historic Places listings in Sullivan County, New Hampshire
