= Knights-Morey House =

Historic house in New Hampshire, United States

- U.S. National Register of Historic Places
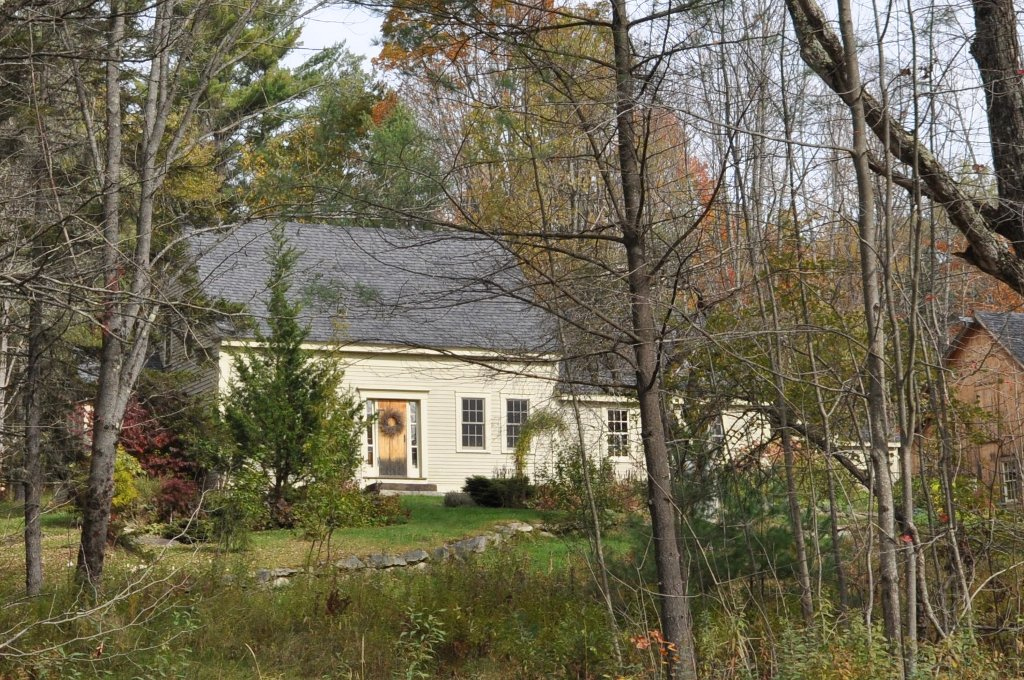

- Location within New Hampshire Location within the United States
- Location: Province Rd., Goshen, New Hampshire
- Coordinates: 43°19′47″N 72°6′21″W
- Area: 20 acres (8.1 ha)
- Built: 1830
- Architectural style: Cape
- MPS: Plank Houses of Goshen New Hampshire TR
- NRHP reference No.: 85001316
- Added to NRHP: June 21, 1985

The Knights-Morey House is a historic house on Province Road in Goshen, New Hampshire. Built about 1830, it is one of a regionally distinctive cluster of plank-frame house, with a number of features unusual within that cluster. The house was listed on the National Register of Historic Places in 1985.

== Description and history ==
The Knights-Morey House is located in a remote rural setting of northern Goshen, on the north side of Province Road about 0.3 miles (0.48 km) east of its junction with Badger Road. It is a 1 1/2-story wooden structure, with a clapboarded exterior and gabled roof. The roof is steeply pitched, enabling the space beneath to house a chamber running the width of the house. The structure's framing consists of wooden planks three inches thick, placed vertically with horizontal dowels for lateral stability. It has two brick chimneys, one placed near the center, and another at the west end. The main facade is five bays wide, with sash windows arranged symmetrically on either side of the center entrance. The entry door is flanked by sidelight windows. A single-story ell, its front flush with that of the main block, extends to the right.

This house was built c. 1830, and is one of a regionally significant cluster of plank-frame houses found in the town. The house is locally distinct from other period plank-frame houses because of its high-pitch roof, and for the use of dowel-like posts to support the second-story room.

== See also ==
- National Register of Historic Places listings in Sullivan County, New Hampshire
