= Pike House =

Historic house in New Hampshire, United States

- U.S. National Register of Historic Places
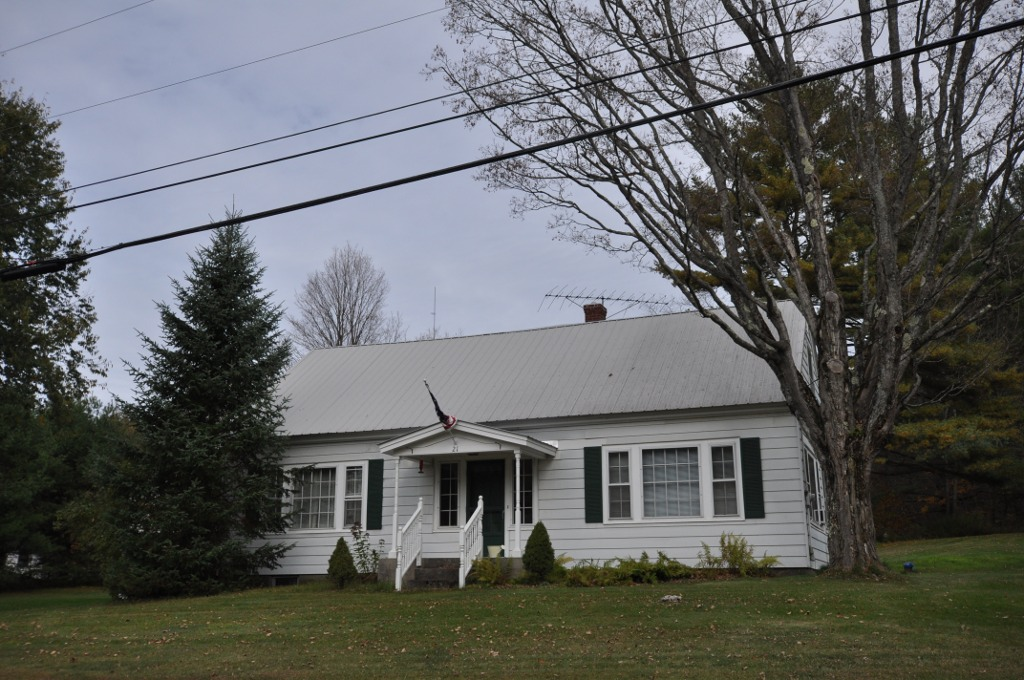

- Location within New Hampshire Location within the United States
- Location: NH 10, Goshen, New Hampshire
- Coordinates: 43°18′1″N 72°8′52″W
- Area: 6 acres (2.4 ha)
- Built: 1812
- MPS: Plank Houses of Goshen New Hampshire TR
- NRHP reference No.: 85001318
- Added to NRHP: June 21, 1985

The Pike House is a historic house, located on New Hampshire Route 10 in the village of Goshen, New Hampshire. Built about 1812, it is one of a cluster of 19th-century plank-frame houses in the rural community. The house was listed on the National Register of Historic Places in 1985.

== Description and history ==
The Pike House is located near the southern edge of the village of Goshen, on the east side of NH 10 a short way south of its junction with Brook Road. It is a 1 1/2-story wooden structure, with a gabled roof and exterior finished in aluminum siding. The walls are framed with three-inch wood planking, oriented vertically, with dowels placed horizontally for lateral stability. It originally had two windows on either side of the central door; these have been replaced with modern multi-pane windows. The entry is sheltered by a gabled porch with turned posts, and is flanked by sidelight windows. One brick chimney rises off-center through the rear roof face, and another is set at one end. Attached to this main block are a connecting ell and garage of modern construction.

The house was built about 1812, probably by Oliver Brooks around the time of his marriage. In the first half of the 20th century, it was the home of Althine Sholes Lear, a locally prominent poet.

== See also ==
- National Register of Historic Places listings in Sullivan County, New Hampshire
