= Garber House =

Garber House may refer to:

- Garber House (Los Angeles, California), a Los Angeles Historic-Cultural Monument
- Garber House (Goshen, New Hampshire), listed on the National Register of Historic Places in Sullivan County, New Hampshire
- Garber House (Woodinville, Washington), located at the highest point in King County, Washington
