= Janicke House =

Historic house in New Hampshire, United States

- U.S. National Register of Historic Places
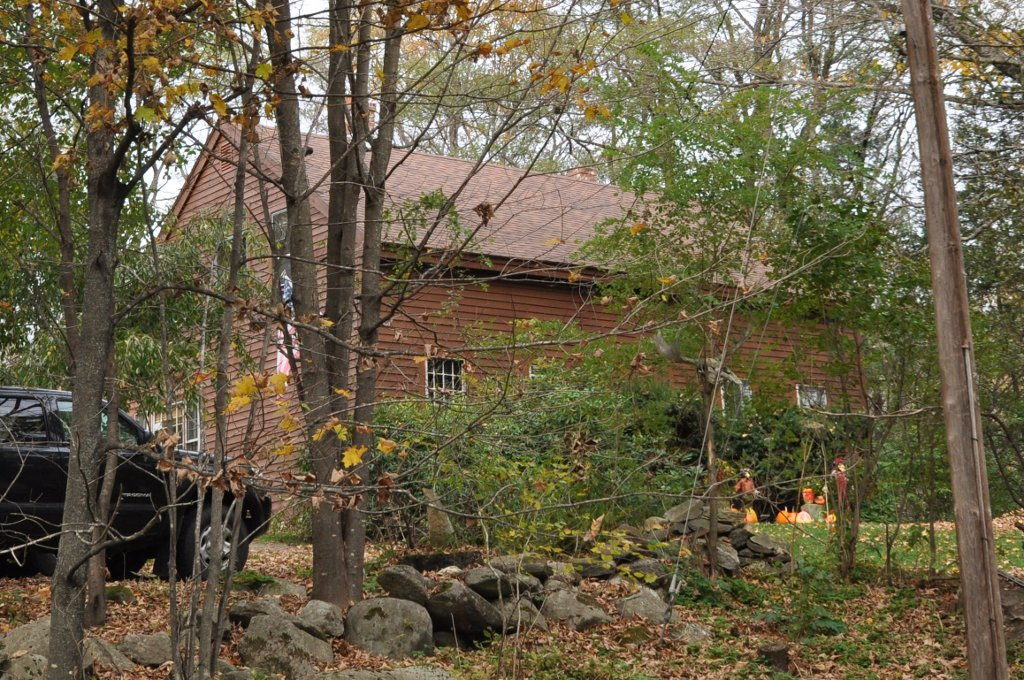

- Location within New Hampshire Location within the United States
- Location: Goshen Center Rd., Goshen, New Hampshire
- Coordinates: 43°17′47″N 72°6′55″W
- Area: 7 acres (2.8 ha)
- Built: 1830
- MPS: Plank Houses of Goshen New Hampshire TR
- NRHP reference No.: 85001315
- Added to NRHP: June 21, 1985

The Janicke House is a historic house on Goshen Center Road in Goshen, New Hampshire. Built about 1830, it is one of a regionally distinctive cluster of plank-frame houses built in the 19th century. The house was listed on the National Register of Historic Places in 1985.

== Description and history ==
The Janicke House is located in a rural setting of central Goshen, on the north side of Goshen Center Road, about 1.6 miles (2.6 km) east of New Hampshire Route 31. It is set on a rise close to the road, from which it is separated by a fieldstone wall. It is a 1 1/2-story wooden structure, with a gabled roof and clapboarded exterior. It is about 36 by 25 feet (11.0 m × 7.6 m) in size, with about 2/3 of its walls formed out of wooden planks three inches thick that have been arrayed vertically, with dowels placed horizontally for lateral stability. The remaining walls were built using balloon framing, as part of a later expansion of the structure.

This house was built about 1830, and is one of three such houses to survive on Goshen Center Road. It is also one of the older such houses in Goshen, and may have served as an example for building John Chandler, a major local builder of plank-frame houses in the mid-19th century. There were originally as many as six plank-frame houses in the immediate area, of which three were destroyed by a major fire in the 1940s.

== See also ==
- National Register of Historic Places listings in Sullivan County, New Hampshire
