= Garber House (Goshen, New Hampshire) =

Historic house in New Hampshire, United States

- U.S. National Register of Historic Places
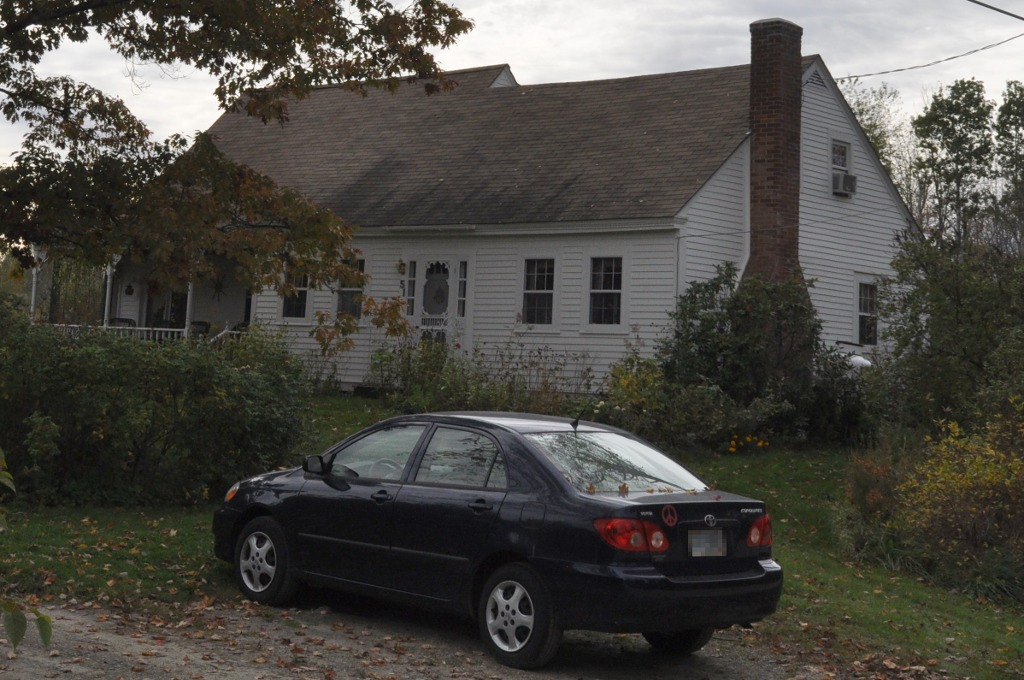

- Location within New Hampshire Location within the United States
- Location: Lempster Coach Road, Goshen, New Hampshire
- Coordinates: 43°16′43″N 72°7′56″W
- Area: 56.5 acres (22.9 ha)
- Built: 1835
- Architectural style: Greek Revival
- MPS: Plank Houses of Goshen New Hampshire TR
- NRHP reference No.: 85001313
- Added to NRHP: June 21, 1985

The Garber House is a historic house on Lempster Coach Road in Goshen, New Hampshire. Built about 1835, it is one of a cluster of plank-frame houses in the rural community, which at one time had an unusually fine Greek Revival entry surround. The house was listed on the National Register of Historic Places on June 21, 1985.

== Description and history ==
The Garber House stands on more than 56 acres (23 ha) in rural southern Goshen, on the west side of Lempster Coach Road, about 0.25 miles (0.40 km) south of its junction with New Hampshire Route 31. It is a 1 1/2-story wooden structure, with a gabled roof, clapboarded exterior, and central chimney. The walls are formed out of vertically oriented wooden planking which is three inches think, with lateral stability provided by wooden dowels. It is five bays wide, with the center entrance flanked by sash windows. The entry has sidelight windows, and originally had a more elaborate Greek Revival framing. An ell, possibly once a small barn, extends to the west of the main block at a recess, with a covered porch in front.

The house was built about 1835, and is one of a cluster of houses built using this unusual construction method in Goshen. Its sophisticated Greek Revival entry surround was one of just two identified in the town during an architectural survey performed in the 1980s (the other is the Burford House).

== See also ==
- National Register of Historic Places listings in Sullivan County, New Hampshire
