= Springfield Town Hall and Howard Memorial Methodist Church =

Historic church in New Hampshire, United States

- U.S. National Register of Historic Places
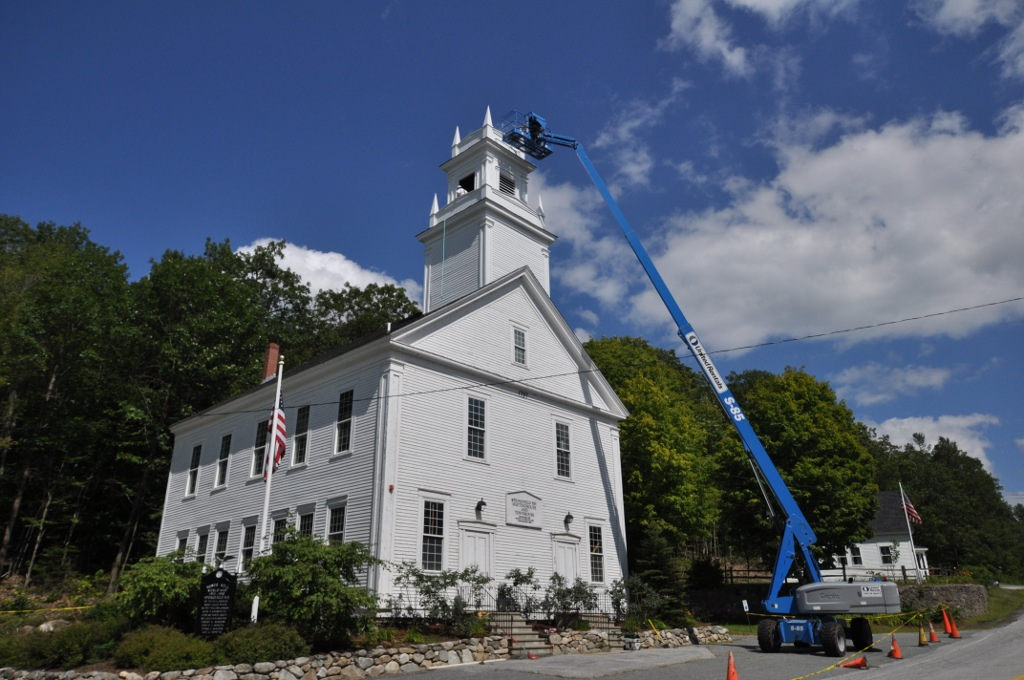

- Location within New Hampshire Location within the United States
- Location: Four Corners Rd., Springfield, New Hampshire
- Coordinates: 43°29′43″N 72°2′55″W
- Area: 0.4 acres (0.16 ha)
- Built: 1797
- Architectural style: Greek Revival, Gothic Revival
- NRHP reference No.: 86001235
- Added to NRHP: June 05, 1986

The Springfield Town Hall and Howard Memorial Methodist Church, also known as the Springfield Union Meeting House, is a historic civic and religious building on Four Corners Road in Springfield, New Hampshire, USA. Built about 1797 and restyled in 1851, it is a rare surviving example in the state of a meeting house whose functions include both civic and religious uses. It is also a good example of Greek Revival and Gothic architecture, and was listed on the National Register of Historic Places in 1986.

== Description and history ==
The Springfield Town Hall and Howard Memorial Methodist Church is located in the village center of Springfield, on the north side of Four Corners Road just north of its junction with Main Street (New Hampshire Route 114). It is a two-story wood-frame structure, with a clapboarded exterior and gable roof. Its main facade, now one of the gable ends, is symmetrical, with corner pilasters rising to an entablature. There are two entrances, each with a sash window separating it from the near corner, and a second sash window on the second level. The original main facade is on the left side, with three windows on either side of an entrance. The interior is divided into municipal spaces on the ground floor, including the original sanctuary floor, where pews have been removed and a stage added at the rear of the building. The second floor houses the church sanctuary, which includes a demarcated space at the rear for Sunday School use. A two-stage square tower with Gothic corner pinnacles rises above the front.

The town approved construction of a meeting house in 1794, but it was not ready for first use until 1797, and was originally located near the town's first burying ground, about 0.5 miles (0.80 km) to the east. It was dedicated in 1799, and was not paid off until after 1801.

It underwent major alterations after being moved to its present location in 1851, at which time it was given its present Greek Revival and Gothic features. The upper level space continues to be used in the summer for religious services.

== See also ==
- National Register of Historic Places listings in Sullivan County, New Hampshire
