= Nettleton House =

Historic house in New Hampshire, United States

- U.S. National Register of Historic Places
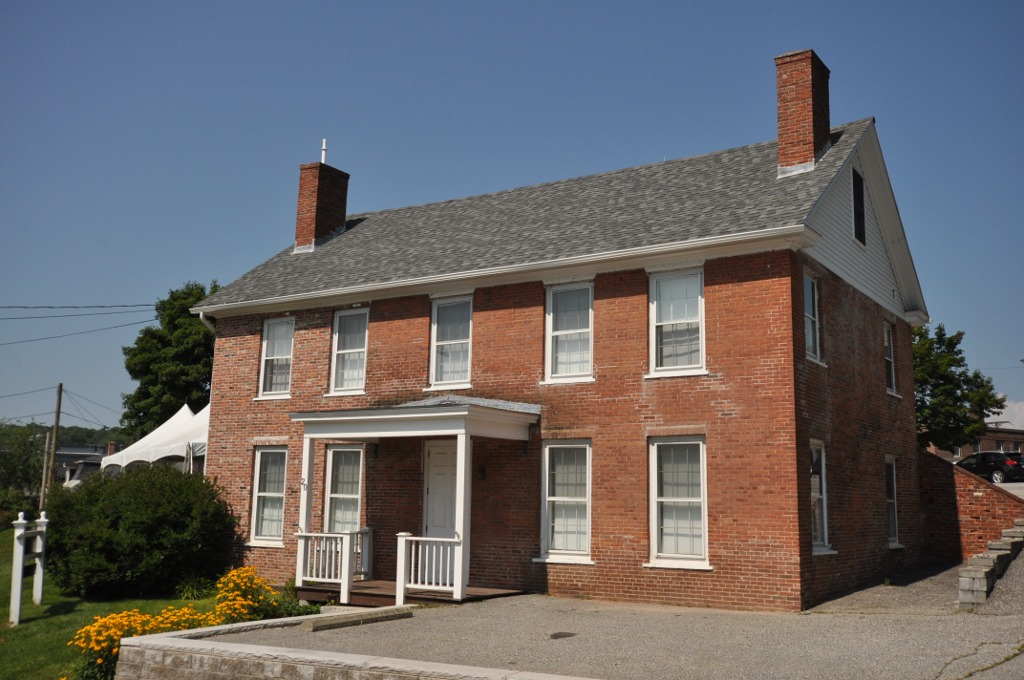

- Location within New Hampshire Location within the United States
- Location: 20 Central St., Newport, New Hampshire
- Coordinates: 43°21′51″N 72°10′19″W
- Area: 0.2 acres (0.081 ha)
- Built: 1835
- Architectural style: Federal
- NRHP reference No.: 77000164
- Added to NRHP: November 16, 1977

The Nettleton House is a historic house at 20 Central Street in Newport, New Hampshire. The two-story brick structure was probably built in the 1830s, since it exhibits a commonality of materials and construction techniques with the nearby former county courthouse, which was built in 1824. It was probably built by Joel Nettleton, and is referred to in deeds as the Nettleton homestead. Nettleton operated a tavern and stage coach. The house, listed on the National Register of Historic Places in 1977, is now home to the Newport Historical Society Museum.

== Description and history ==
The Nettleton House is located between Newport's old courthouse and the Sugar River, on the north side of Central Street roughly midway between Main and Sunapee streets. The house is a two-story brick structure, built using laying practices also found in the courthouse. It is built into a hillside, and presents only a single story to the rear, facing the courthouse. The main facade, facing the street, is five bays wide, with windows arranged symmetrically around a central entrance. The entry is sheltered by a hip-roof portico with square posts and a simple wooden balustrade. The interior retains many original features, including Federal-style fireplace mantel surrounds.

The house was probably built in the 1830s, based on the similarity of construction styles to the 1824 courthouse, and to its combination of late Federal and early Greek Revival features. It was built for Joel Nettleton, a local hotel and stage coach owner, either by Nettleton himself, or by Samuel George, a local cabinetmaker and painter. The building is visually harmonious with the other nearby civic buildings, which were also built out of red brick.

== See also ==
- National Register of Historic Places listings in Sullivan County, New Hampshire
