= Langdon Meeting House =

Historic church in New Hampshire, United States

- U.S. National Register of Historic Places
- NH State Register of Historic Places
- Location within New Hampshire Location within the United States
- Location: 5 Walker Hill Rd., Langdon, New Hampshire
- Coordinates: 43°10′0″N 72°22′47″W
- Built: 1801
- Architectural style: Federal
- NRHP reference No.: 100004859

Significant dates
- Added to NRHP: January 9, 2020
- Designated NHSRHP: July 30, 2012

The Langdon Meeting House is a historic meeting house and former church at 5 Walker Hill Road in Langdon, New Hampshire. Completed in 1803 as a combination town hall and church, it is now a multifunction space owned by the town, and is claimed by the town to hold the record for consecutive town meetings held in the same space. The building was listed on the National Register of Historic Places in 2020, and the New Hampshire State Register of Historic Places in 2012.

== Description and history ==
The Langdon Meeting House stands in the town's village center, on the north side of Walker Hill Road just east its junction with Holden Hill Road and Village Road. It is a two-story wood-frame structure, with a gabled roof and clapboarded exterior. Its current main facade faces Holden Hill Road, and is a gable end with a five-bay facade. Sash windows are arranged symmetrically around the centered entrance, the windows topped by shallow projecting cornices, and the entry sheltered by a hip-roofed porch supported by square columns. The secondary facade facing Walker Hill Road, its original main facade, is seven bays wide with a center entrance framed by pilasters and topped by an entablature and gabled cornice.

The meeting house was built in 1801–03, originally to house both town functions and the local church. It had entrances on the east, south, and west sides, and had a gallery level accessed by enclosed stairs on the east and west sides. In 1851 the religious and municipal functions were formally separated; the congregation purchased a portion of the ground floor, and converted the gallery level into a full second floor, creating a new sanctuary. The remaining portions of the ground floor were given over to town offices. Both of these functions were eventually moved to other locations, with the town taking full ownership of the building. The town continues to use the building for its annual town meetings, claiming to hold the record for consecutive meetings held in the same building.

== See also ==
- National Register of Historic Places listings in Sullivan County, New Hampshire
