= Scranton House =

Historic house in New Hampshire, United States

- U.S. National Register of Historic Places
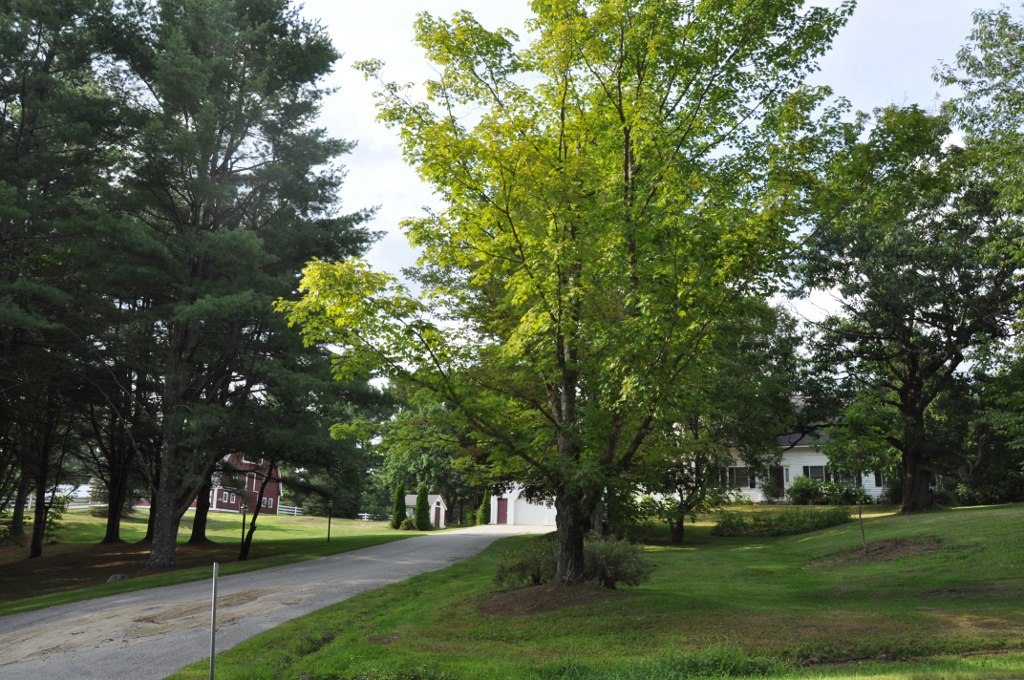

- Location within New Hampshire Location within the United States
- Location: 711 Brook Rd., Goshen, New Hampshire
- Coordinates: 43°18′42″N 72°7′49″W
- Area: 85 acres (34 ha)
- Built: 1850
- MPS: Plank Houses of Goshen New Hampshire TR
- NRHP reference No.: 85001320
- Added to NRHP: June 21, 1985

The Scranton House is a historic house at 711 Brook Road in Goshen, New Hampshire. Built about 1850, it is one of a cluster of plank-frame houses in Goshen, and is unusual in that group for its use of thinner planking. The house was listed on the National Register of Historic Places in 1985.

== Description and history ==
The Scranton House is located in a rural setting of northeastern Goshen, on the north side of Brook Road about 0.5 miles (0.80 km) east of its junction with Province Road. It is a 1 1/2-story Cape-style wooden structure, with a gabled roof and clapboarded exterior. It is 53 feet (16 m) wide, with a seven-bay facade, with a 20th-century entry one bay left of center. Windows are sash, and a brick chimney rises against the right side. The house framing consists of planking (1.25 to 1.5-inch vs. a more typical 3-inch found in other Goshen plank-frame houses) oriented vertically, with dowels placed horizontally for lateral stability. A 20th-century two-car garage is attached to the left side at a recess, and the property also includes a horse barn.

The house was built about 1850, and originally was clad in vertical board-and-batten siding, with a relatively fine Greek Revival entrance surround. Both of these features survived into the mid-20th century before their replacement.

== See also ==
- National Register of Historic Places listings in Sullivan County, New Hampshire
