= Welcome Acres =

Historic house in New Hampshire, United States

- U.S. National Register of Historic Places
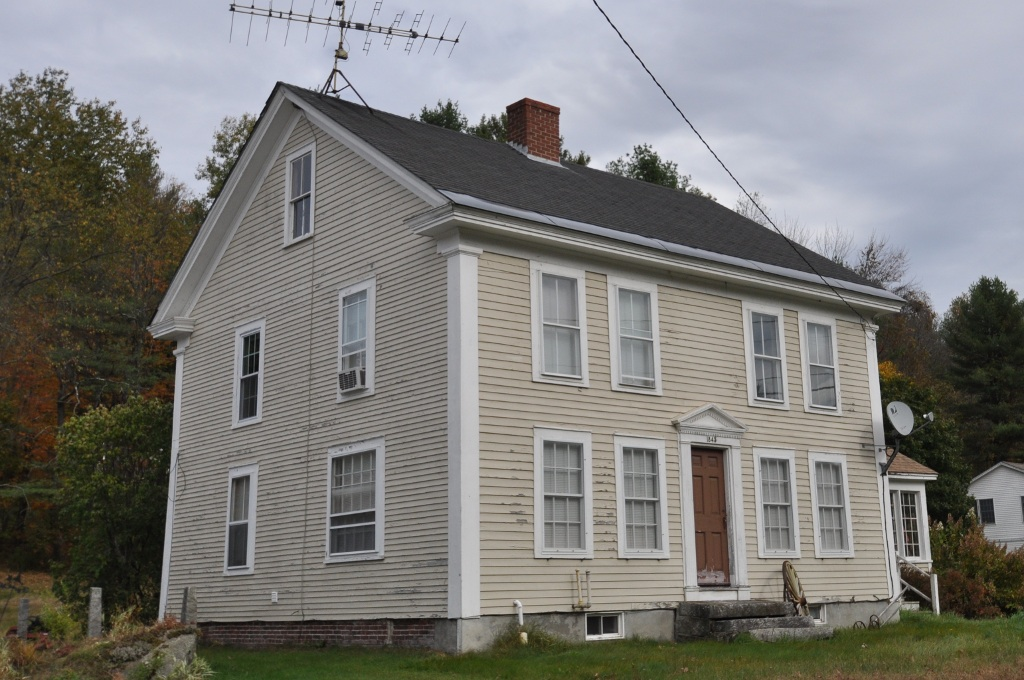

- Location within New Hampshire Location within the United States
- Location: NH 10, Goshen, New Hampshire
- Coordinates: 43°18′16″N 72°9′14″W
- Area: 1 acre (0.40 ha)
- Built: 1835
- MPS: Plank Houses of Goshen New Hampshire TR
- NRHP reference No.: 85001323
- Added to NRHP: June 21, 1985

Welcome Acres is a historic house in Goshen, New Hampshire. It is located on the east side of New Hampshire Route 10, about 1/2 mile north of its junction with Brook Road. Built c. 1835, it is one of a cluster of plank-frame houses in the community, and is unusual in that set for being two stories high, and for its unusual construction. The house was listed on the National Register of Historic Places in 1985.

== Description and history ==
Welcome Acres is located north of the village center of Goshen, on the east side of NH 10. It is a 2 1/2-story wooden structure, with a gabled roof and clapboarded exterior. It has a central brick chimney, and a single-story ell extending to the right. It is framed with three-inch planking laid horizontally, one of only two houses in Goshen's cluster of plank-frame houses where the planks are not set vertically. The house is five bays wide and two deep, and occupies a prominent position in the Mill Village section of Goshen. The main facade is symmetrical, with sash windows flanking the center entry. The entry is a modern door, flanked by pilasters which rise to a peaked entablature. The second level has no window above the entry. The building corners also have pilasters, which rise to the main roof ridge, which has Greek Revival style returns on the sides.

The house was built about 1835.

== See also ==
- National Register of Historic Places listings in Sullivan County, New Hampshire
