= Little Red School House (Newport, New Hampshire) =

- Little Red School House 1835 District No. 7
- U.S. National Register of Historic Places
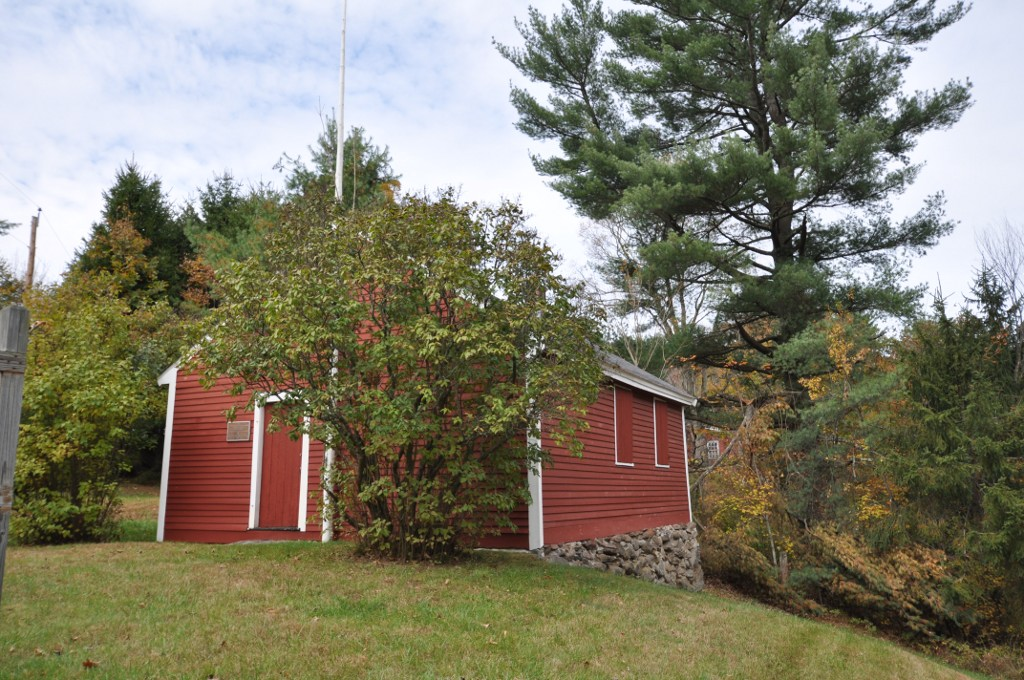

- Location within New Hampshire Location within the United States
- Location: NH 10 at Pollard Mills Rd., Newport, New Hampshire
- Coordinates: 43°20′8″N 72°10′6″W
- Area: 0.2 acres (0.081 ha)
- Built: 1835
- Built by: John Gilmore
- NRHP reference No.: 80000320
- Added to NRHP: December 1, 1980

The Little Red School House, or the District No. 7 Schoolhouse, is a one-room schoolhouse on New Hampshire Route 10, south of downtown Newport, New Hampshire. Built in 1835, it is one of the state's few surviving pre-1850 district schoolhouses, and one of the least-altered of that group. It served the city as a school until 1891, and was acquired in 1951 by the local chapter of the Daughters of the American Revolution. It is open as a museum during the summer months. The building was listed on the National Register of Historic Places in 1980.

== Description and history ==
Newport's Little Red School House is located about 2 miles (3.2 km) south of downtown Newport, at the northwest corner of New Hampshire Route 10 and Pollard Mills Road. It is a 1 1/2-story wood-frame structure resting on a fieldstone foundation, with a gabled roof and clapboarded exterior. The main façade, facing south, has the building's main entrance, while the sides and back each have two sash windows. The interior has plastered walls with a cove ceiling, and a painted wooden blackboard. The schoolhouse has its original wood stove, as well as original fittings for kerosene lamps. The benches are also original, but were moved in about 1885 to accommodate an additional wood stove. Exterior alterations are limited to the addition of folding shutters for the windows, and a flagpole near the entrance.

The school was built in 1835 to serve the town's seventh school district. Construction was done by a local carpenter for $140. Schools predating 1849 are rare in New Hampshire because the state in that year began promoting the construction of schools meeting standards specified in a publication by education pioneer Henry Barnard. This school remained in use until 1891, by which time Newport's rural population had declined enough to warrant adoption of a united school system.

== See also ==
- National Register of Historic Places listings in Sullivan County, New Hampshire
