= Protectworth Tavern =

Historic house in New Hampshire, United States

- U.S. National Register of Historic Places
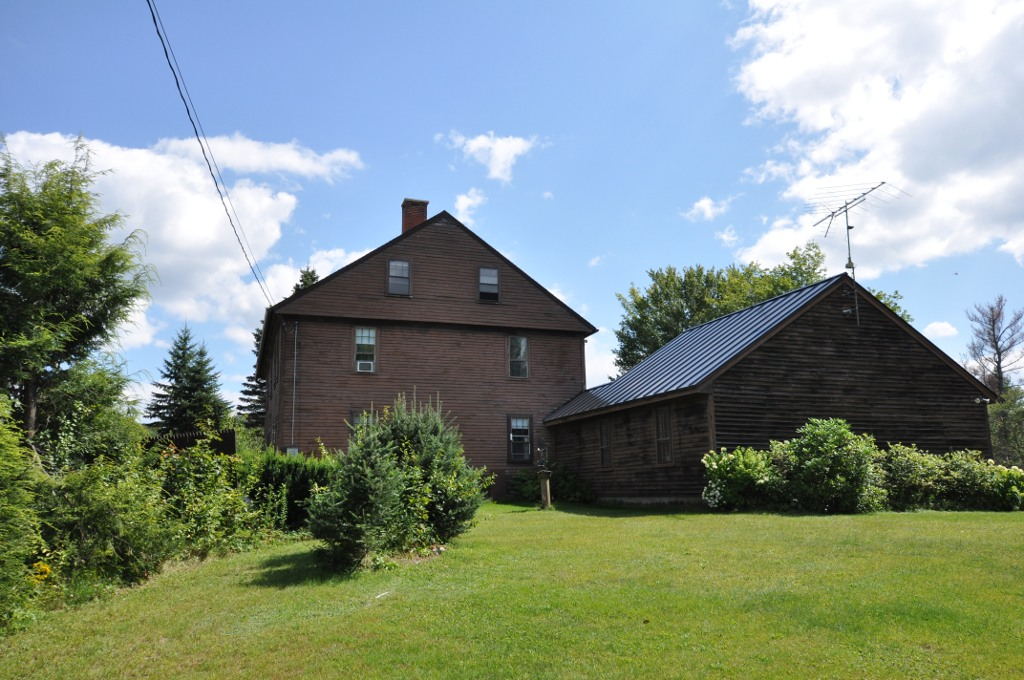

- Location within New Hampshire Location within the United States
- Location: NH 4A, Springfield, New Hampshire
- Coordinates: 43°30′37″N 72°2′3″W
- Area: 10 acres (4.0 ha)
- Architectural style: Georgian, Federal
- NRHP reference No.: 80000322
- Added to NRHP: November 25, 1980

The Protectworth Tavern, also known as the Stickney Tavern, is a historic house on New Hampshire Route 4A in Springfield, New Hampshire. It is a nearly-intact example of a late-Georgian early-Federal vernacular house, dating to the time of the construction of the "Fourth New Hampshire Turnpike", a major early highway through this region of central New Hampshire whose route is followed here by Route 4A. The house was long used as a tavern, and one of its early owners was Daniel Noyes, a proprietor of the Turnpike. Meetings of the Turnpike's owners are known to have taken place here. A later owner, Nathaniel Stickney, was also a stagecoach driver on the route. The house was listed on the National Register of Historic Places in 1980.

The tavern is located north of the village center of Springfield, on the west side of NH 4A. It is set at an angle to the road, which has been realigned since the tavern was built. It is a large 2 1/2-story wood-frame structure, with a gabled roof and clapboarded exterior. Brick chimneys rise through the front roof face. The main facade is five bays wide, with sash windows arranged symmetrically around the center entrance. The entrance is simply framed, with a transom window and slightly flared lintel. The interior has had only modest alterations, most notably the movement of a wall on the ground floor to increase the size of the room that originally housed the kitchen. Many original fixtures and finishes survive on both the first and second floors.

== See also ==
- National Register of Historic Places listings in Sullivan County, New Hampshire
