= Windswept Acres-Powers House =

Historic house in New Hampshire, United States

- U.S. National Register of Historic Places
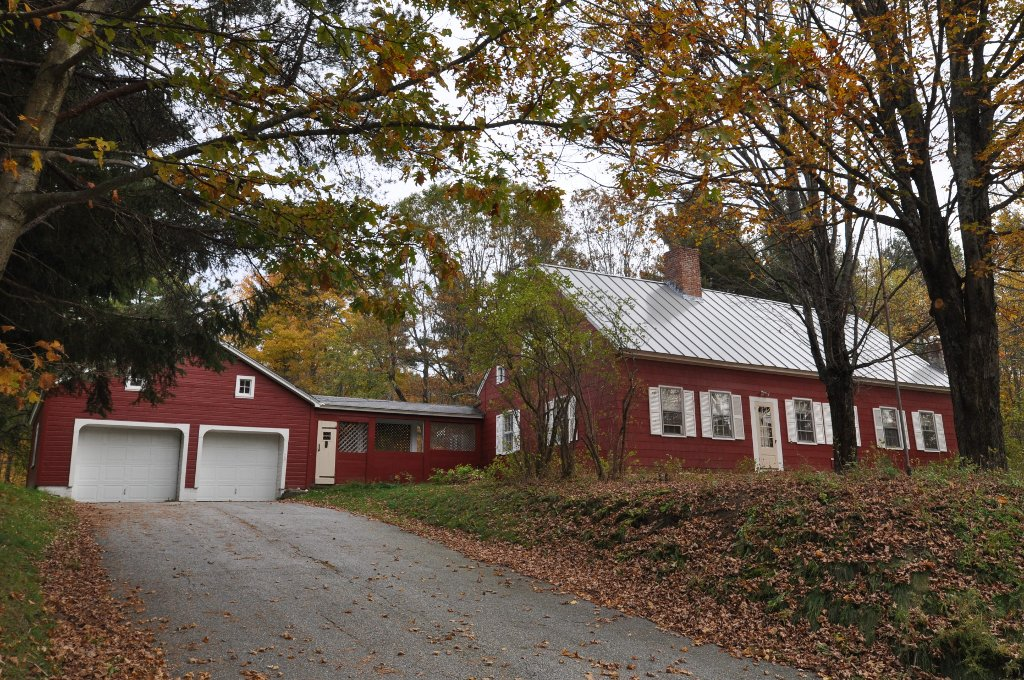

- Location within New Hampshire Location within the United States
- Location: NH 31, Goshen, New Hampshire
- Coordinates: 43.26059°N 72.11983°W
- Area: 48 acres (19 ha)
- Built: 1800
- MPS: Plank Houses of Goshen New Hampshire TR
- NRHP reference No.: 85001325
- Added to NRHP: June 21, 1985

Windswept Acres, or the Powers House, is a historic house on New Hampshire Route 31 in Goshen, New Hampshire. Built about 1800, it is one of Goshen's oldest houses, and one of a cluster of plank-frame houses in the community. The house was listed on the National Register of Historic Places in 1985.

== Description and history ==
Windswept Acres is located in a rural setting in southern Goshen, on the east side of New Hampshire Route 31 about 2 miles (3.2 km) south of its junction with New Hampshire Route 10. It is a 1 1/2-story Cape style plank-frame house, seven bays wide, with a gabled roof and shingled exterior. Its front entry is off-center, and is framed by simple molding and topped by a four-light transom window. There are two sash windows to its left and four to its right. A three-bay ell extends from the south of the main block, and there is an enclosed porch attached to the rear. A garage is connected to the north side of the house by a breezeway.

Built about 1800, the house is one of the oldest houses in Goshen. It is built with a distinctive horizontal plank framing method (as distinguished from other local examples where the framing is vertical) laid across a more typical box frame.

== See also ==
- National Register of Historic Places listings in Sullivan County, New Hampshire
