= Cote House =

Historic house in New Hampshire, United States

- U.S. National Register of Historic Places
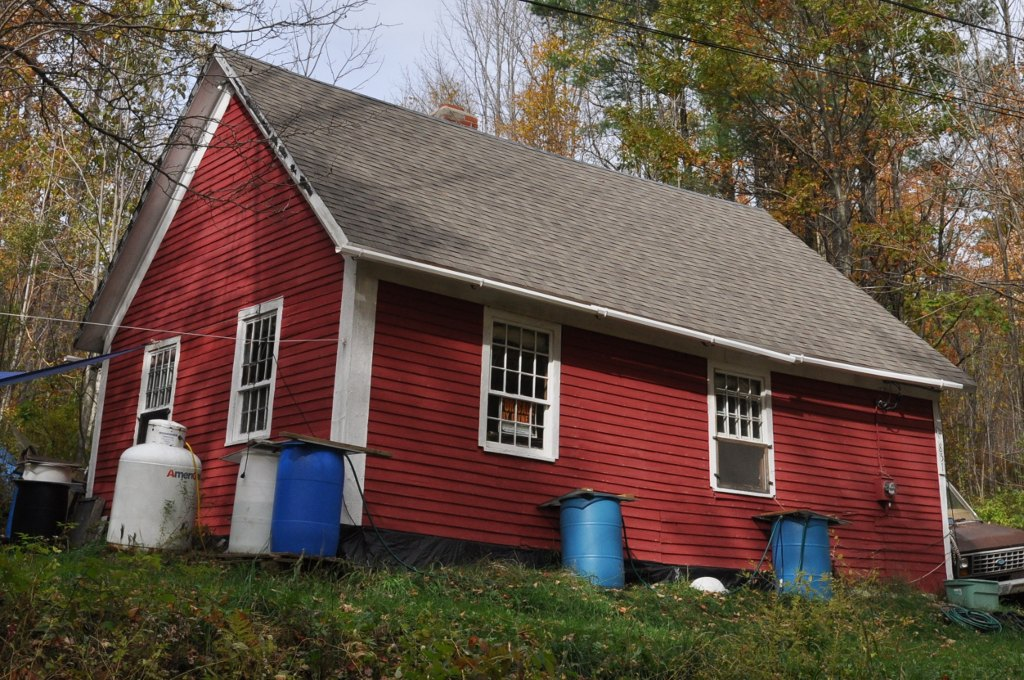

- Location within New Hampshire Location within the United States
- Location: Goshen Center Rd., Goshen, New Hampshire
- Coordinates: 43°17′44″N 72°7′3″W
- Area: 0.5 acres (0.20 ha)
- Built: 1846
- Built by: Chandler, John
- MPS: Plank Houses of Goshen New Hampshire TR
- NRHP reference No.: 85001310
- Added to NRHP: June 21, 1985

The Cote House is a historic house on Goshen Center Road in Goshen, New Hampshire. Built about 1846 as a schoolhouse, it is one of a cluster of plank-frame houses in Goshen. The building served as a school until 1926, and is now a private residence. The house was listed on the National Register of Historic Places in 1985.

== Description and history ==
The Cote House is located on the north side of Goshen Center Road, about 1.5 miles (2.4 km) east of New Hampshire Route 31. It is a 1 1/2-story wooden structure, with a gabled roof and clapboarded exterior. It measures just 24 feet (7.3 m) by 22 feet (6.7 m), with its walls framed by 3-inch-thick vertical planking given lateral stability by the horizontal placement of dowels. Each of its facades has two bays, most occupied by sash windows, with the main entrance on one of the gable ends.

The house was built about 1846, and originally served as the Goshen Center Schoolhouse. It was built by John Chambers, a local housewright known to use the plank-framing technique. The building served as a school until 1926, and is now a private residence. It is one of three surviving 19th-century schoolhouses in the town, out of five built.

== See also ==
- National Register of Historic Places listings in Sullivan County, New Hampshire
