= Lempster Meetinghouse =

Historic church in New Hampshire, United States

- U.S. National Register of Historic Places
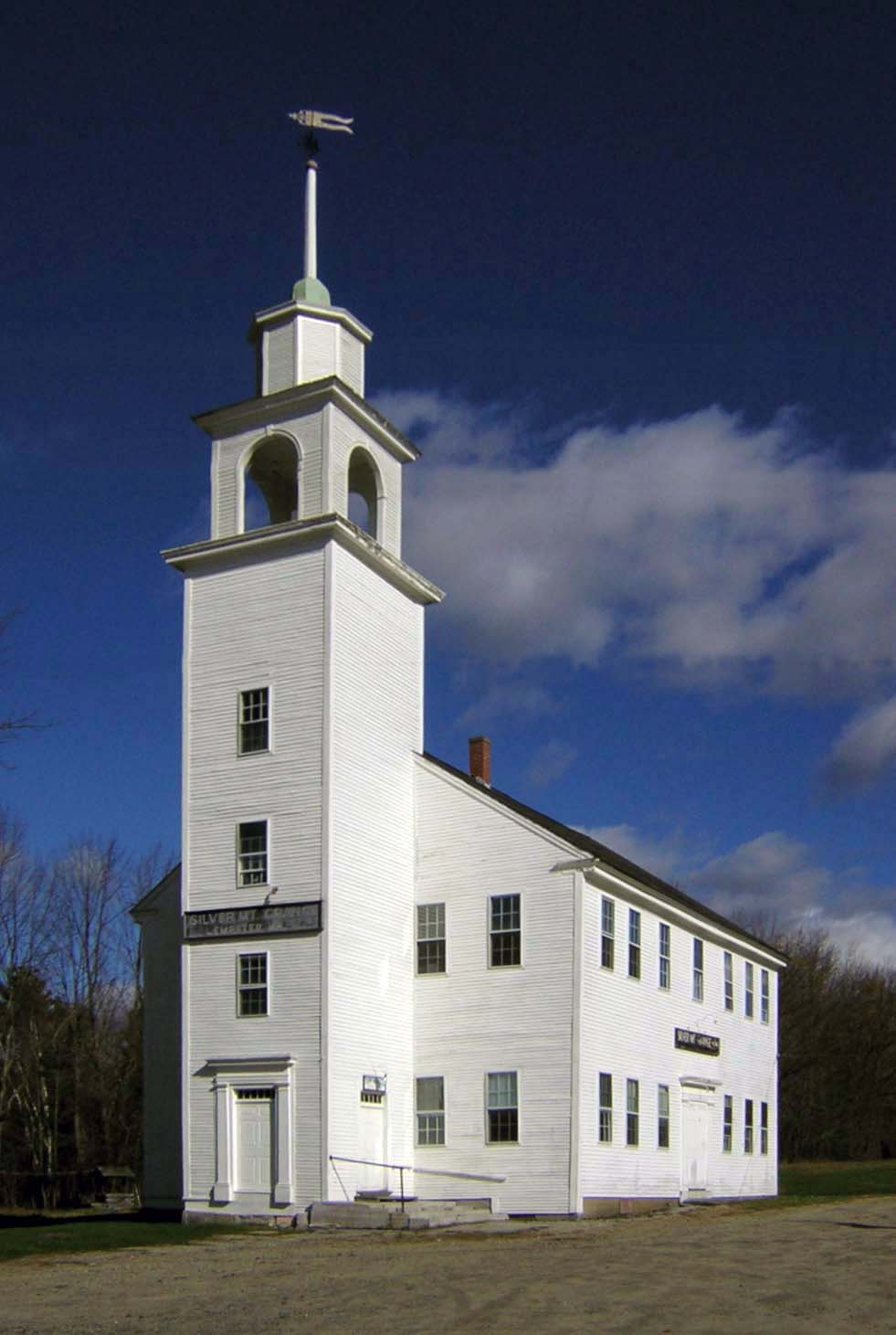

- Location within New Hampshire Location within the United States
- Location: Lempster St., Lempster, New Hampshire
- Coordinates: 43°14′20″N 72°12′38″W
- Area: 1 acre (0.40 ha)
- Built: 1794
- Architect: Bingham, James; Frink, Elijah
- Architectural style: Rural Twin Porch
- NRHP reference No.: 80000319
- Added to NRHP: September 08, 1980

The Lempster Meetinghouse, formerly Union Hall, is a historic meeting house and church on Lempster Street in Lempster, New Hampshire. Built in 1794 to serve multiple Christian congregations, it is now a multifunction space owned by the town. The building was listed on the National Register of Historic Places in 1980.

== Description and history ==
The former Lempster Meetinghouse stands in the town's village center, on the east side of Lempster Street near its junction with Allen Road and North Pitkin Road. It is a two-story wood-frame structure, with a gabled roof and clapboarded exterior. Its main facade is fronted by a projecting square tower, which rises through multiple stages to an open belfry with arched openings, and an octagonal cupola. The right side houses what was originally its main entrance, set centrally on the seven-bay facade.

The meetinghouse was built in 1794, and is one of a modest number of New England meeting houses to survive from the 18th century, and one of a very small number with twin porches. It was built at town expense, serving as both a town hall and church until 1822. At that time it was divested of its religious functions and moved about 1 mile (1.6 km) to its present location. The upper gallery level was extended to create a second floor, and the box pews and pulpit were removed. A bell tower was added (with a Revere bell hung in 1824). It has since then served a variety of community functions, include Grange activities, the local library, a high school academy, and a local theatrical company.

== See also ==
- National Register of Historic Places listings in Sullivan County, New Hampshire
