= Acworth Silsby Library =

- U.S. National Register of Historic Places
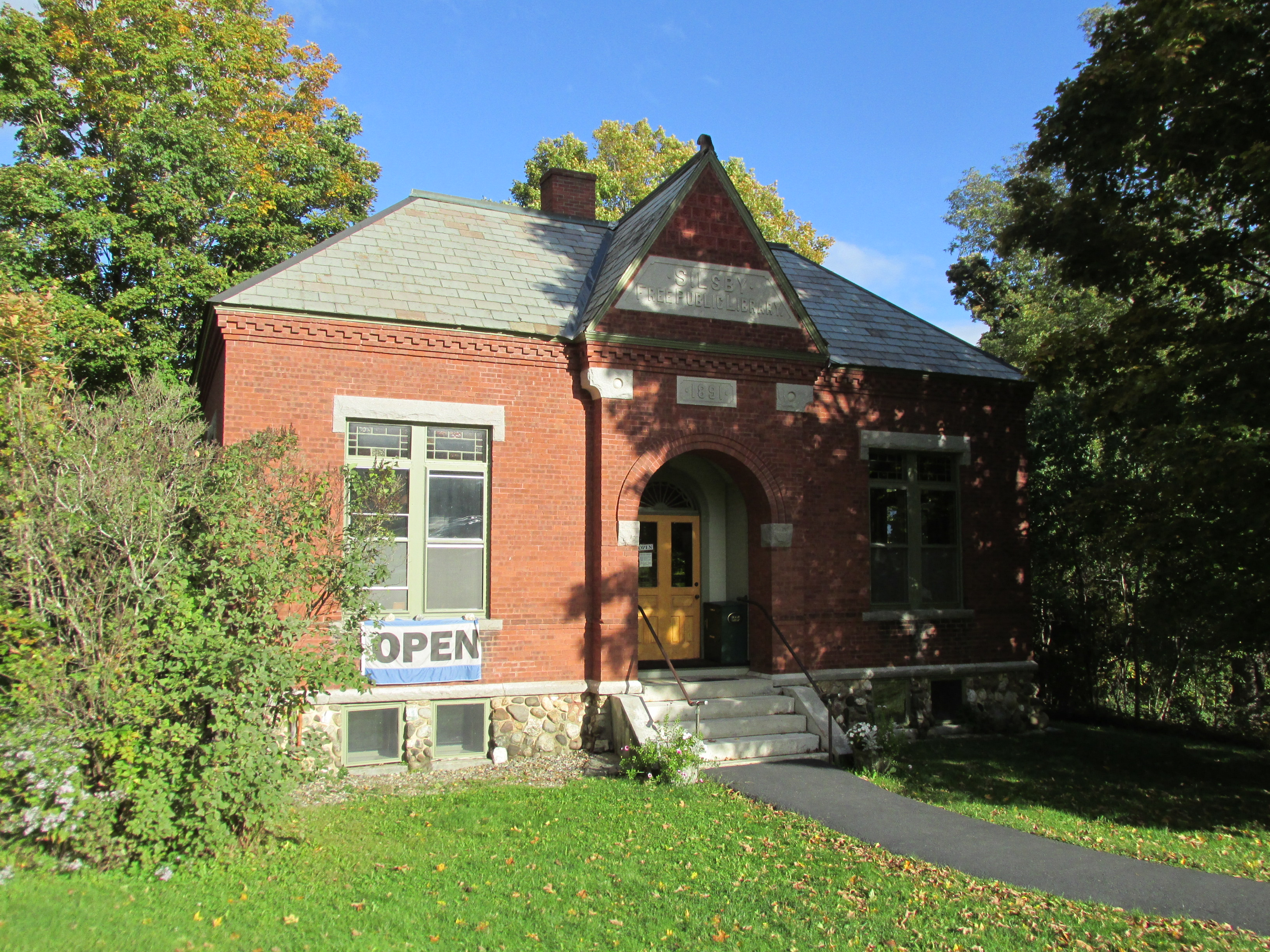

- Location within New Hampshire Location within the United States
- Location: 5 Lynn Hill Rd., Acworth, New Hampshire
- Coordinates: 43°13′6″N 72°17′33″W
- Area: 1 acre (0.40 ha)
- Built: 1891
- Architect: Hira R. Beckwith
- Architectural style: Romanesque
- NRHP reference No.: 83004206
- Added to NRHP: December 8, 1983

The Acworth Silsby Library is the public library of Acworth, New Hampshire, located in the town center at 5 Lynn Hill Road. Built in 1891 and funded by Acworth native Ithiel Homer Silsby, the building is a distinctive local example of Romanesque architecture. The building was listed on the National Register of Historic Places in 1983.

== Architecture and history ==
The library is located adjacent to the town common, northeast of the junction of Cold Pond and Lynn Hill roads. It is a 1 1/2-story masonry structure, its brick walls trimmed in stone and set on a fieldstone foundation. It is covered by a hipped slate roof, with a brick chimney rising behind the main ridge. The main facade is symmetrical, with paired sash windows flanking a projecting center entrance bay. The sash windows are topped by Craftsman-style transom windows. The entrance is topped by a gable, and the door is set recessed behind a rounded archway. The interior has a central foyer flanked by similarly appointed reading rooms, with a rectangular extension to the rear housing the library stacks.

The Romanesque structure was designed and built in 1891 by Hira R. Beckwith of Claremont. Beckwith is better known for Claremont City Hall and other buildings in downtown Claremont. Construction of the building was funded by a bequest from Acworth native Ithiel Homer Silsby, who had made his fortune as a Boston hotelier. Silsby also funded construction of the library in nearby Charlestown, New Hampshire, where he once worked as a teacher.

== See also ==
- National Register of Historic Places listings in Sullivan County, New Hampshire
