= William Rossiter House =

Historic house in New Hampshire, United States

- U.S. National Register of Historic Places
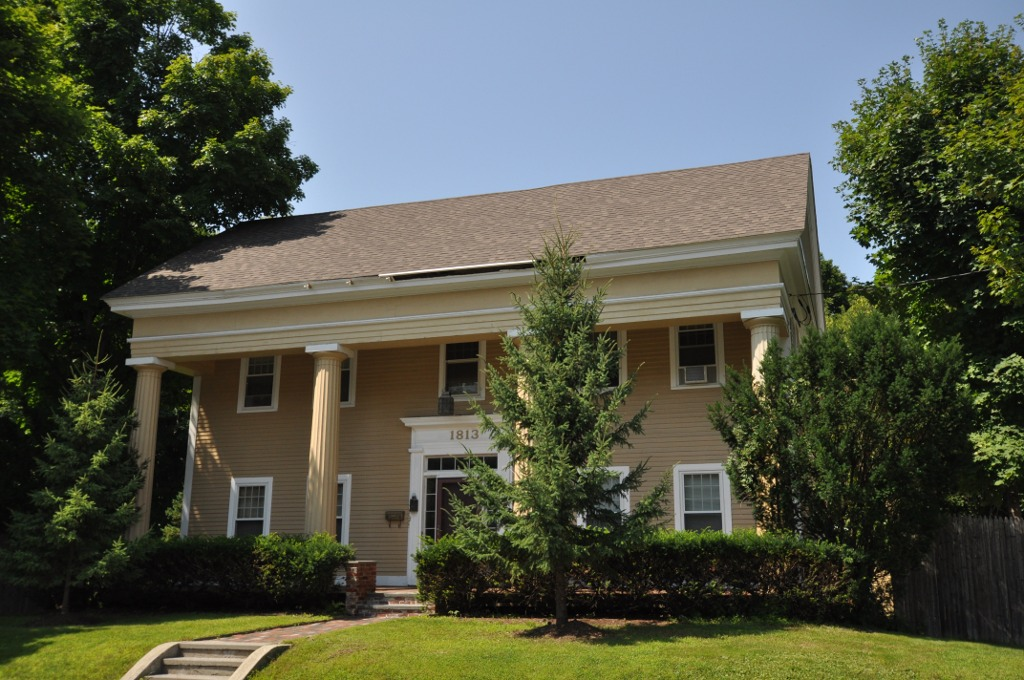

- Location within New Hampshire Location within the United States
- Location: 11 Mulberry St., Claremont, New Hampshire
- Coordinates: 43°22′20″N 72°20′41″W
- Area: less than one acre
- Built: 1813
- Architectural style: Greek Revival, Federal
- NRHP reference No.: 79000215
- Added to NRHP: May 25, 1979

The William Rossiter House is a historic house at 11 Mulberry Street in Claremont, New Hampshire. Built in 1813 and enlarged by about 1850, it is a distinctive local example of Greek Revival architecture, with many surviving Federal period features. The house was listed on the National Register of Historic Places in 1979.

== Description and history ==
The William Rossiter House stands in a residential area west of downtown Clarement, on the west side of Mulberry Street roughly midway between Myrtle and Sullivan Streets. It is a 2 1/2-story timber-frame structure, with a gabled roof and clapboarded exterior. The house's five-bay facade is fronted by a massive two-story Greek Revival temple portico, with fluted Ionic columns rising to a full entablature. Its main entrance is framed by sidelight and transom windows, and has flanking pilasters and a projecting cornice above. The interior retains a number of original Federal period finishes, including doors with original hardware, and several delicately carved fireplace surrounds. A two-story ell extends to the rear; it has less ornate original finishes, which include crown moulding and four-panel doors. The ell is further extended by a 20th-century garage.

The main block of this multi-section house was built in 1813 by Austin Tyler. The ell was added, and the house given its extensive Greek Revival treatment, c. 1830-50 by William Rossiter, a prominent local businessman and politician. Rossiter was an executive in the city's Sullivan Woolen Mills, served four terms as city selectman, and was twice elected to the state legislature.

== See also ==
- National Register of Historic Places listings in Sullivan County, New Hampshire
