= Stelljes House =

Historic house in New Hampshire, United States

- U.S. National Register of Historic Places
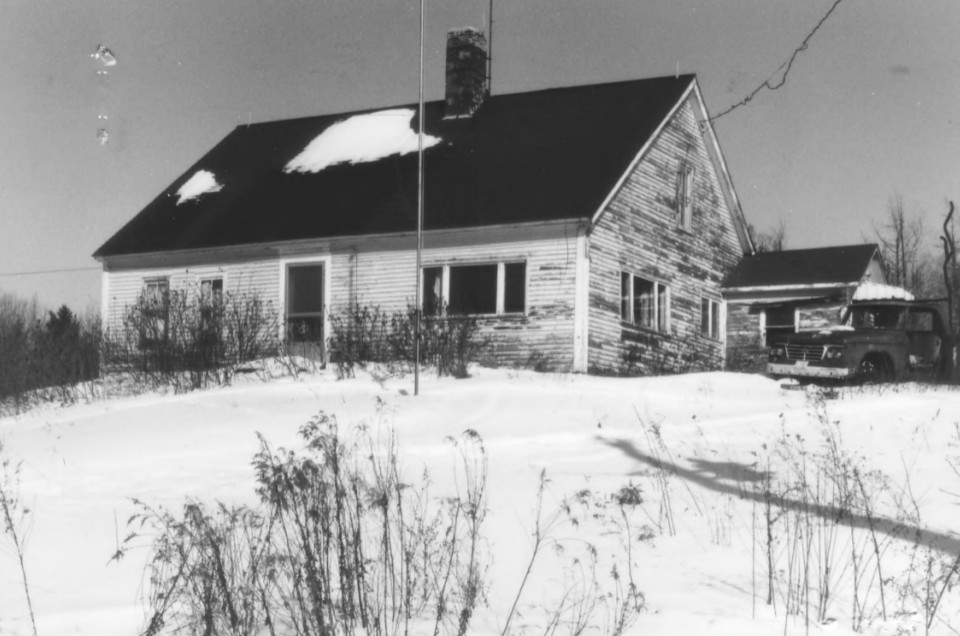
- 1983 photo

- Location within New Hampshire Location within the United States
- Location: NH 31, Goshen, New Hampshire
- Coordinates: 43.271571°N 72.123014°W
- Area: 107 acres (43 ha)
- Built: 1800
- Architect: Booth, Royal
- Architectural style: Cape
- MPS: Plank Houses of Goshen New Hampshire TR
- NRHP reference No.: 85001322
- Added to NRHP: June 21, 1985

The Stelljes House is a historic house on New Hampshire Route 31 in Goshen, New Hampshire. Built about 1800, it is one of the oldest of a cluster of plank-frame houses in Goshen. The house was listed on the National Register of Historic Places in 1985. It has possibly been demolished.

== Description and history ==
The Stelljes House stands in a rural area of southern Goshen, on the east side of NH 31. It is a 1 1/2-story wooden structure, with a gabled roof and clapboarded exterior. A brick chimney rises slightly off-center from the roof ridge. The main facade is asymmetrical, with a slightly off-center entrance, two sash windows to its left, and a three-section modern picture window to the right. A gable dormer projects from the rear roof face. An ell extends from the southern portion of the rear of the main block, with a porch in the corner joining the two blocks.

The house was built about 1800, and is one of the oldest of Goshen's cluster of plank-frame houses. The framing is three-inch planking attached vertically to sills, which rests on a rubble and granite stone foundation. Dowels are attached horizontally to give this framing lateral stability. The front facade was probably originally five bays across.

== See also ==
- National Register of Historic Places listings in Sullivan County, New Hampshire
