= Williamson House (Goshen, New Hampshire) =

Historic house in New Hampshire, United States

- U.S. National Register of Historic Places
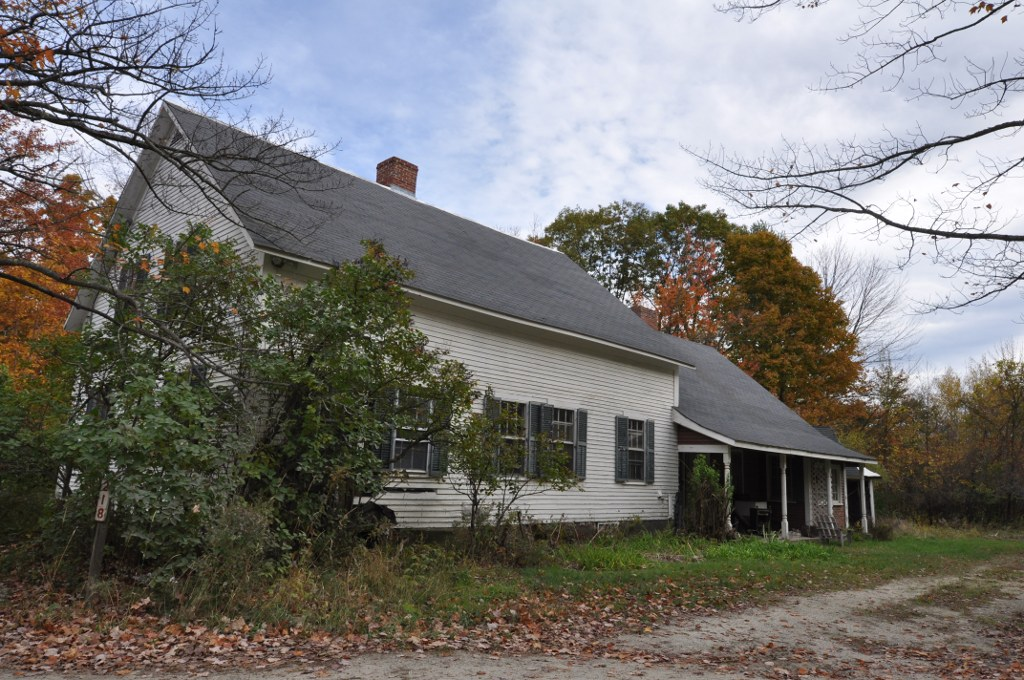

- Location within New Hampshire Location within the United States
- Location: Messer Rd., Goshen, New Hampshire
- Coordinates: 43.33378°N 72.11315°W
- Area: 30 acres (12 ha)
- Built: 1850
- Architectural style: Kneewall
- MPS: Plank Houses of Goshen New Hampshire TR
- NRHP reference No.: 85001324
- Added to NRHP: June 21, 1985

The Williamson House is a historic house on Messer Road in Goshen, New Hampshire. Built about 1850, it is one of a cluster of plank-frame houses in the town, and is unusual in that group for its framing style. The house was listed on the National Register of Historic Places in 1985.

== Description and history ==
The Williamson House is located in a rural setting in northern Goshen, on the north side of a bend in Messer Road, about 0.4 miles (0.64 km) east of Nutting Road. It is a 1½-story wooden house, with a gabled roof and clapboarded exterior. It is distinct in Goshen's cluster of plank-frame houses in its use of two-inch planking instead of the more typical three inches. The walls are further likely to be load-bearing, as the house lacks corner posts, and are pinned to the frame rather than the more typical mortise-and-tenon method seen in other such houses. The main block is five bays wide and four deep, with an attached ell that is four bays by three. The main facade has five irregularly spaced sash windows, with the main entrance located in the front of the ell, which is sheltered by a shed-roof porch.

The house was built about 1850, probably for Isaac Messer, who is known to have lived here by 1860. The property remained in the Messer family until the 1940s. Outbuildings on the property include a small sugar house (behind the main house), and a barn (across the road).

== See also ==
- National Register of Historic Places listings in Sullivan County, New Hampshire
