= Blow-Me-Down Grange =

- U.S. National Register of Historic Places
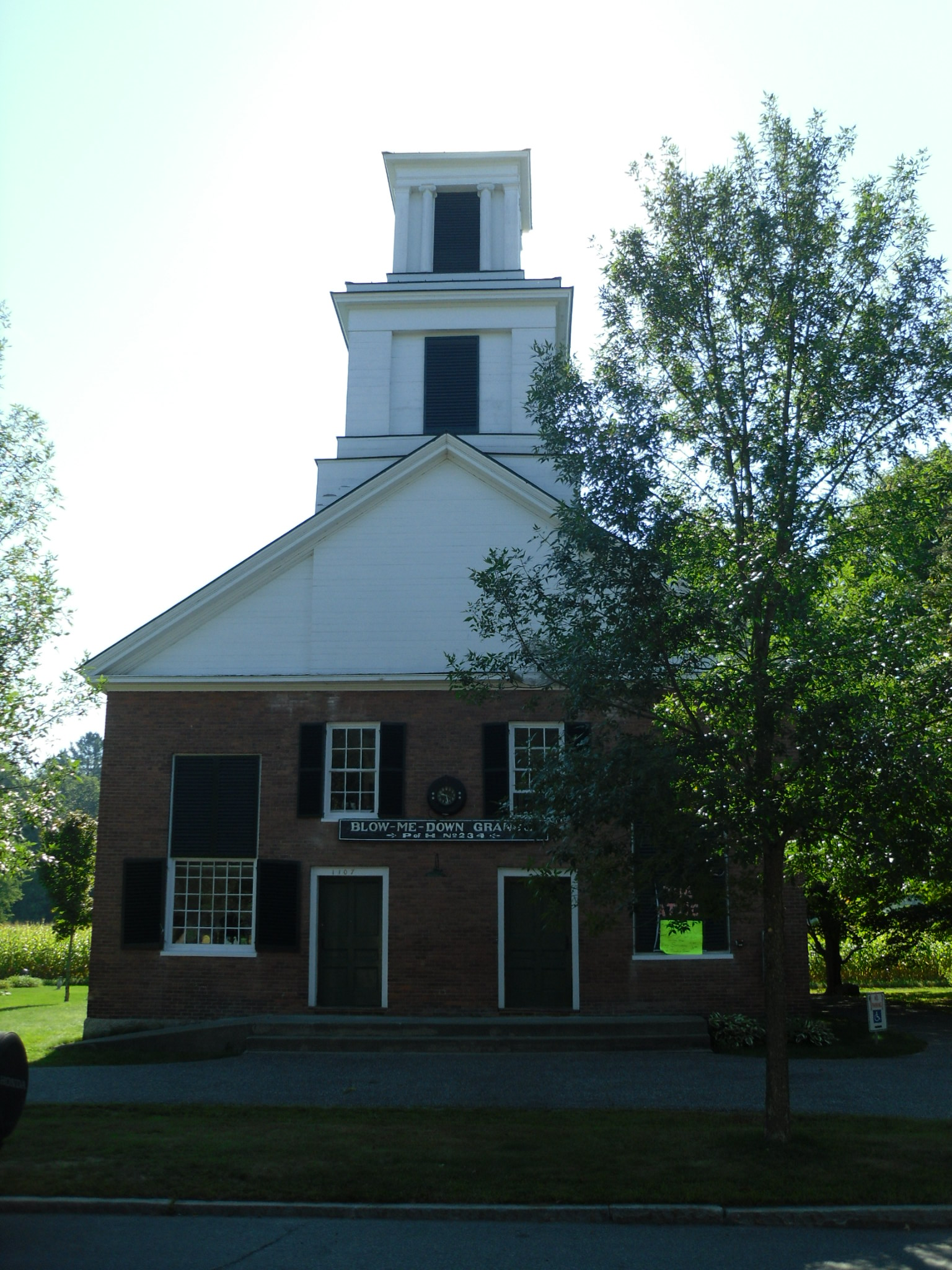

- Location within New Hampshire Location within the United States
- Location: 1071 NH 12-A, Plainfield, New Hampshire
- Coordinates: 43°32′1″N 72°21′24″W
- Area: 0.4 acres (0.16 ha)
- Built: 1839
- Architect: Egglestone, Charles
- Architectural style: Greek Revival
- NRHP reference No.: 01000205
- Added to NRHP: March 2, 2001

The Blow-Me-Down Grange is a historic Grange hall at 1071 New Hampshire Route 12A in Plainfield, New Hampshire, United States. It is home to the Patrons of Husbandry Chapter 234. Built in 1839 as a church, it is architecturally significant for its Greek Revival features, and socially significant for the ongoing role of the Grange chapter in the local community. It was listed on the National Register of Historic Places in 2001.

== Description and history ==
The Blow-Me-Down Grange is located in the village center of Plainfield, on the east side of New Hampshire Route 12A south of its junction with Paterson Road. It is a 1 1/2-story brick building with a gabled roof, and a two-stage tower which rises from the peak of the roof at its front (west side). The main facade is symmetrical, with a pair of entrances flanked by large sash windows and topped by smaller ones. The stages of the tower are plainly finished except for slender Ionic columns flanking the louvers of the upper stage. The interior, originally a single story with balcony, was converted to two stories in 1939–40. Although the interior of the first floor is now used as a meeting space with kitchen, many of the original pews are still in the building, and signs of the presence of more are visible on the pine floors. The second-story hall's stage is decorated with a large oil painting, originally made by Lucia Fairchild Fuller for the Woman's Building of the World's Columbian Exposition in Chicago in 1893.

The building was constructed in 1838 by Charles Eggleston, a local builder, for use as a union church serving multiple Congregationalist groups. It was acquired in 1899 by the local Grange chapter, which was founded in 1894. The building was renovated in 2001. In 2012, there were monthly meetings held there.

== See also ==
- National Register of Historic Places listings in Sullivan County, New Hampshire
