= Seavey (name) =

Seavey is a name. It can be both a surname and a middle name. Notable people with this name include:

== As a surname ==
- Clyde Follet Seavey (1904 – 1991), an American painter
- Dallas Seavey (born 1987), an American dog racer
- Dan Seavey (1865 – 1949), an American pirate
- Dan Seavey (musher) (1938 – 2025), an American musher
- Daniel Seavey (born 1999), an American singer-songwriter
- Logan Seavey (born 1997), an American stock car racing driver
- Mitch Seavey (born 1959), an American dog racer
- Nina Gilden Seavey, an American documentary maker

== As a middle name ==
- Eli Seavey Ricker (1843 – 1926), an American corporal, newspaper editor, judge, and activist
- Martha Seavey Hoyt (1844 – 1915), an American writer
- W. Seavey Joyce (1913 – 1988), an American Catholic priest
