= Burford House (New Hampshire) =

Historic house in New Hampshire, United States

- U.S. National Register of Historic Places
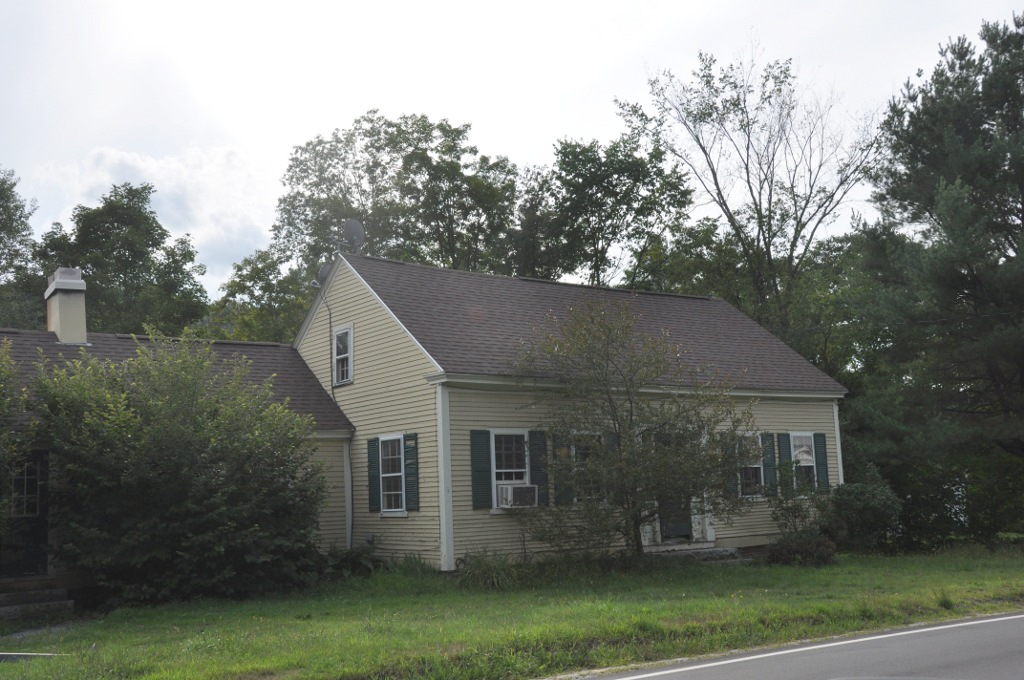

- Location within New Hampshire Location within the United States
- Location: NH 10, Goshen, New Hampshire
- Coordinates: 43°17′59″N 72°8′55″W
- Area: 0.3 acres (0.12 ha)
- Built: 1843
- Architectural style: Greek Revival
- MPS: Plank Houses of Goshen New Hampshire TR
- NRHP reference No.: 85001309
- Added to NRHP: June 21, 1985

The Burford House is a historic house on New Hampshire Route 10 in Goshen, New Hampshire. Built in 1843, it is one of a cluster of locally significant 19th-century plank-frame houses, and was for many years home to Walter Nelson, the local historian who researched these homes. The house was listed on the National Register of Historic Places in 1985.

== Description and history ==
The Burford House is located on the west side of New Hampshire Route 10, about 100 yards (91 m) south of its junction with Brook Road. It is a 1 1/2-story wooden structure, with a clapboarded exterior and gabled roof. Instead of more typical stud-framing construction, its walls are formed with three-inch planks as framing members, joined for lateral stability by wooden dowels. It is five bays wide and three deep, with a central chimney. It has a particularly elaborate Greek Revival front entry surround, with sidelight windows and fluted moulding. The main block is joined to a 19th-century barn by a series of smaller ells.

The house was built in 1843, and is one of a cluster of locally significant plank-frame houses. This house belonged to Walter Nelson, who was the first to identify and document Goshen's numerous plank-framed houses. He lived in this house for 65 years until his death in 1970, and became interested in the subject after researching this house's construction and history.

== See also ==
- National Register of Historic Places listings in Sullivan County, New Hampshire
