= Garver-Rentschler Barn =

- U.S. National Register of Historic Places
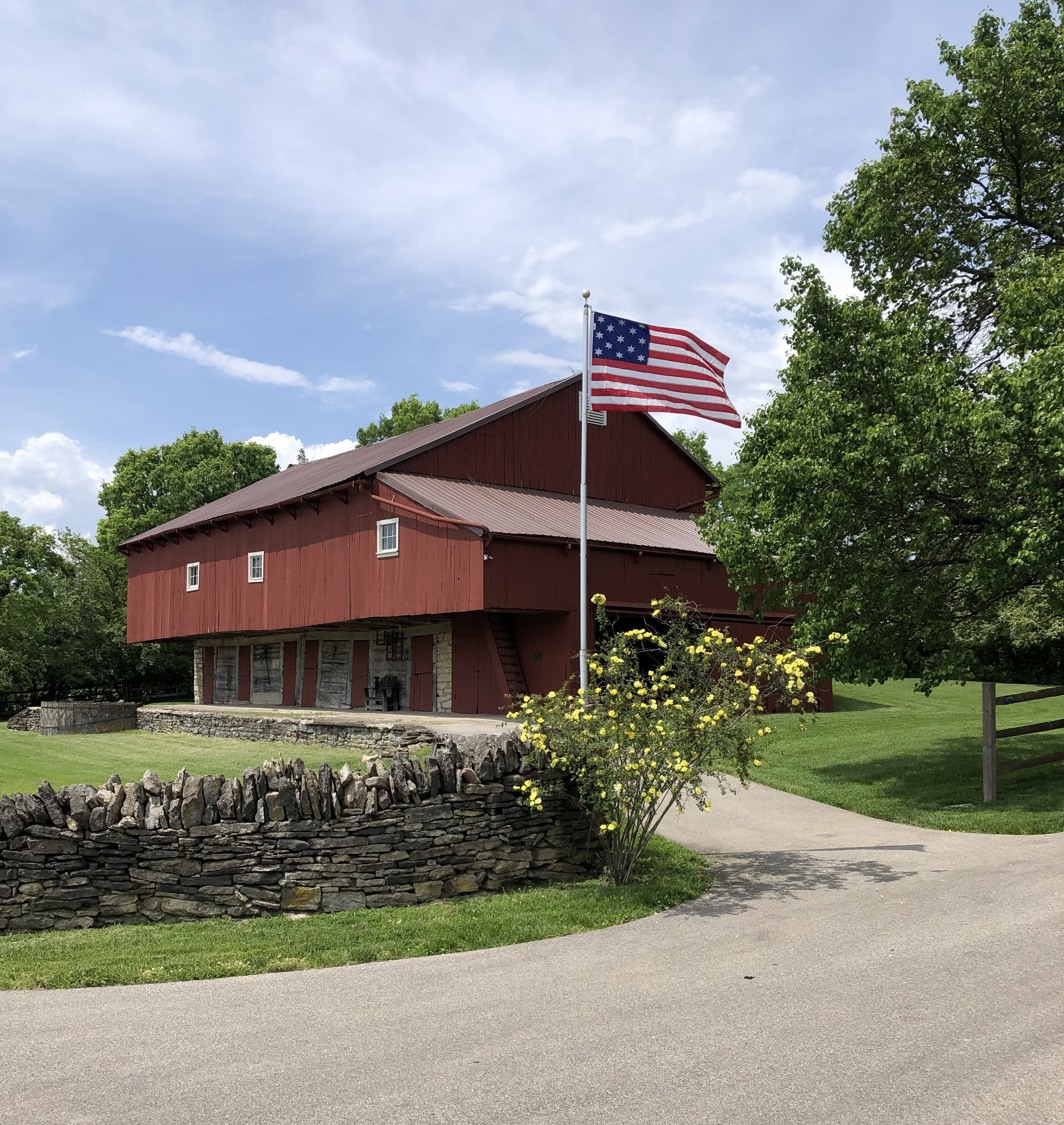
- Location: Hamilton, Ohio
- Architect: Joseph Garver
- NRHP reference No.: 80002947
- Added to NRHP: 11 August 1980

The Garver-Rentschler Barn is a registered historic building in Hamilton, Ohio, United States. It was listed on the National Register on August 11, 1980 under the name of "Garver Barn"; the official designation was changed to the present name in 2014.

== Historic uses ==
- Agricultural Outbuildings
