= Seavey House (Goshen, New Hampshire) =

Historic house in New Hampshire, United States

- U.S. National Register of Historic Places
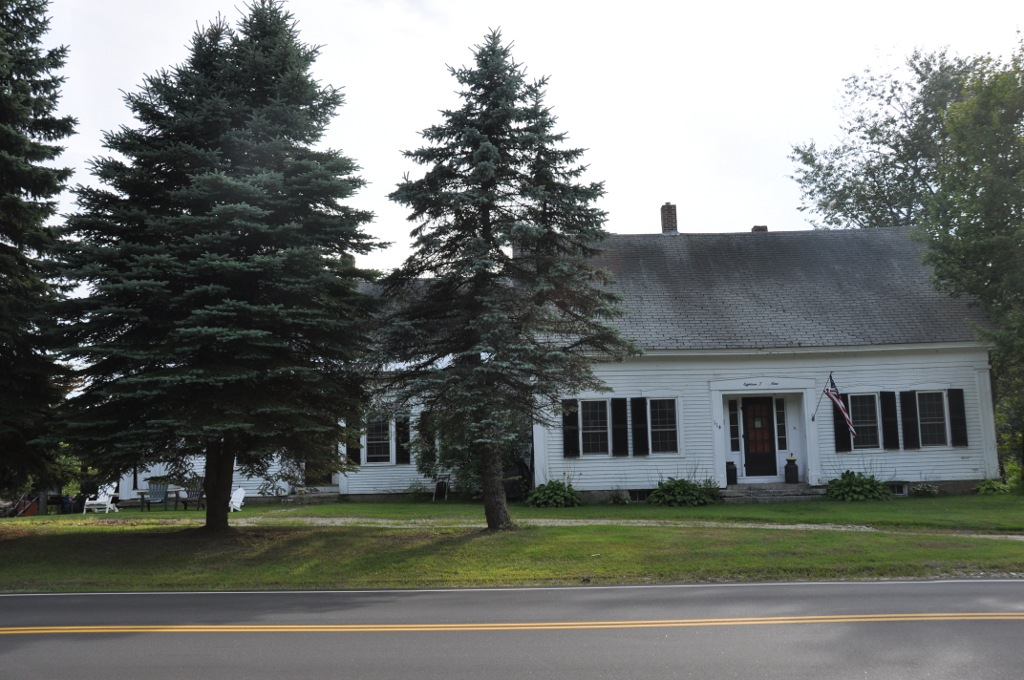

- Location within New Hampshire Location within the United States
- Location: NH 10, Goshen, New Hampshire
- Coordinates: 43°17′53″N 72°8′50″W
- Area: 5.4 acres (2.2 ha)
- Built: 1860
- Built by: Chandler, John
- Architectural style: Greek Revival
- MPS: Plank Houses of Goshen New Hampshire TR
- NRHP reference No.: 85001321
- Added to NRHP: June 21, 1985

The Seavey House is a historic plank-frame house in Goshen, New Hampshire. It is located on the west side of New Hampshire Route 10, just south of its junction with Brook Road. It was built about 1860 by John Chandler, a prolific local builder of plank-frame houses. The house was listed on the National Register of Historic Places in 1985.

== Description and history ==
The Seavey House is located south of the village center of Goshen, on the west side of NH 10. It is a 1 1/2-story wooden Cape-style house, with a gabled roof and clapboarded exterior. Its structure is framed out of wooden planking 3 inches (7.6 cm) thick, set vertically, with dowels placed horizontally for lateral stability. The main facade is five bays wide, with sash windows arranged symmetrically around an elaborate Greek Revival entrance. The entry is recessed, with sidelight windows immediately flanking the door, and pilasters with peaked lintels outside the recess. The building corners also have pilasters, which rise to an entablature which spans the front. A smaller single-story ell extends to the left at a recess to the main block.

The house was built about 1860, most likely by John Chandler, a prolific local builder of plank-frame houses. Local historians believe Chandler built this house for his own use.

== See also ==
- National Register of Historic Places listings in Sullivan County, New Hampshire
