= Cornish Flat, New Hampshire =

Unincorporated community in New Hampshire, United States

- Unincorporated community
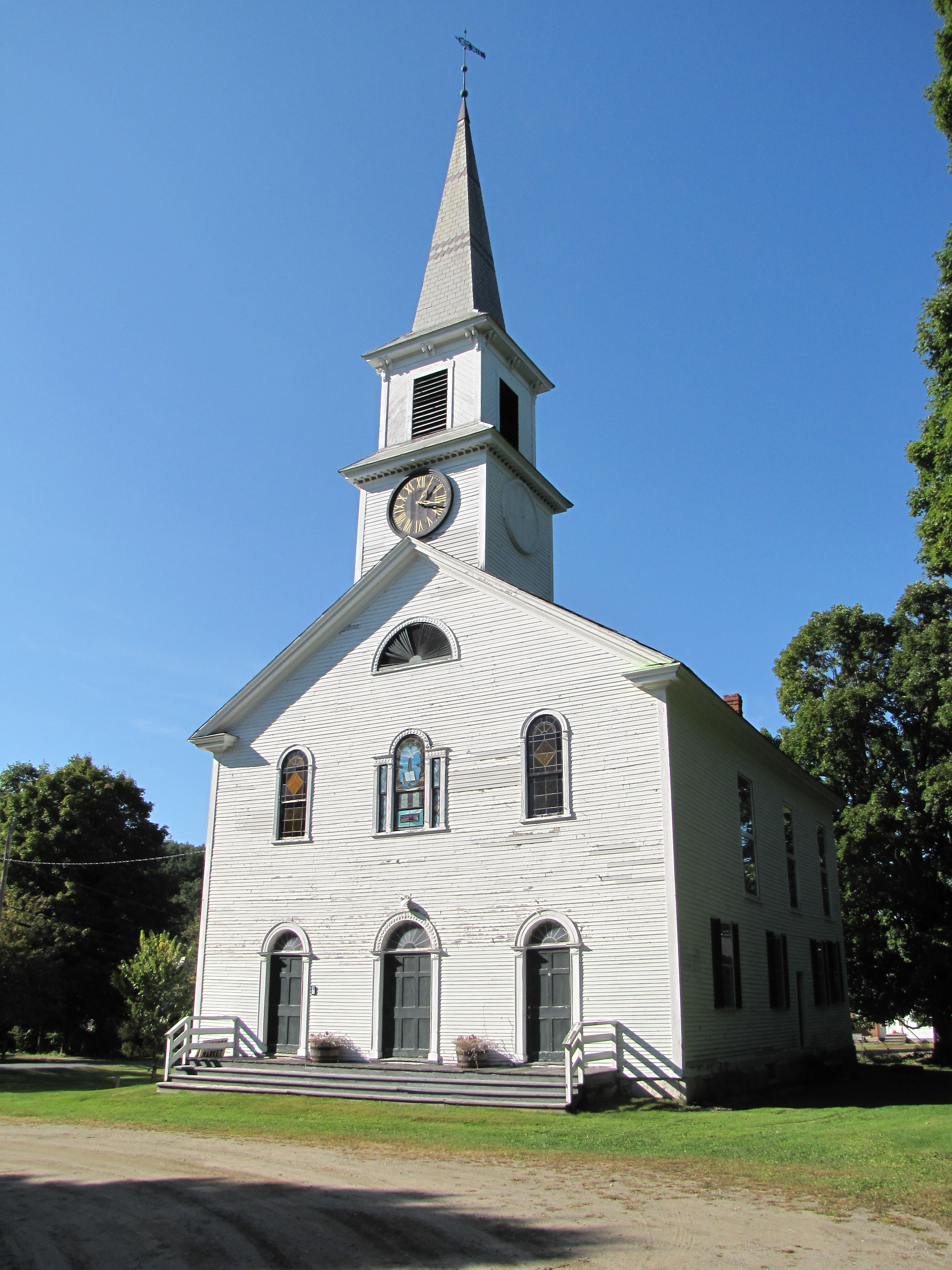
- First Baptist Church of Cornish

- Location within New Hampshire Location within the United States
- Coordinates: 43°29′50″N 72°16′46″W
- Country: United States
- State: New Hampshire
- County: Sullivan
- Town: Cornish
- Elevation: 837 ft (255 m)
- Time zone: UTC-5 (Eastern (EST))
  - Summer (DST): UTC-4 (EDT)
- ZIP code: 03746
- Area code: 603
- GNIS feature ID: 866351

Cornish Flat is an unincorporated community in the town of Cornish in Sullivan County, New Hampshire, United States.

The village is located in the northeastern corner of Cornish, at the southern end of a valley floor which is bordered westerly by Cornish Stage Road, easterly by New Hampshire Route 120, and whose northerly end is in the town of Plainfield. The headwaters of Blow-me-down Brook gather in a swampy lowland at the valley's north end formed by the confluence of Notch, Leavitt, Wine, and Penniman brooks entering the valley from the uplands of Corbin Park (a private game preserve) to the east and southeast, and by seasonal streams from the west side of the valley. Route 120 connects the village with Claremont to the south and Meriden and Lebanon to the north.

The village green has a life-size Union soldier statue elevated on a plinth carved in granite with the names of Cornish Civil War dead. Adjacent are a cast-iron memorial to World War I and granite steles commemorating World War II, the Korean War and Vietnam. A Memorial Day eulogy and parade begin here, led by the local Boy Scout troop. The old meeting house on the green has a spire and mostly reliable clock, whose bell tolls hourly. Recent upgrades to the meeting house windows do not meet National Park Service standards for historical preservation, but make the building more usable and energy efficient.

The local industry includes Dingee Machine, which outfits and repairs fire trucks and equipment, situated next to the #2 Cornish Fire Station on Route 120. Other businesses include the Cornish Flat post office, as well as the family-owned GMC dairy farm, an Angus beef farm neighboring it with substantial feed corn acreage.

The village has a separate ZIP code (03746) from the rest of the town of Cornish.
