= Kenyon Bridge =

- U.S. National Register of Historic Places
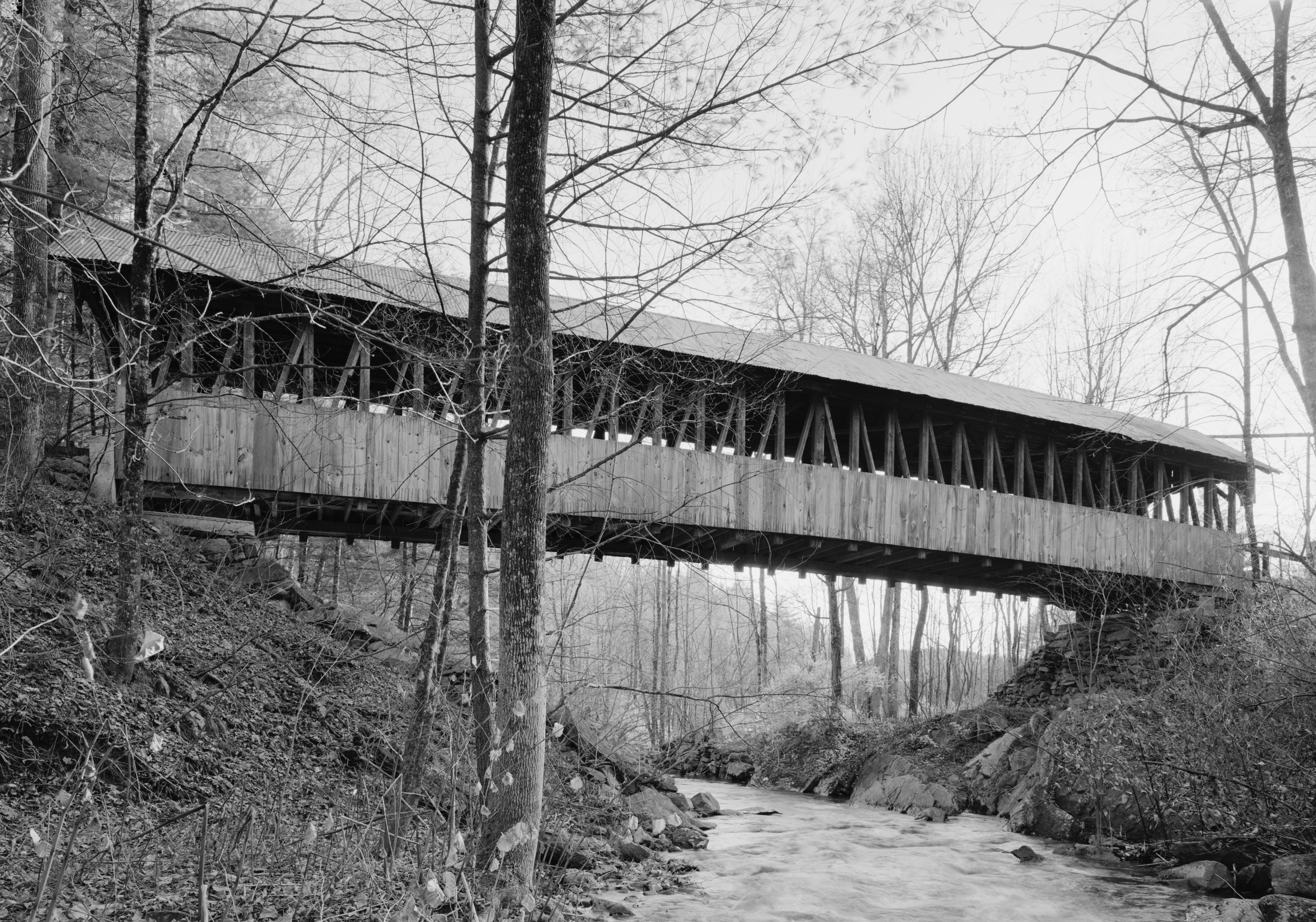

- Location within New Hampshire Location within the United States
- Location: Off NH 12A at Mill Brook and Town House Rd., Cornish City, New Hampshire
- Coordinates: 43°27′47″N 72°21′12″W
- Area: 0.5 acres (0.20 ha)
- Built: 1882
- Architect: Tasker, James
- Architectural style: Multiple Kingpost Truss
- NRHP reference No.: 78000223
- Added to NRHP: May 22, 1978

The Kenyon Bridge, also known as the Blacksmith Shop Bridge, is a historic covered bridge spanning Mill Brook near Town House Road in Cornish, New Hampshire, United States. Built in 1882, it is one of New Hampshire's few surviving 19th-century covered bridges. It was listed on the National Register of Historic Places in 1978.

== Description and history ==
The Kenyon Bridge is located in a wooded rural setting, a short way east of Town House Road about 0.3 miles (0.48 km) south of its junction with Center Road. It spans Mill Brook in a roughly east-west orientation. It is 96 feet (29 m) long and 14.5 feet (4.4 m) wide, with a roadbed 90 feet (27 m) long and 13 feet (4.0 m) wide. The bridge rests on dry-laid stone abutments. The bridge's multiple kingpost trusses are sheltered by a sheet metal roof, with vertical plank siding covering the lower 1/3 of the trusses. Each truss consists of 28 panel sections between 29 posts.

The bridge was built in 1882 by James Frederick Tasker (1826–1903), a local builder well known for his bridges. Its historic name, Blacksmith Shop Bridge, derives from a shop nearby owned by blacksmith John Fellows. It underwent a major rehabilitation in 1963. It is now closed to vehicular traffic, but open to pedestrians. On Town House Rd, at the approximate DD coordinates of 43.463, -72.3539, a sign for Covered Bridge No. 21 marks this bridge.

== Images ==
Structural design of the Kenyon Bridge

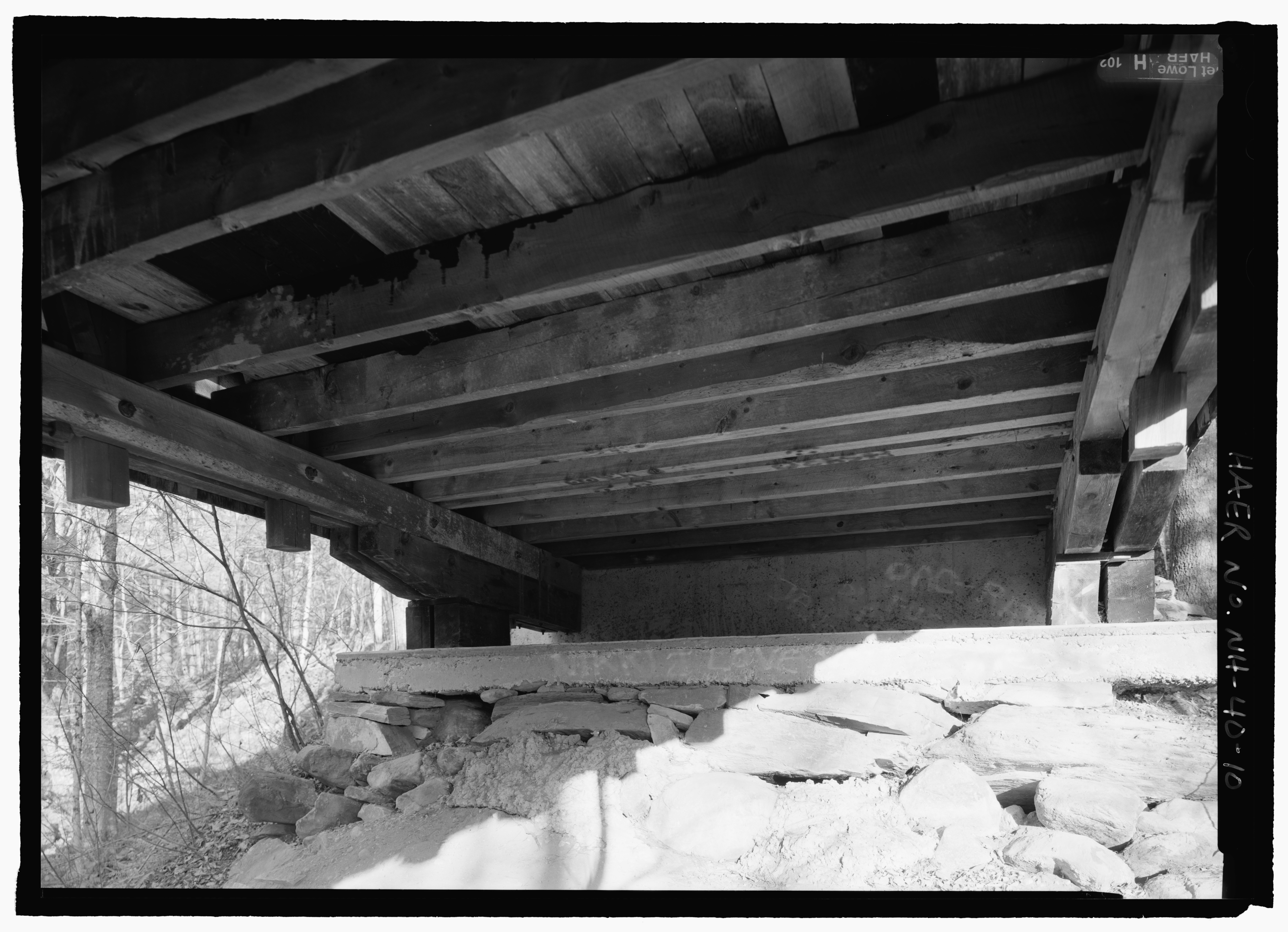
(image 1 of 14)
2003
Detail: eastern abutment, east-northeast 60° (HAER)

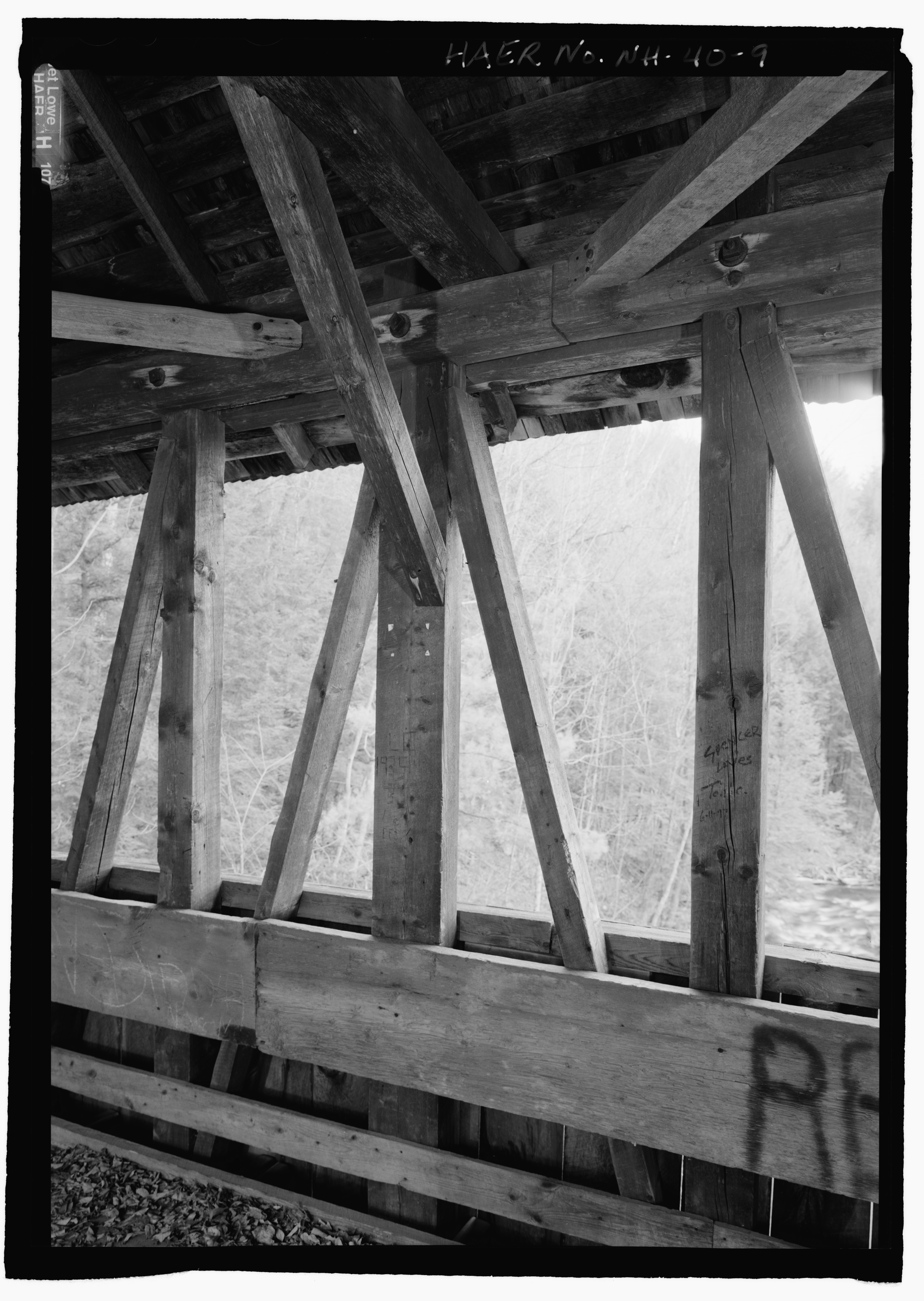
(image 2 of 14)
2003
Detail: midspan, south panel (HAER)

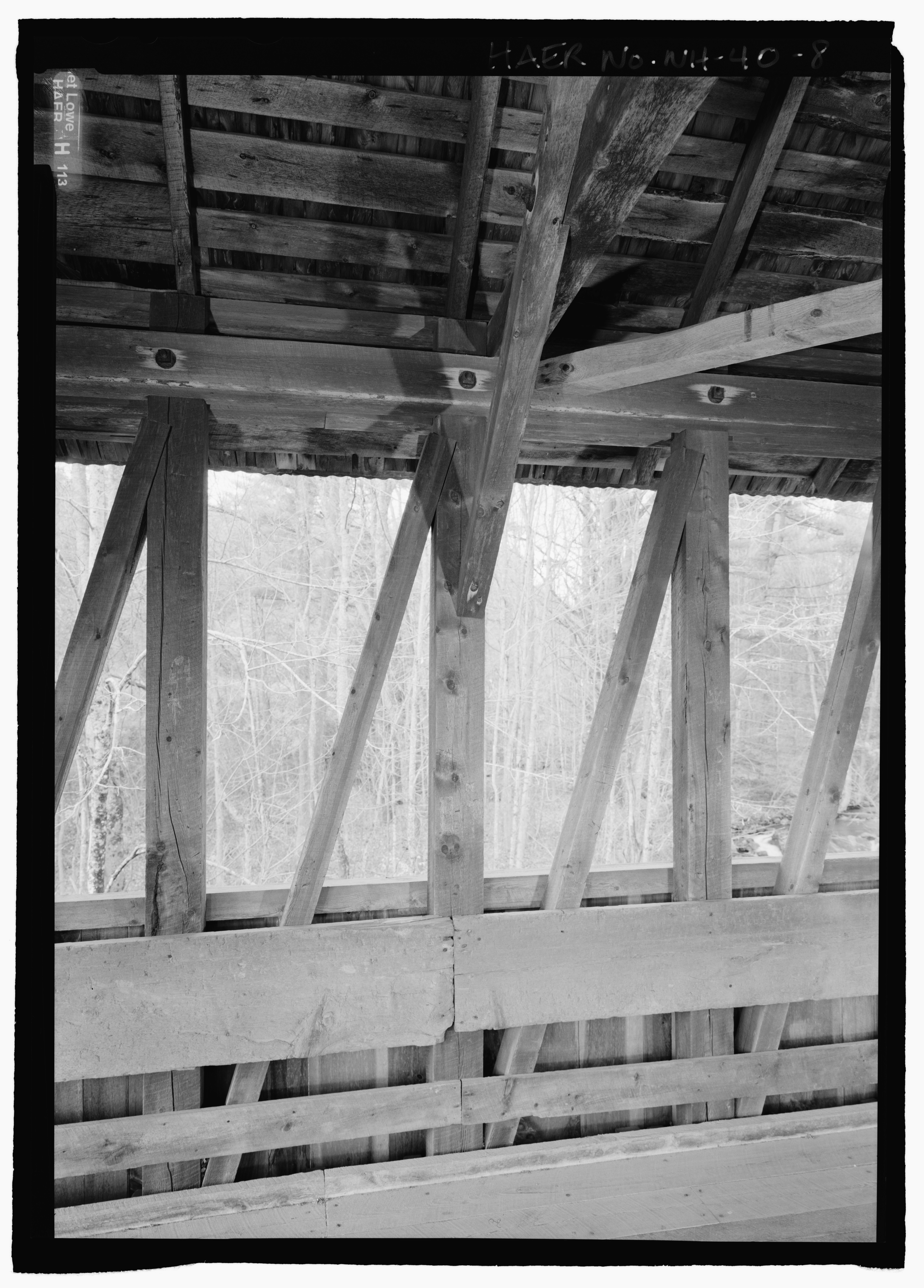
(image 3 of 14)
2003
Framing detail: north panel (HAER)

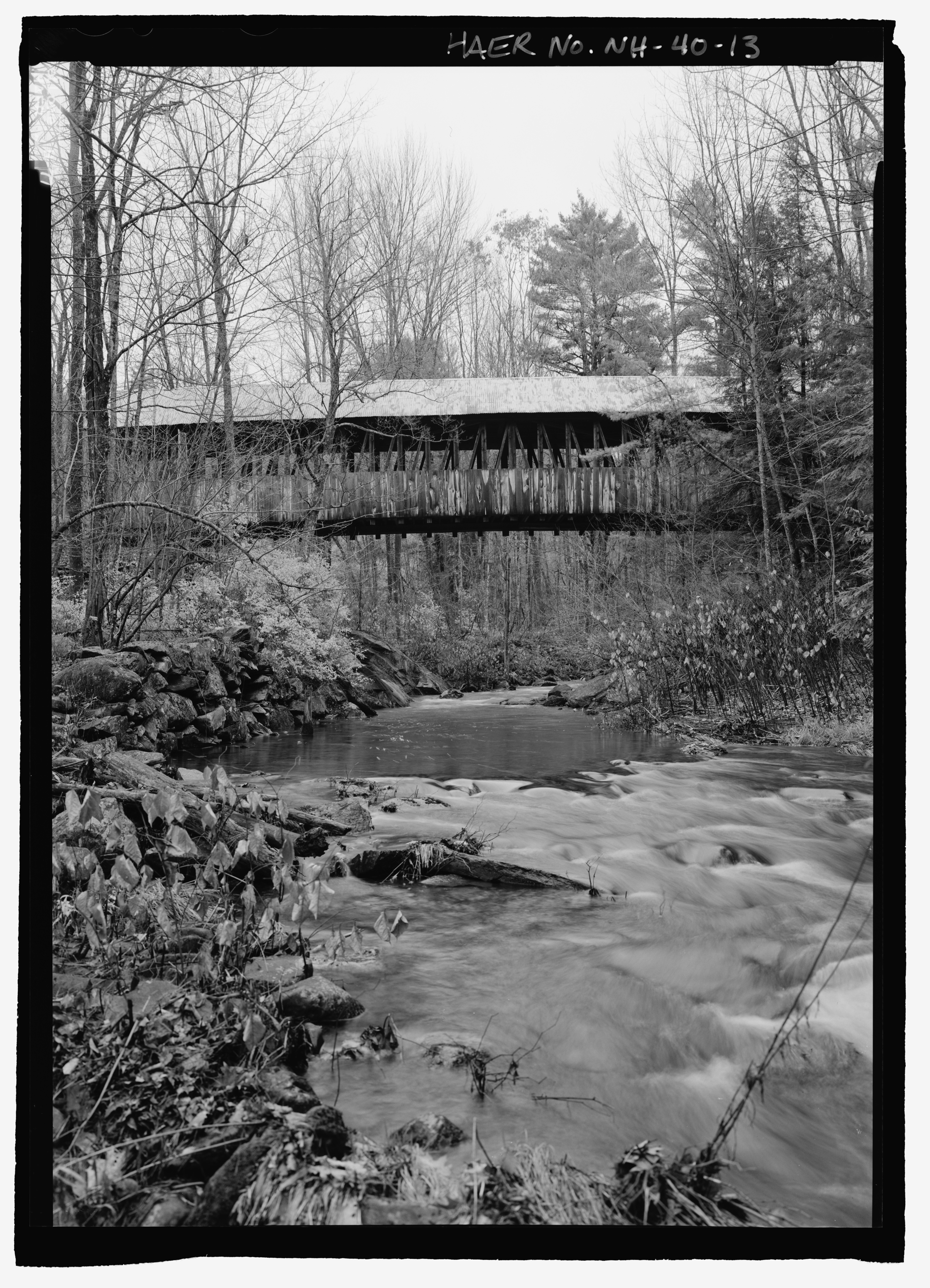
(image 4 of 14)
2003
Downstream elevation, looking north (HAER)

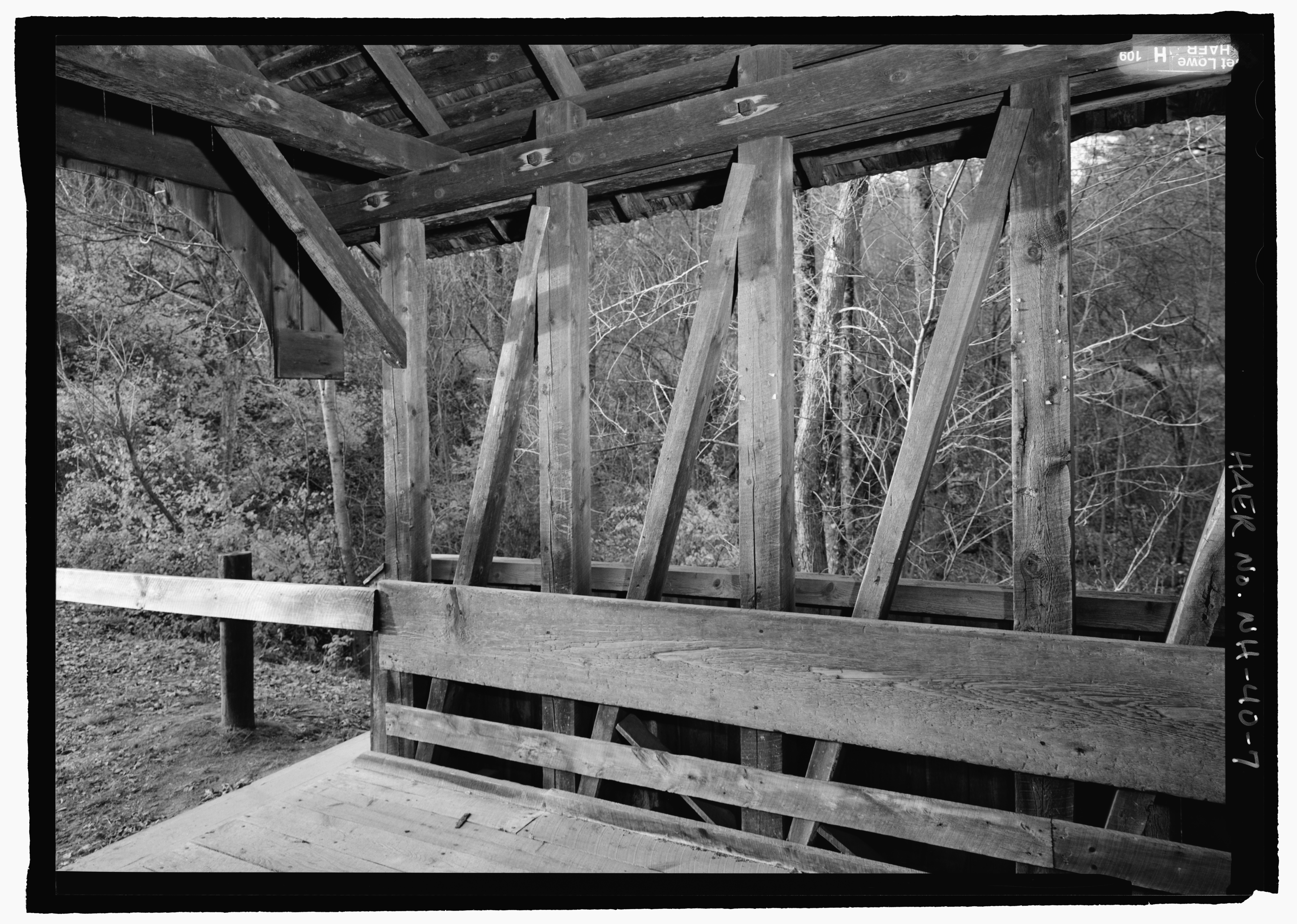
(image 5 of 14)
2003
End post detail: west end (HAER)

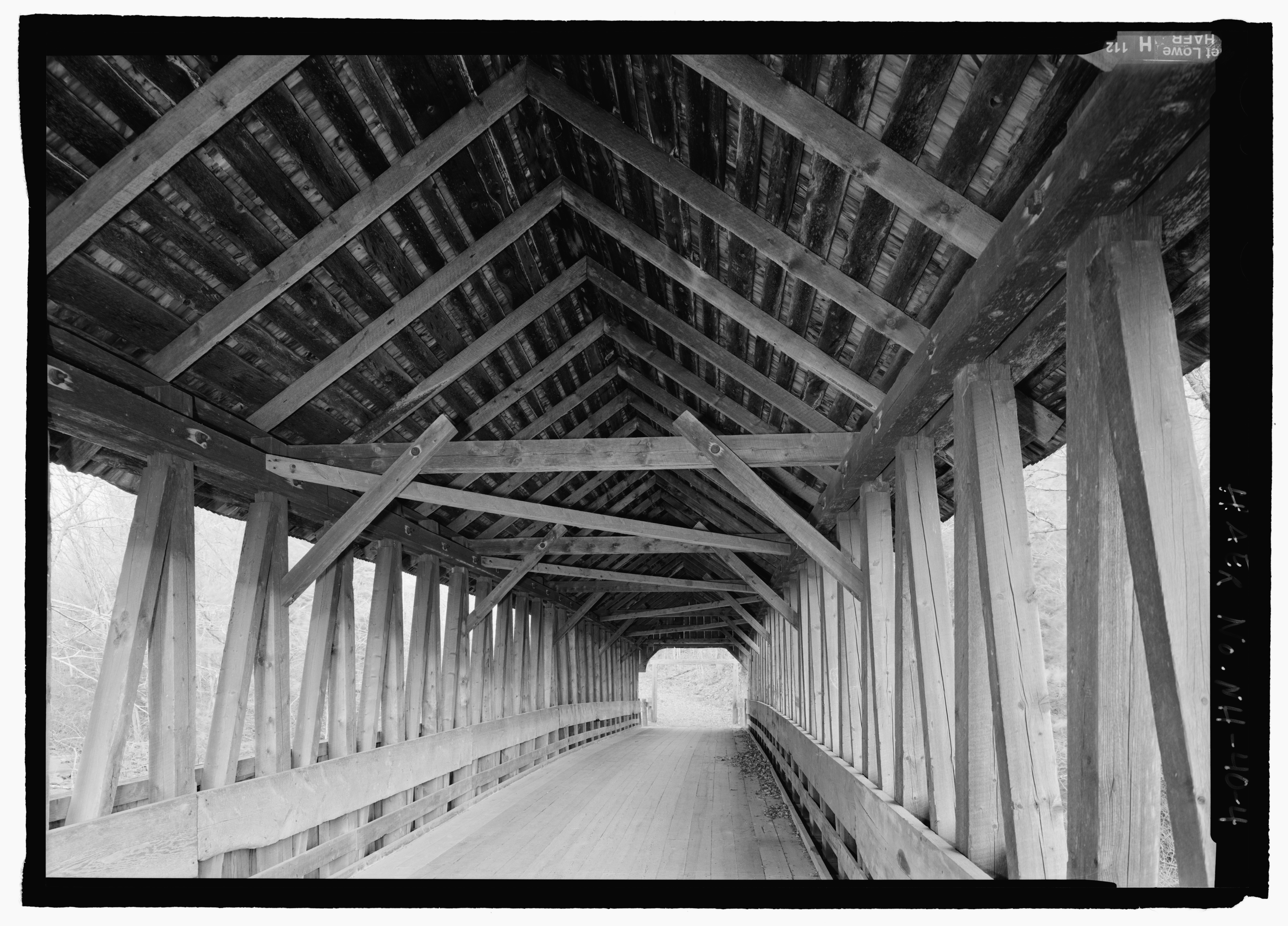
(image 6 of 14)
2003
Interior view from the west (HAER)

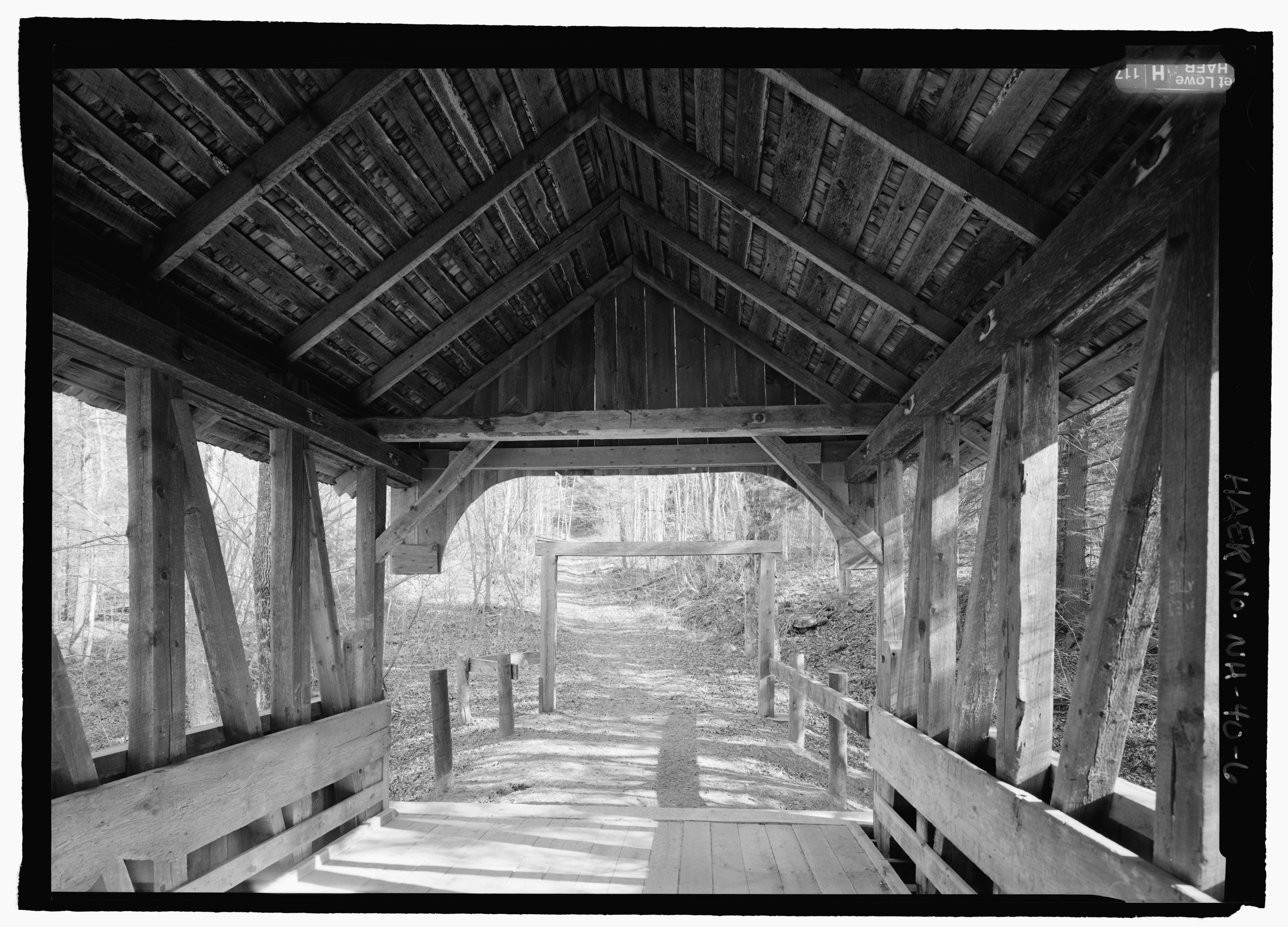
(image 7 of 14)
2003
Interior view, east portal, looking east (HAER)

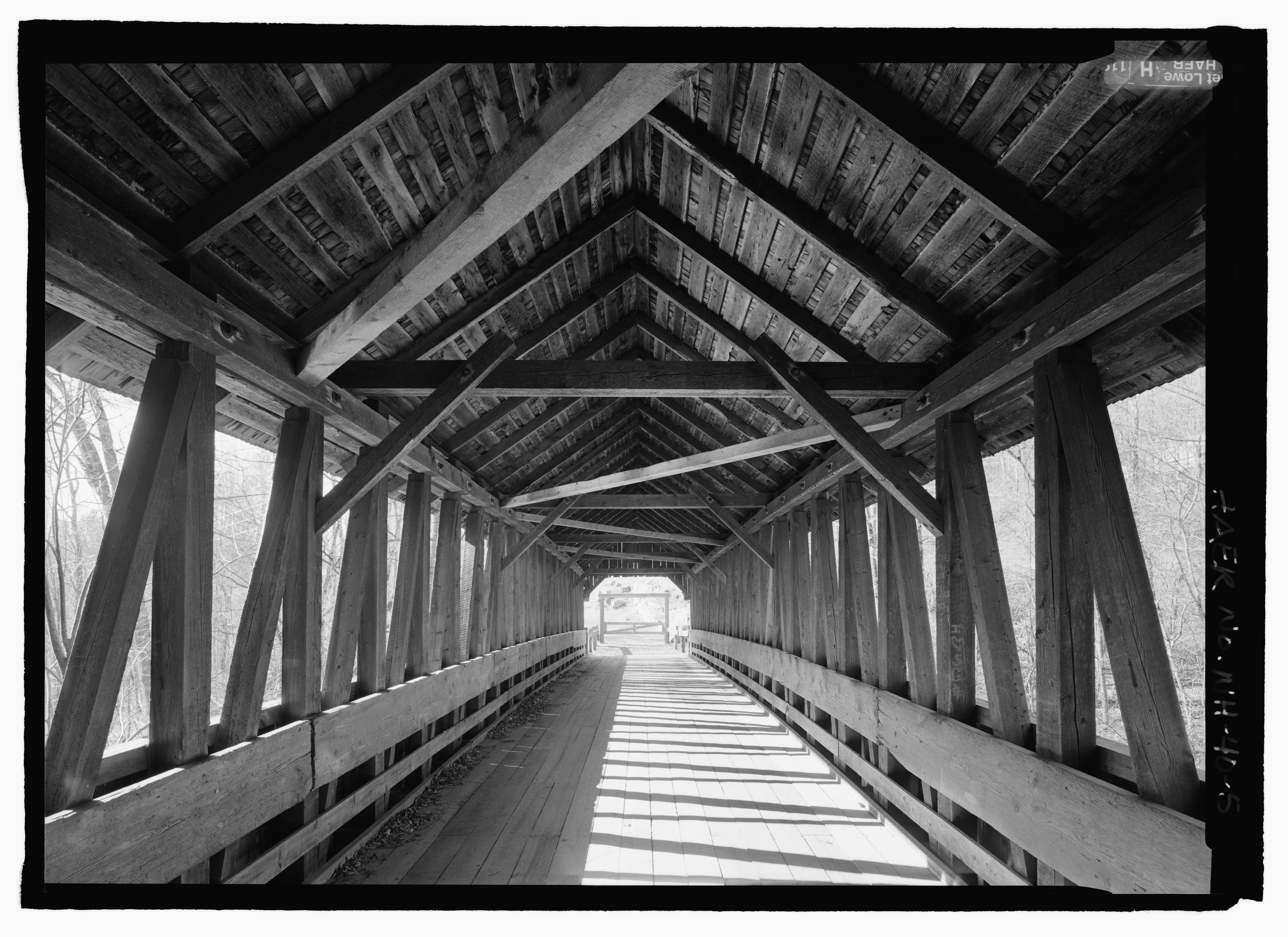
(image 8 of 14)
2003
Interior view, looking west (HAER)

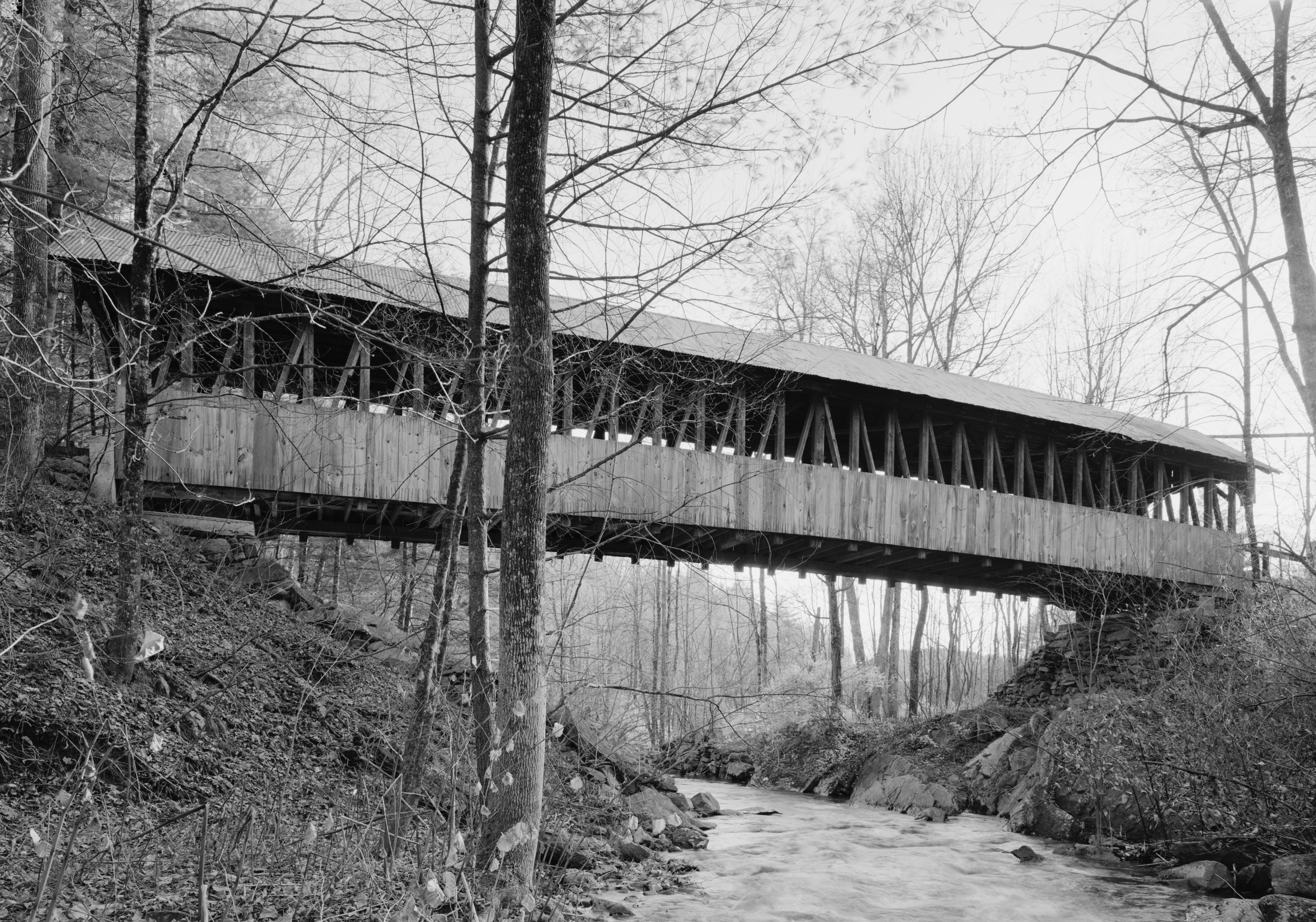
(image 9 of 14)
2003
(HAER)

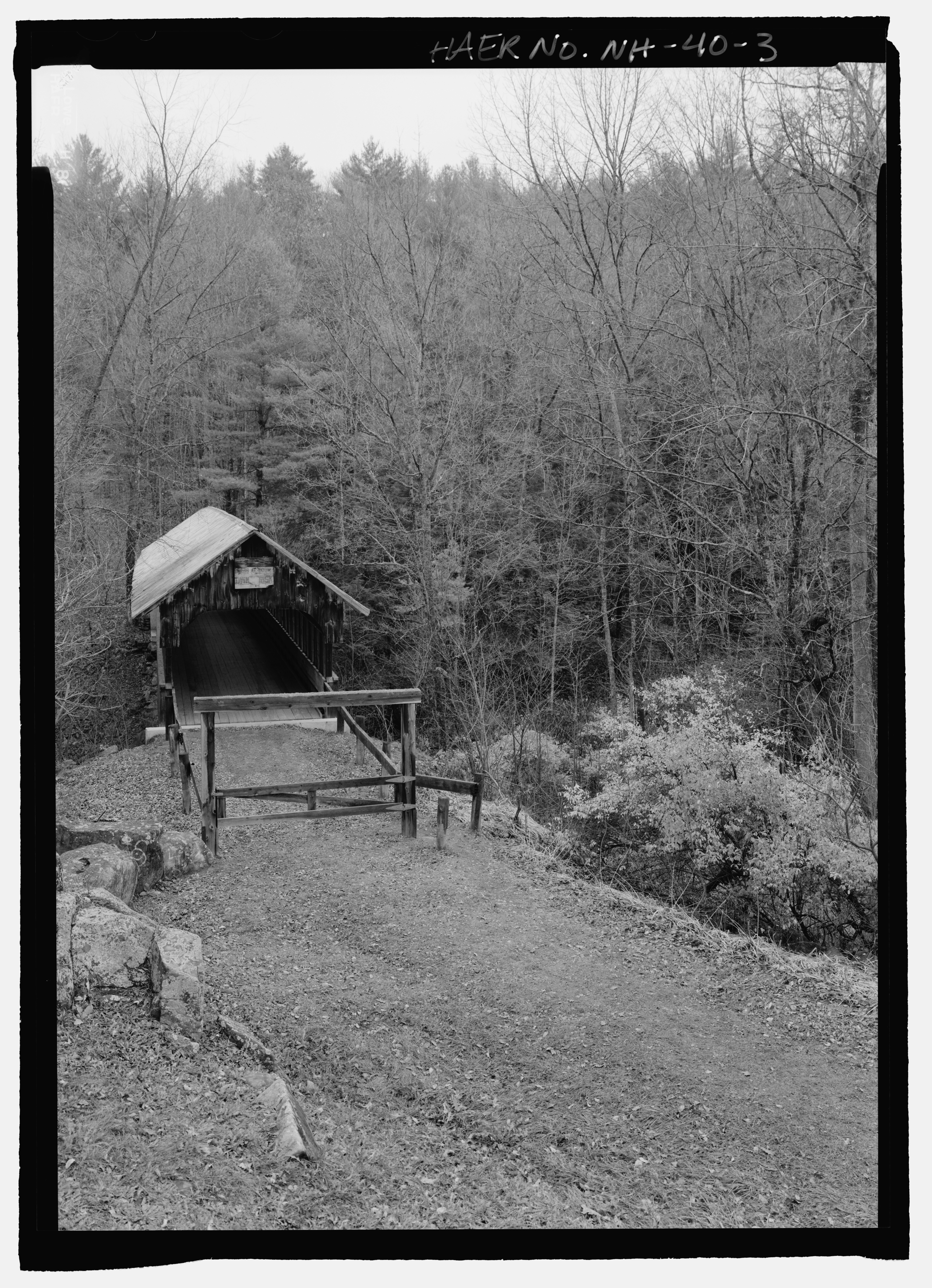
(image 10 of 14)
2003
Perspective showing roadway from the west, looking east (HAER)

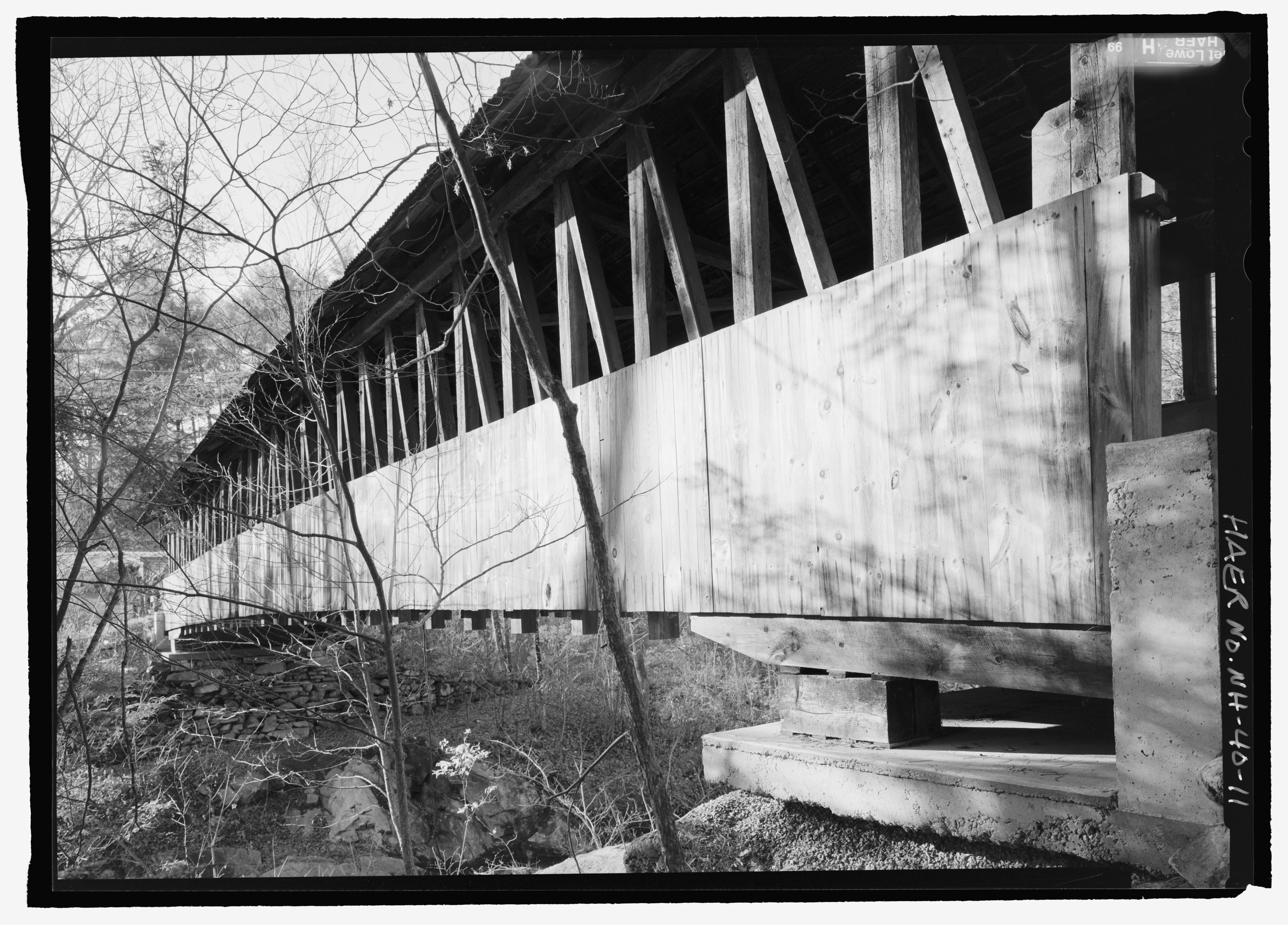
(image 11 of 14)
2003
Perspective, northwest by 295° (HAER)

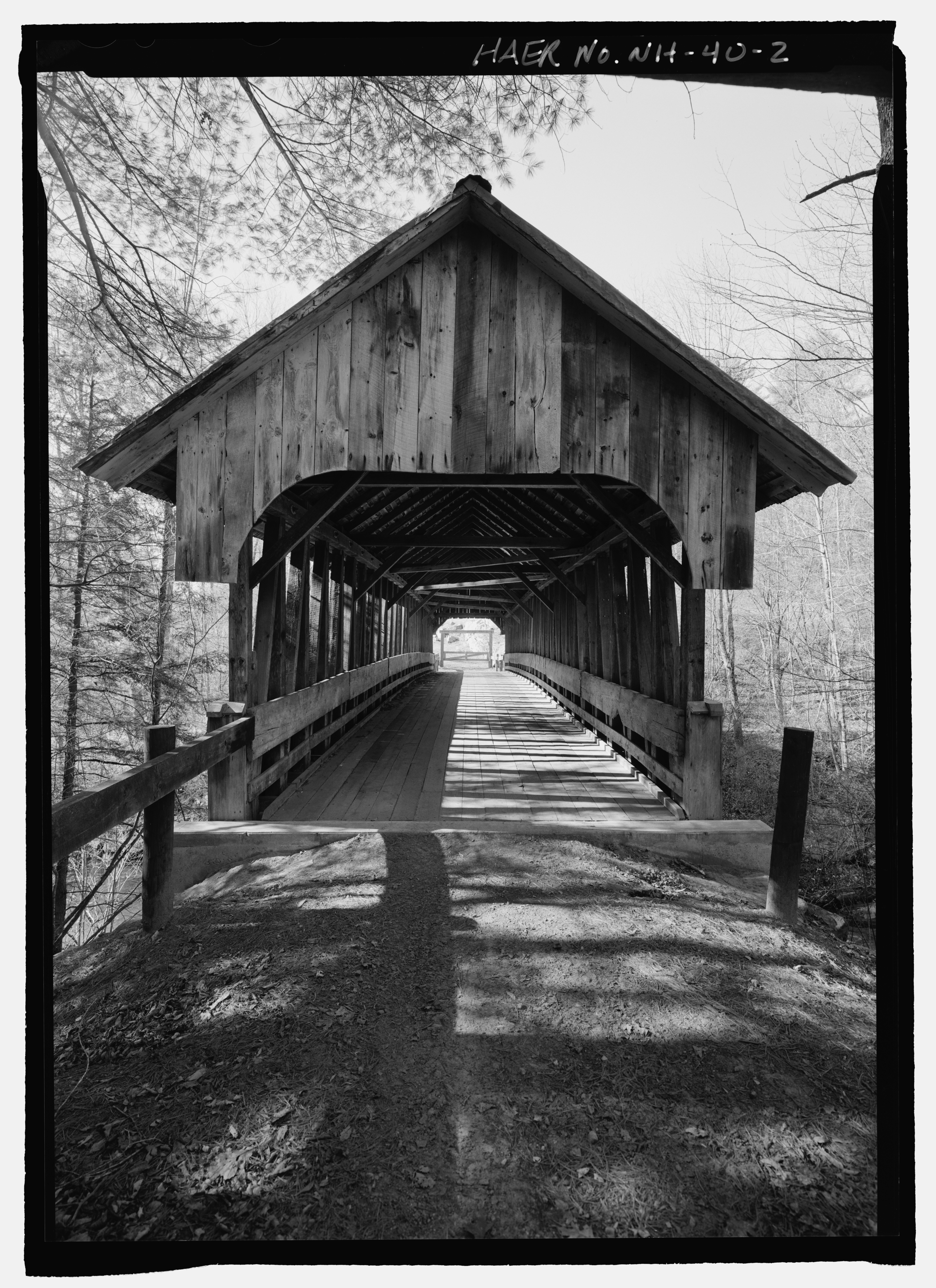
(image 12 of 14)
2003
Portal, east elevation (HAER)

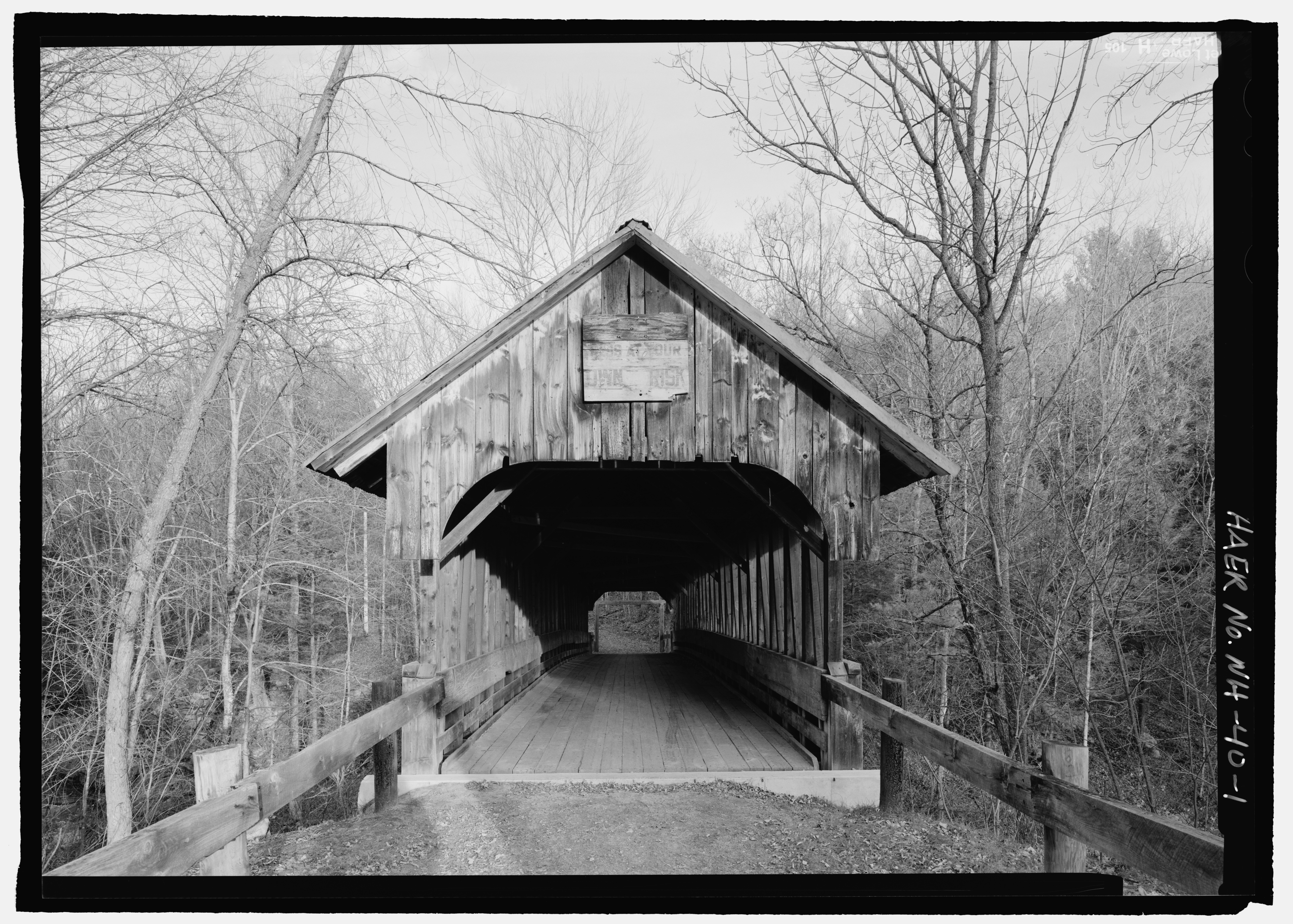
(image 13 of 14)
2003
Portal, west elevation, bearing due east (HAER)

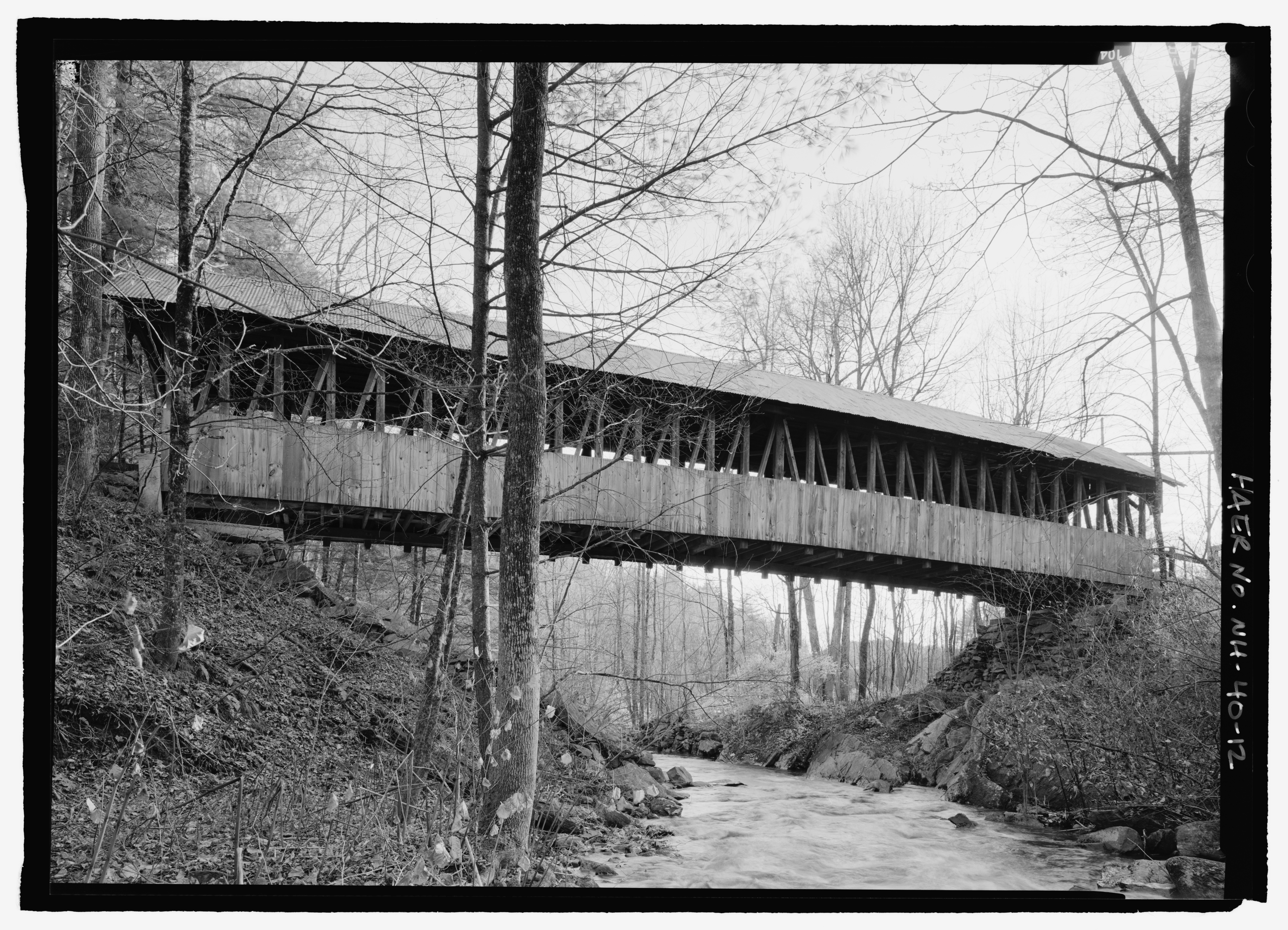
(image 14 of 14)
2003
Upstream elevation, bearing southwest 215° (HAER)

== See also ==
Other covered bridges in Cornish

- Blow-Me-Down Covered Bridge
- Cornish-Windsor Covered Bridge
- Dingleton Hill Covered Bridge

Covered bridges in nearby West Windsor, Vermont

- Best's Covered Bridge
- Bowers Covered Bridge

Other bridges elsewhere

- List of bridges documented by the Historic American Engineering Record in New Hampshire
- List of bridges on the National Register of Historic Places in New Hampshire
- List of bridges on the National Register of Historic Places in Vermont
- List of covered bridges in Vermont
- List of crossings of the Connecticut River
- List of New Hampshire covered bridges
- National Register of Historic Places listings in Sullivan County, New Hampshire
