= Dingleton Hill Covered Bridge =

- U.S. National Register of Historic Places
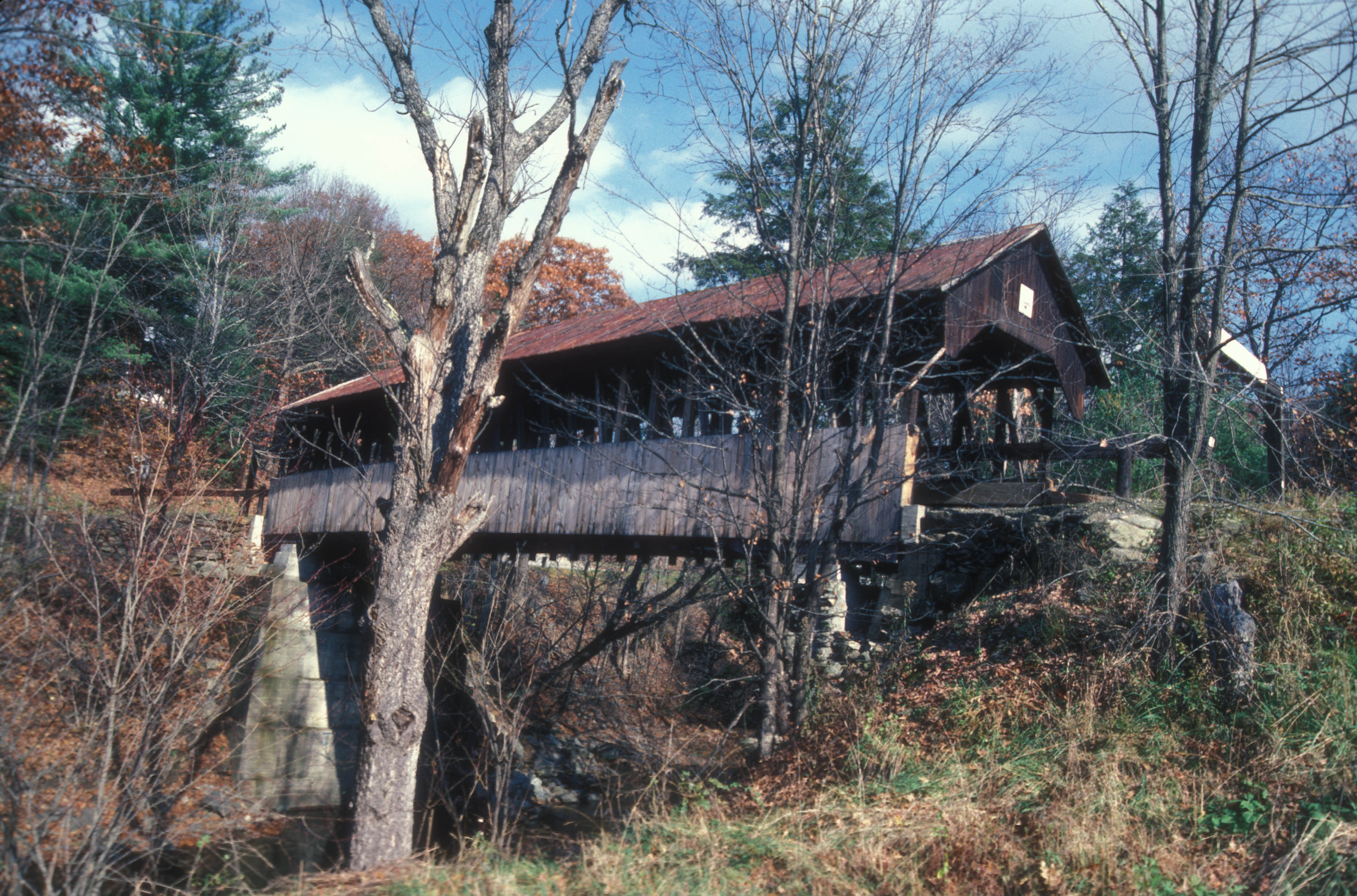

- Location within New Hampshire Location within the United States
- Location: Root Hill Road over Mill Brook, Cornish Mills, New Hampshire
- Coordinates: 43°27′51″N 72°22′9″W
- Area: 1 acre (0.40 ha)
- Built: 1882
- Built by: Tasker, James
- Architectural style: Kingpost Truss
- NRHP reference No.: 78000221
- Added to NRHP: November 8, 1978

The Dingleton Hill Covered Bridge, also known as the Cornish Mills Bridge, is a historic wooden covered bridge, carrying Root Hill Road over Mill Brook in Cornish Mills, New Hampshire. Built in 1882, it is one of the state's few surviving 19th-century covered bridges. It was listed on the National Register of Historic Places in 1978. It carries one lane of traffic, with a posted weight limit.

== Description and history ==
The Dingleton Hill Covered Bridge is located about 1 mile (1.6 km) east of New Hampshire Route 12, on Root Mill Road just south of Town House Road. The bridge is a single span King post truss structure running 79 feet (24 m), resting on an original stone abutment and a 1954 concrete abutment. Its original wood-shingle roof has been replaced by corrugated metal. Only the lower half of the trusses are sheathed with vertical planking; the upper half is exposed. The upper portion of the portals are finished in vertical board siding. Its interior is 14.5 feet (4.4 m) wide, carrying one lane of traffic.

The bridge was built in 1882 by James Tasker, a local builder, at a cost to the town of $812. It underwent a major restoration in 1983 by Milton Graton, after which there was a rededication ceremony attended by one of Tasker's descendants. The bridge was damaged in 2016 when a school bus (overweight for the posted limit, and overheight for its portals) crossed the bridge; the damage was repaired and the bridge reopened several months later.

On Town House Rd, at the intersection of Dingleton Hill Rd and Root Hill Rd, at the approximate DD coordinates of 43.4646, -72.3694, a sign for Covered Bridge No. 22 marks this bridge.

== See also ==
Other covered bridges in Cornish

- Blow-Me-Down Covered Bridge
- Blacksmith Shop Bridge, foot traffic only
- Cornish-Windsor Covered Bridge

Covered bridges in nearby West Windsor, Vermont

- Bowers Covered Bridge
- Best's Covered Bridge

Lists of bridges

- List of New Hampshire covered bridges

National Register listings of area bridges

- National Register of Historic Places listings in Sullivan County, New Hampshire
- List of bridges on the National Register of Historic Places in New Hampshire
