= Best's Covered Bridge =

- U.S. National Register of Historic Places
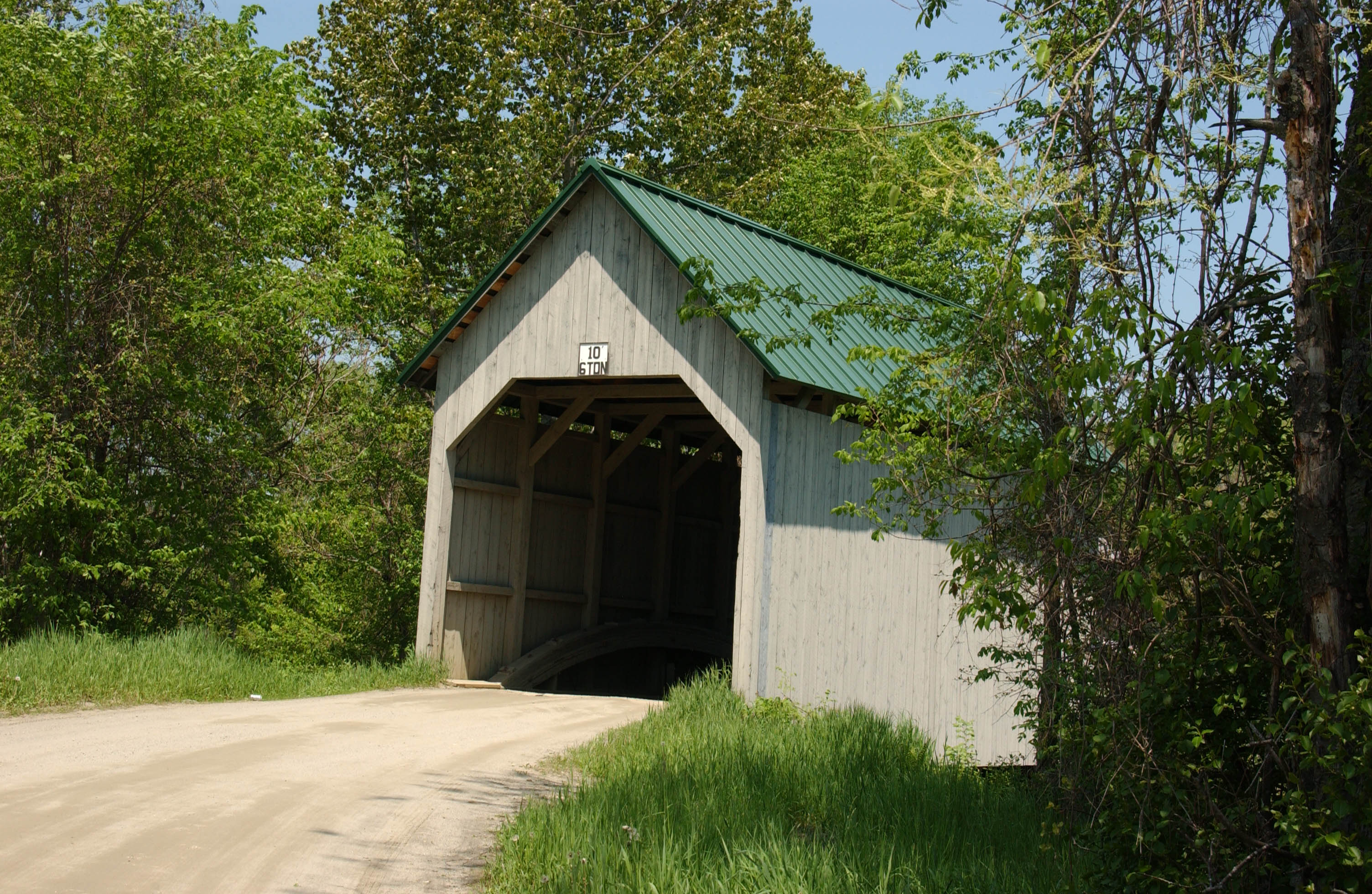

- Location within Vermont Location within the United States
- Location: About 8 miles (13 km) west of Windsor village, Churchill Road S. of Vermont Route 44, West Windsor, Vermont
- Coordinates: 43°27′19″N 72°30′58″W
- Area: 1 acre (0.40 ha)
- NRHP reference No.: 73000210
- Added to NRHP: July 2, 1973

Best's Covered Bridge (a.k.a. Swallow's Bridge) is a historic covered bridge in West Windsor, Vermont, that carries Churchill Road over Mill Brook, just south of Vermont Route 44. Built in 1889, it is an architecturally distinctive laminated arch structure with a post-and-beam superstructure. It was listed on the National Register of Historic Places in 1973.

== Description and history ==
Best's Covered Bridge is located about 8 miles (13 km) west of Windsor's village center, just south of VT 44 on Churchill Road. It is a single-span laminated arch structure, with a total length of 37 feet (11 m) and a roadway width of 12.5 feet (3.8 m) (one lane). It rests on stone abutments. The arch is formed out of five layers of planking that have been laminated and bolted together. The floor stringers are supported by iron suspension rods descending from the arches, which are complemented by wooden posts rising above the arches. The arches are protected by a post-and-beam frame structure, its exterior clad in vertical boarding, with a metal roof overhead.

The bridge was built in 1889 by Stephen F. Hammond (1836–1913), a local wheelwright from Brownsville. Some sources state that Amasa W. Swallow (1829–1894) built the bridge, an error that may have originated in a misreading of the 1889 town report. Documentary evidence suggests that the notation, "new covered bridge by Amasa W. Swallow," is actually a reference to the bridge's location.

The bridge's names come from Amasa W. Swallow, who owned the adjacent farm in the 1880s, and William Edgar Best (1869–1971), who in 1896, two years after Swallow's death, purchased the property.

The laminated arch construction is unusual for 19th-century bridges in Vermont, but is well suited for use on a short crossing on a lightly traveled road.

== See also ==
Other covered bridges in Windsor County, Vermont

- Bowers Covered Bridge
- Lincoln Covered Bridge
- Martin's Mill Covered Bridge (Hartland, Vermont)
- Taftsville Covered Bridge
- Willard Covered Bridge

Other covered bridges in nearby Cornish

- Blow-Me-Down Covered Bridge, built by James Tasker
- Blacksmith Shop Covered Bridge, now only foot traffic, built by James Tasker
- Dingleton Hill Covered Bridge, built by James Tasker
- Cornish-Windsor Covered Bridge, built by James Tasker

Other bridges elsewhere

- List of bridges documented by the Historic American Engineering Record in Vermont
- List of crossings of the Connecticut River
- List of New Hampshire covered bridges
- List of covered bridges in Vermont
- Old Blenheim Bridge – previous claim of longest single covered span
- Bridgeport Covered Bridge – another claim of longest single covered span
- Hartland Bridge – The longest covered bridge in the world (located in Hartland, New Brunswick, Canada)
- List of bridges on the National Register of Historic Places in New Hampshire
- List of bridges on the National Register of Historic Places in Vermont

National Register listings of area bridges

- National Register of Historic Places listings in Sullivan County, New Hampshire
- National Register of Historic Places listings in Windsor County, Vermont
