= Blow-Me-Down Covered Bridge =

- U.S. National Register of Historic Places
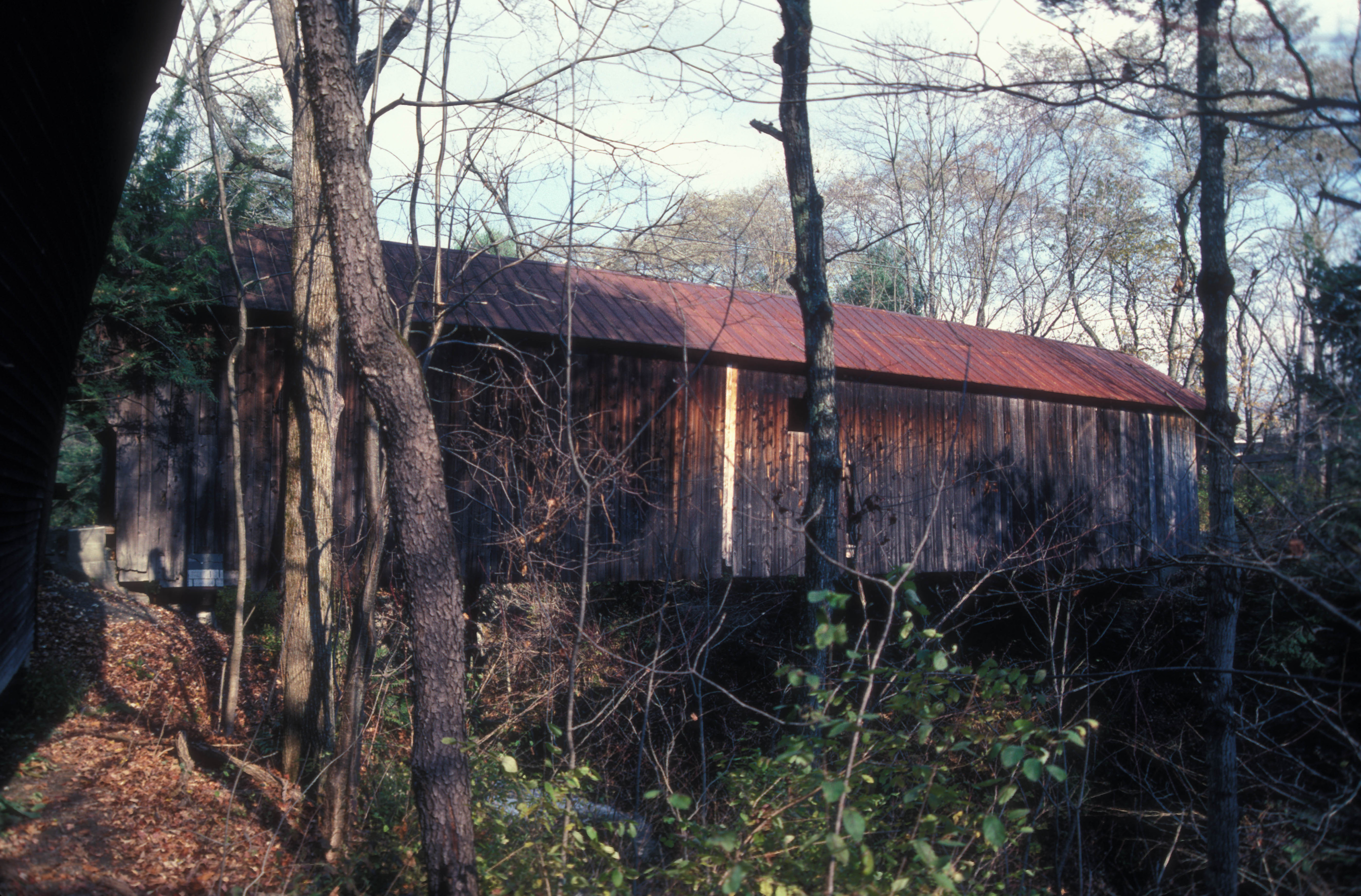

- Location within New Hampshire Location within the United States
- Nearest city: Plainfield, New Hampshire
- Coordinates: 43°31′2″N 72°22′28″W
- Area: 1 acre (0.40 ha)
- Built: 1877
- Architectural style: Kingpost Truss
- NRHP reference No.: 78000220
- Added to NRHP: May 19, 1978

The Blow-Me-Down Covered Bridge is a historic wooden covered bridge carrying Lang Road over Blow-me-down Brook in the town of Cornish, near its northern border with Plainfield, New Hampshire. Built in 1877, the kingpost structure is one of the state's few surviving 19th-century covered bridges. The bridge was listed on the National Register of Historic Places in 1978.

== Description ==
The Blow-Me-Down Covered Bridge is located in a rural section of Cornish, spanning Blow-me-down Brook on Lang Road a short way west of its junction with Platt Road. The bridge structure incorporates a single-span multiple kingpost truss that spans 85 feet (26 m) and has a roadway 14 feet (4.3 m) wide. It rests on natural granite ledges which have been levelled with dry-laid stone. It is covered by a metal roof, with vertical board siding on the sides and around the portals.

== History ==
The bridge was built in 1877 by James Frederick Tasker (1826–1903) for $528 (equivalent to $15,964 in 2025). The bridge was restored in 1980, and again in 2002. Its single lane is open to vehicular traffic, with a posted weight limit.

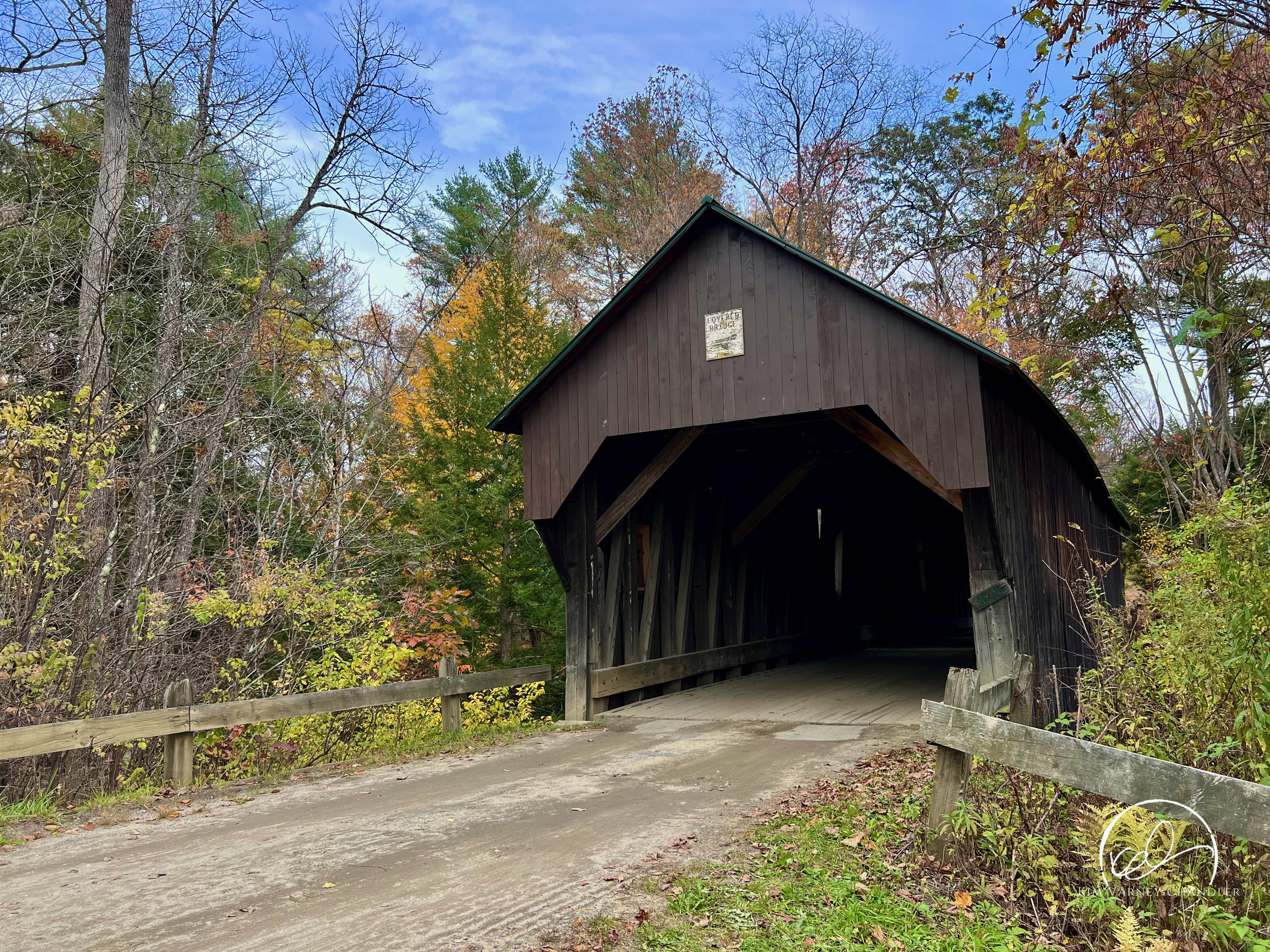
Blow-Me-Down Bridge, 2022

== See also ==
Other bridges in Cornish

- Dingleton Hill Covered Bridge
- Blacksmith Shop or Kenyon Bridge, foot traffic only
- Cornish–Windsor Covered Bridge

Bridges in West Windsor, Vermont

- Bowers Covered Bridge
- Best's Covered Bridge

List of bridges

- List of covered bridges in New Hampshire

National Register listings of area bridges

- National Register of Historic Places listings in Sullivan County, New Hampshire
- List of bridges on the National Register of Historic Places in New Hampshire
