= Blow-me-down Brook =

Stream in New Hampshire, United States

- Location within New Hampshire Location within the United States

Location
- Country: United States
- State: New Hampshire
- County: Sullivan
- Towns: Cornish, Plainfield

Physical characteristics
- Source: Stowell Hill
  - location: Cornish
  - coordinates: 43°30′1″N 72°13′48″W
  - elevation: 1,890 ft (576 m)
- Mouth: Connecticut River
  - location: Cornish
  - coordinates: 43°29′39″N 72°22′46″W
  - elevation: 305 ft (93 m)
- Length: 12.8 mi (20.6 km)

Basin features
- Tributaries
  - left: Notch Brook

Blow-me-down Brook is a 12.8-mile (20.6 km) long stream located in western New Hampshire in the United States. It is a tributary of the Connecticut River, which flows to Long Island Sound.

Blow-me-down Brook begins near the northeast border of the town of Cornish, New Hampshire, below Stowell Hill. It flows west, passing through the village of Cornish Flat, where it is joined by Notch Brook, then flows northwest into the town of Plainfield, where it takes a zig-zag course generally west, reentering Cornish shortly before its end at the Connecticut River. In Plainfield, it passes the villages of Hell Hollow and Mill Village and runs just east of Plainfield's town center. In its lower course in Cornish, the brook passes the village of Squag City and Saint-Gaudens National Historic Site. The Blow-Me-Down Covered Bridge crosses the brook at Squag City.

The watershed of Blow-me-down Brook extends to Croydon Mountain (sometimes known as Grantham Mountain and as Spruce Ball by most Cornish residents) in the northwestern corner of the town of Croydon, just east of the town's boundary with Cornish. The brook was dredged from a small dam at the northeastern edge of Cornish Flat to the bridge that crosses State Route 120. This was done sometime before 1945 in order to avoid flooding.

== See also ==
- List of rivers of New Hampshire
