= Balloch, New Hampshire =

Unincorporated community in New Hampshire, United States

- Unincorporated community
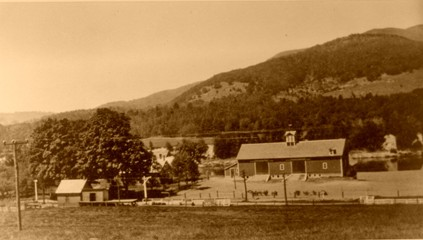
- Balloch Station c.1910 with Milk House on right, Balloch Farm in background

- Location within New Hampshire Location within the United States
- Coordinates: 43°25′56″N 72°23′33″W
- Country: United States
- State: New Hampshire
- County: Sullivan
- Town: Cornish
- Elevation: 364 ft (111 m)
- Time zone: UTC-5 (Eastern (EST))
  - Summer (DST): UTC-4 (EDT)
- Area code: 603
- GNIS feature ID: 871155

Balloch is an unincorporated community in the southwestern corner of the town of Cornish, New Hampshire, United States. The name is derived from the Balloch Farm, originally owned by James Balloch (1761–1840) and, later, by his son William Balloch (1820–1893). It was the site of a small Boston & Maine Railroad station, built in the 1890s and destroyed in a freight train derailment on February 12, 1928.

== History ==
The Balloch Farm was settled by James Balloch soon after his arrival in the United States in 1790. He married Sarah Chase, of the long-standing Cornish Chase family in 1796. Under his son, William, the farm prospered, producing milk for area creameries. The Sullivan County Railroad was constructed through the farm in 1849, with William Balloch serving as a contractor to the railroad. Starting in the 1890s, the Balloch station was built to ship this milk directly to processors, such as the Bellows Falls Cooperative Creamery.

== Balloch today ==
Balloch at one time was marked by the "Balloch's Crossing Farm & Forge" sign at the historic Balloch Farm (formerly the home of North Star Canoe Rentals). The railroad, now operated by the New England Central Railroad, continues to feature daily trains through Balloch, including its own freight trains, as well as freight trains of Pan Am Railways and the daily Vermonter passenger train of Amtrak.

== See also ==
- New Hampshire
- List of cities and towns in New Hampshire
- Cornish, New Hampshire
- George Williamson Balloch
