= Augusta Cooper Bristol =

American writer

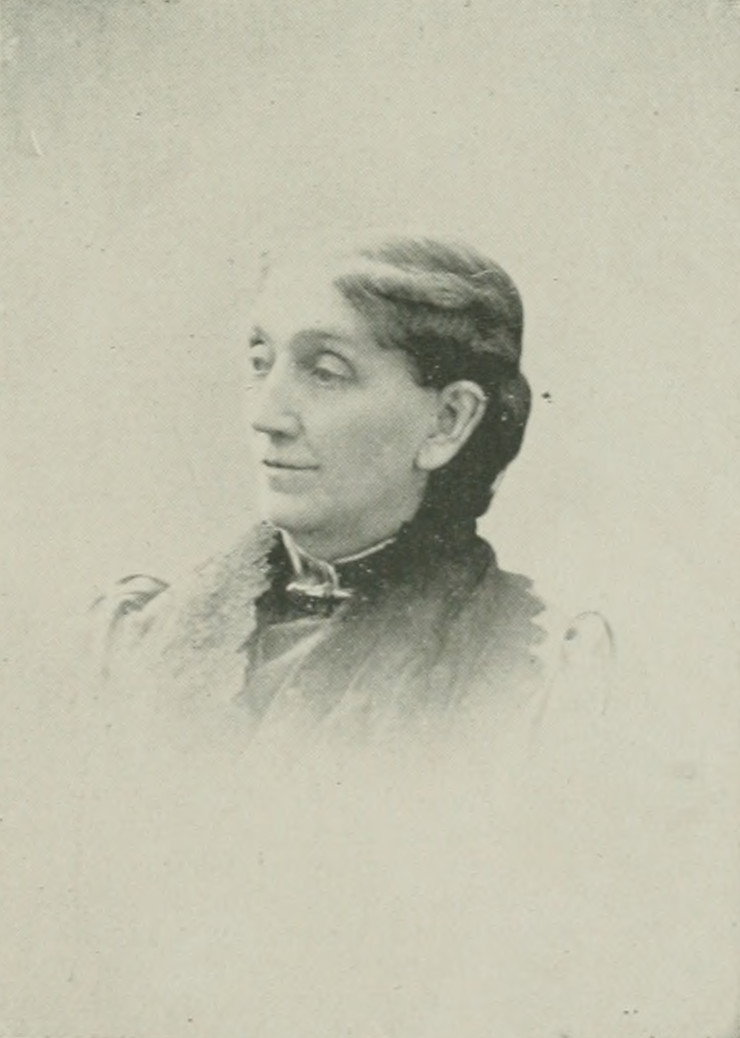
- "A Woman of the Century"
- Born: Augusta Cooper; April 17, 1835; Croydon, New Hampshire, U.S.
- Died: May 9, 1910 (aged 75); Vineland, New Jersey, U.S.
- Education: Canaan Union Academy, Kimball Union Academy
- Occupations: poet, lecturer
- Spouse(s): G. H. Kimball (m. 1857; div. 1862), Louis Bristol (m. 1866; died 1882)
- Writing career
- Language: English
- Literary movement: Positivism

Augusta Cooper Bristol (April 17, 1835 – May 9, 1910) was an American poet and lecturer. She began teaching at the age of fifteen. In 1869, she published a volume of poems, and, the same year, gave her first public lecture. Beginning in 1872, she was frequently called before the public as a speaker.

== Early years and education ==
Augusta Cooper was born in Croydon, New Hampshire, April 17, 1835. She was the youngest of a family of ten children of Col. Otis and Hannah (Powers) Cooper. Her first verses were written at the age of eight, and she had poems published when only fifteen. She excelled in mathematics and showed in her early life an aptitude for logical and philosophical reasoning. The greater part of her education was acquired in a public school, but she was also a student in Canaan Union Academy and Kimball Union Academy.

== Career ==
Bristol began teaching at fifteen during summer and winter for seven years. At the age of twenty-two, she married G. H. Kimball, from whom she was divorced five years later. In 1866, she married Louis Bristol, a lawyer of New Haven, Connecticut, and they removed to southern Illinois. In 1869, she published a volume of poems, of which, a review by The Congregationalist and Boston Recorder noted: "In Poems by Augusta Cooper Bristol, we fail to discern any remarkable poetic power. They seem to be characterized by a considerable command of language, and something of the poetic temper, with a good deal of the now fashionable cant of 'insight' and 'nature' and non-capital punishment, and things of that kind." In the same year, she gave her first public lecture, which changed the course of her intellectual career.

In 1872, she moved to Vineland, New Jersey, from which date she developed herself as a platform speaker before the public. For four years, she was president of the Ladies' social science class in Vineland, giving lessons from Herbert Spencer and Henry Charles Carey every month. In the winter of 1880, she gave a course of lectures before the New York Positivist Society on "The Involution of Character," followed by another course under the auspices of the Woman's Social Science Club of that city. In the following June, she was sent by friends in New York City to study the equitable association of labor and capital at the Familistère, in Guise, France, founded by Jean-Baptiste André Godin. She was also commissioned to represent the New York Positivist Society in an international convention of liberal thinkers in Brussels in September. Remaining in the Familistere for three months and giving a lecture on the "Scientific Basis of Morality" before the Brussels convention, she returned home and published the "Rules and Statutes" of the association in Guise. In 1881, she was chosen state lecturer of the Patrons of Husbandry in New Jersey. In the autumn of the following year, was employed on a national lecture bureau of that order.

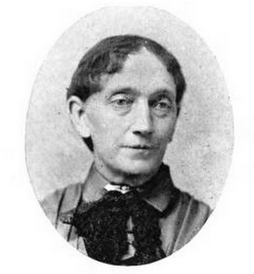
Augusta Cooper Bristol (1894)

After her husband's death in 1882, she seldom appeared upon the platform, but was one of the speakers in the World's Congress of Representative Women at the World's Columbian Exposition in Chicago (1893). She was occupied with the care of an estate and in directing the educational interests of her youngest daughter. Some of her philosophic and scientific lectures were translated and published in foreign countries. She died May 9, 1910, in Vineland.

== Selected works ==
- Poems, 1869
- The relation of the maternal function to the woman intellect, 1876
- Discours sur la science comme base de la morale, 1880
- The present phase of woman's advancement, 1880
- La science considérée dans ses rapports avec le caractère humain, 1882
- Labor, capital and temperance, 1885-1890?
- Words for wage-workers, 189?
- The web of life, 1895
- Spray of cosmos, 1904
- Present phase of women's advancement and other addresses, 1916
