= First Baptist Church of Cornish =

Historic church in New Hampshire, United States

- U.S. National Register of Historic Places
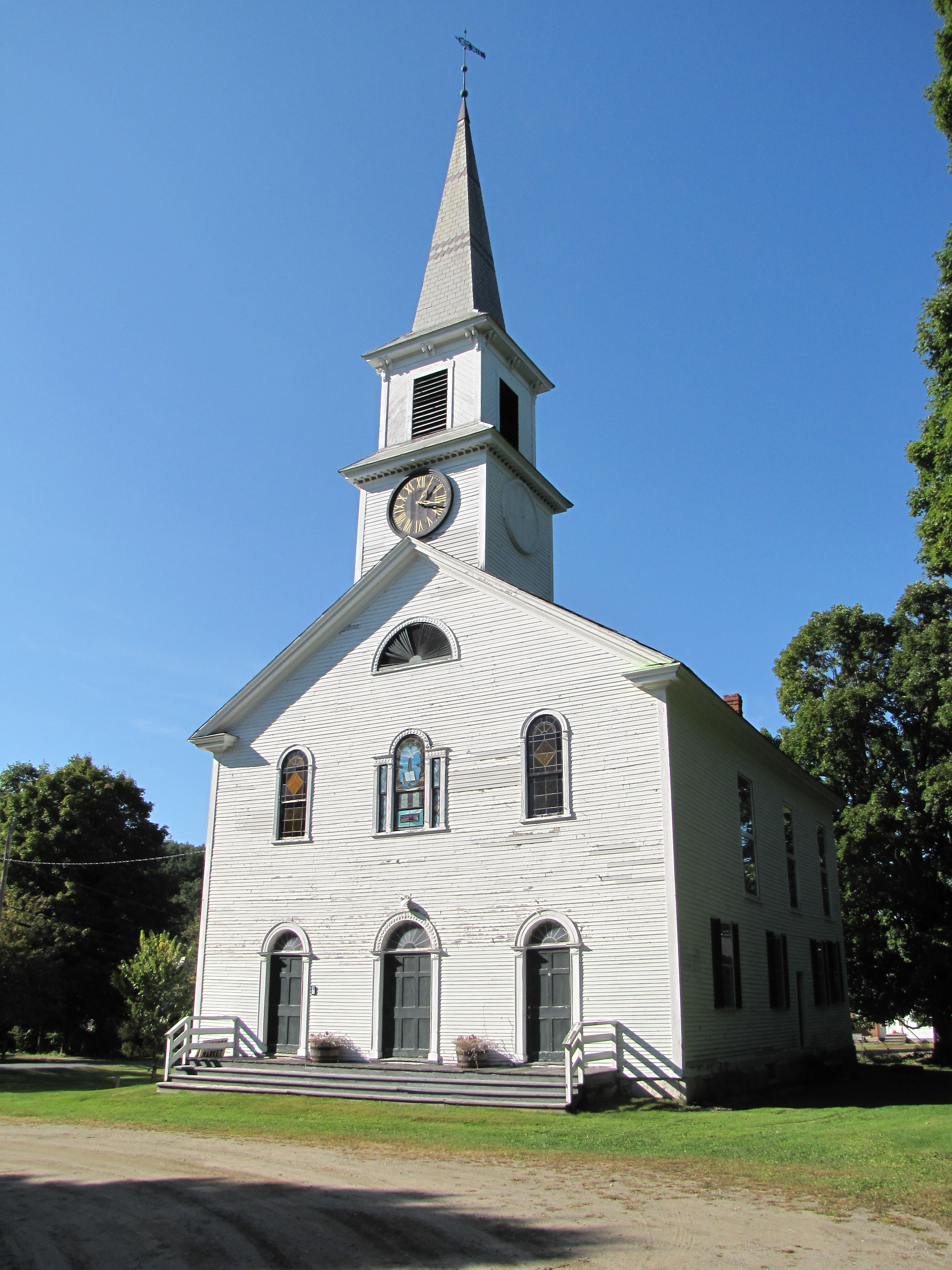

- Location within New Hampshire Location within the United States
- Location: Meeting House Road., Cornish Flat, New Hampshire
- Coordinates: 43°29′54″N 72°16′48″W
- Area: 1 acre (0.40 ha)
- Built: 1803
- Architectural style: Federal
- NRHP reference No.: 78000222
- Added to NRHP: February 14, 1978

The First Baptist Church of Cornish is a historic church on Meeting House Road at NH 120 in Cornish Flat, New Hampshire. Built in 1803, it is the town's oldest surviving church building, and is one of the state's oldest surviving Baptist churches. It was listed on the National Register of Historic Places in 1978.

== Description and history ==
The First Baptist Church of Cornish is sited prominently in the village of Cornish Flat, at the northern end of the town green at the northeast corner of Cornish Stage Road and New Hampshire Route 120. It is a two-story wood-frame structure, with a gabled roof and clapboarded exterior. A three-stage square tower rises above the front facade, with a clock in the second stage and belfry in the third. It is capped by a four-sided slate spire. The main facade is symmetrical, with a large Federal-style fan in the gable, doors topped by half-round transoms, and round-arch windows on the second level flanking a central Palladian window.

This structure was built in 1803, and is the town's oldest church building. Originally located at Harrington and Parsonage Hill roads, it was moved to its present location in 1818. It was originally built in the style of a colonial meeting house, with square pews and a gallery; the pews were removed during alterations in 1845–46, at which time the gallery level was built over into a second story. The building's Federal styling appears to have been inspired by the publications of Asher Benjamin, a resident of nearby Windsor, Vermont.

== See also ==
- National Register of Historic Places listings in Sullivan County, New Hampshire
- New Hampshire Historical Marker No. 265: Cornish Meetinghouse
