= Croydon, New Hampshire =

Town in New Hampshire, U.S.

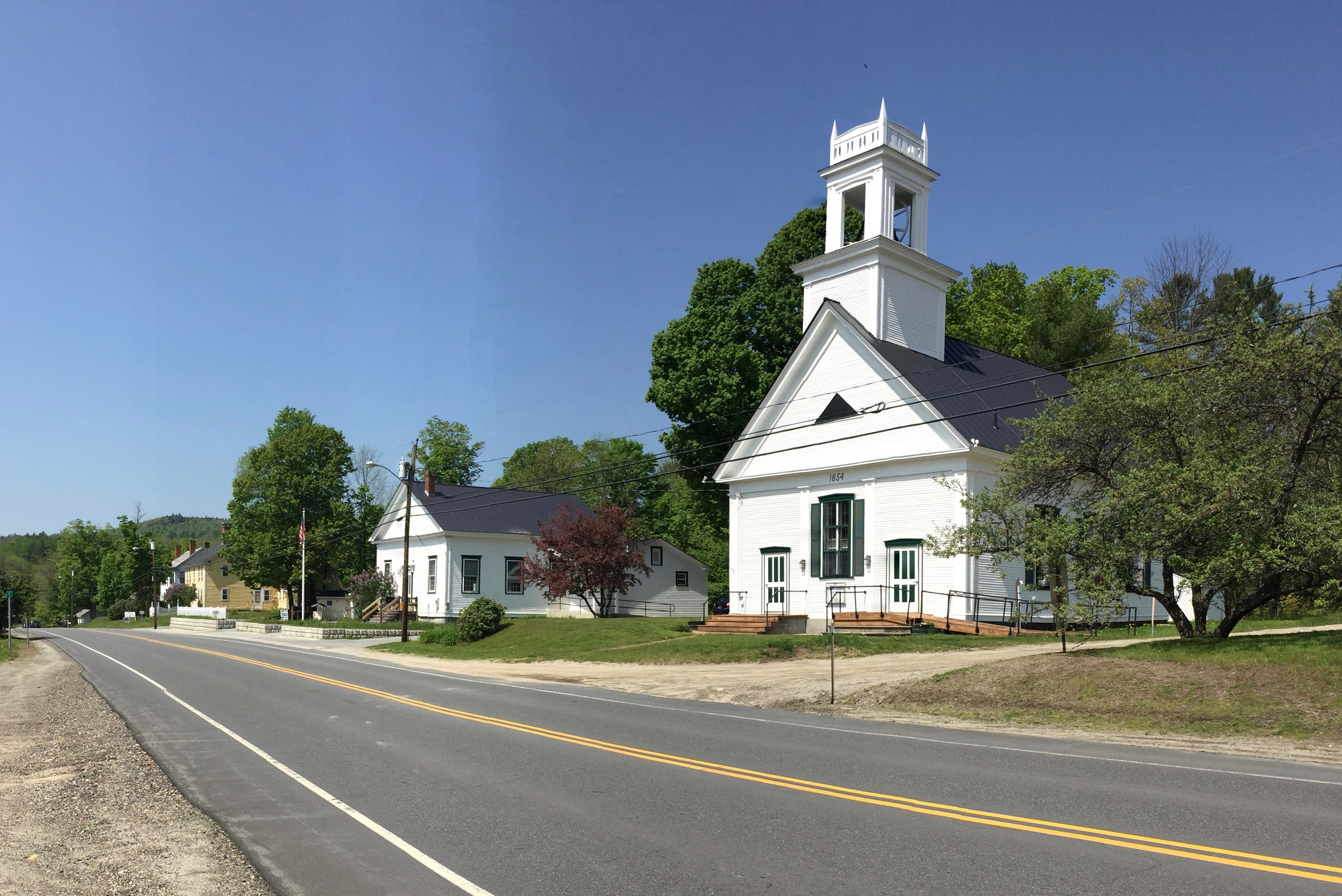
- Croydon town center: Town Hall on left, First Congregational Church on right

- Location in Sullivan County and the state of New Hampshire.
- Coordinates: 43°26′48″N 72°11′25″W
- Country: United States
- State: New Hampshire
- County: Sullivan
- Incorporated: 1763
- Villages: Croydon; Croydon Flat

Area
  - Total: 37.5 sq mi (97.2 km^{2})
  - Land: 36.8 sq mi (95.2 km^{2})
  - Water: 0.77 sq mi (2.0 km^{2}) 2.07%
- Elevation: 1,243 ft (379 m)

Population (2020)
  - Total: 801
  - Density: 22/sq mi (8.4/km^{2})
- Time zone: UTC-5 (Eastern)
  - Summer (DST): UTC-4 (Eastern)
- ZIP code: 03773
- Area code: 603
- FIPS code: 33-16340
- GNIS feature ID: 873572
- Website: croydon-nh.com

Croydon is a town in Sullivan County, New Hampshire, United States. The population was 801 at the 2020 census.

== History ==
Incorporated in 1763, the town takes its name from Croydon, a suburb of London, England.

Croydon was home to Ruel Durkee, a powerful 19th century political boss in the state. The town of "Coniston" in the 1906 best-selling novel of the same name, by American author Winston Churchill, is based on Croydon, and Durkee was portrayed as "Jethro Bass". The local Coniston General Store is named after the novel, as are YMCA Camp Coniston and Lake Coniston in the eastern part of the town.

== Geography ==
According to the United States Census Bureau, the town has a total area of 37.5 square miles (97.2 km^{2}), of which 36.8 square miles (95.2 km^{2}) are land and 0.77 square miles (2.0 km^{2}) are water, comprising 2.07% of the town. The highest point in town is Croydon Peak, at 2,760 feet (840 m) above sea level near the northwestern corner of the town. The North Branch Sugar River flows southward through the east-central part of the town. Croydon lies fully within the Connecticut River watershed.

Croydon is home to Corbin Park, one of the largest private game reserves in New England. The 24,000-acre (9,700 ha) fenced-in expanse of woodlands and mountainous terrain features bison, European boar and elk and extends into neighboring towns.

=== Adjacent municipalities ===
- Grantham (north)
- Springfield (northeast)
- Sunapee (east)
- Newport (south)
- Cornish (west)
- Plainfield (northwest)

== Demographics ==
Historical population
Census	Pop.	Note	%±
1790	537		—
1800	984		83.2%
1810	864		−12.2%
1820	1,060		22.7%
1830	1,057		−0.3%
1840	956		−9.6%
1850	861		−9.9%
1860	755		−12.3%
1870	652		−13.6%
1880	608		−6.7%
1890	512		−15.8%
1900	372		−27.3%
1910	324		−12.9%
1920	230		−29.0%
1930	269		17.0%
1940	312		16.0%
1950	349		11.9%
1960	312		−10.6%
1970	396		26.9%
1980	457		15.4%
1990	627		37.2%
2000	661		5.4%
2010	764		15.6%
2020	801		4.8%
U.S. Decennial Census

As of the census of 2000, there were 661 people, 264 households, and 194 families living in the town. The population density was 17.8 inhabitants per square mile (6.9/km^{2}). There were 354 housing units at an average density of 9.5 per square mile (3.7/km^{2}). The racial makeup of the town was 97.43% White, 0.45% Native American, 0.15% Asian, 0.76% from other races, and 1.21% from two or more races. Hispanic or Latino of any race were 0.61% of the population.

There were 264 households, out of which 29.2% had children under the age of 18 living with them, 58.0% were married couples living together, 8.3% had a female householder with no husband present, and 26.5% were non-families. 19.3% of all households were made up of individuals, and 8.7% had someone living alone who was 65 years of age or older. The average household size was 2.50 and the average family size was 2.71.

In the town, the population was spread out, with 22.7% under the age of 18, 4.7% from 18 to 24, 30.4% from 25 to 44, 30.0% from 45 to 64, and 12.3% who were 65 years of age or older. The median age was 41 years. For every 100 females, there were 109.2 males. For every 100 females age 18 and over, there were 102.0 males.

The median income for a household in the town was $49,688, and the median income for a family was $50,556. Males had a median income of $31,992 versus $26,544 for females. The per capita income for the town was $21,403. About 2.5% of families and 4.9% of the population were below the poverty line, including 5.0% of those under age 18 and 9.7% of those age 65 or over.

== Politics ==
In recent decades, Croydon has supported Republicans in presidential elections.

Croydon city vote by party in presidential elections
Year	Democratic	Republican	Third Parties
2016	30.00% 126	64.52% 271	5.48% 23
2012	44.44% 196	52.83% 233	2.72% 12
2008	45.27% 182	53.73% 216	1.00% 4
2004	38.57% 157	60.93% 248	0.49% 2
2000	27.86% 90	63.47% 205	8.67% 28
1996	33.33% 95	53.68% 153	12.98% 37
1988	31.67% 70	67.42% 149	0.91% 2
1984	29.63% 56	70.37% 133	0.00% 0

In 2022, Croydon made headlines after citizens organized an emergency town meeting against a school board amendment that had cut the public school budget by more than half. Repeal of the amendment passed by 377–2. The story of the repeal was covered on This American Life on July 29, 2022.

== Notable people ==
- Augusta Cooper Bristol (1835–1910), poet, lecturer
- Jonas Cutting (1800–1876), Maine Supreme Judicial Court justice
- Wallace L. Dow (1844–1911), architect
- Whitman G. Ferrin (1818–1896), attorney and politician
- Samuel Read Hall (1795–1877), educator
- Gershom Powers (1789–1831), United States representative
- Baron Stow (1801–1869), Baptist minister
