= Cornish, New Hampshire =

Town in New Hampshire, United States

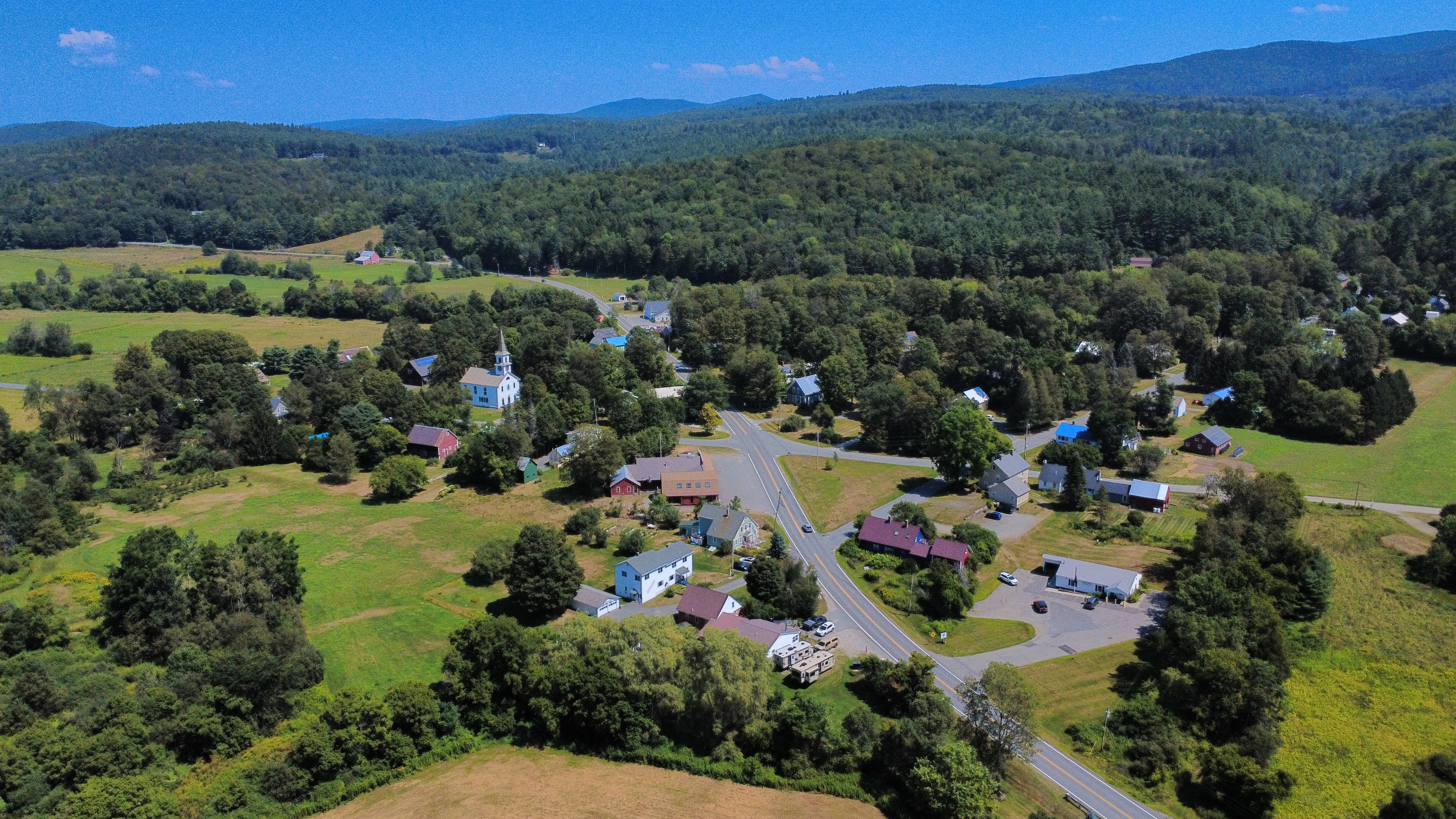
- Cornish Flat, NH, from the southwest

- Location of Cornish in Sullivan County, New Hampshire and of Sullivan County in New Hampshire
- Coordinates: 43°28′27″N 72°19′12″W
- Country: United States
- State: New Hampshire
- County: Sullivan
- Incorporated: 1765
- Villages: Cornish Center; Cornish City; Cornish Flat; Cornish Mills; Balloch; South Cornish

Area
  - Total: 42.6 sq mi (110.4 km^{2})
  - Land: 42.0 sq mi (108.7 km^{2})
  - Water: 0.66 sq mi (1.7 km^{2}) 1.54%
- Elevation: 1,119 ft (341 m)

Population (2020)
  - Total: 1,616
  - Density: 39/sq mi (14.9/km^{2})
- Time zone: UTC−5 (Eastern)
  - Summer (DST): UTC−4 (Eastern)
- ZIP Codes: 03745 (Cornish); 03746 (Cornish Flat)
- Area code: 603
- FIPS code: 33-15060
- GNIS feature ID: 873571
- Website: cornish.nh.gov

Cornish is a town in Sullivan County, New Hampshire, United States. The population was 1,616 at the 2020 census. Cornish has four covered bridges. Each August, it is home to the Cornish Fair.

== History ==
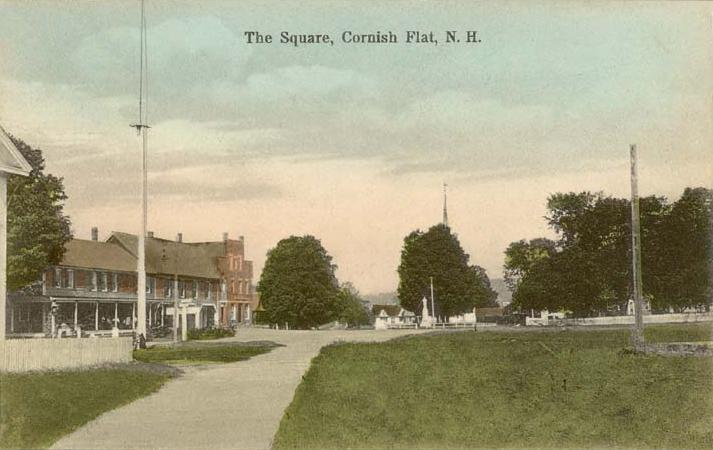
The Square in 1917

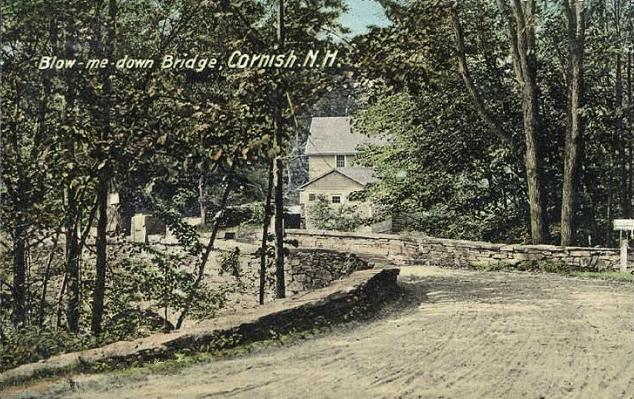
Blow-me-down Brook bridge in 1908, completed in 1888

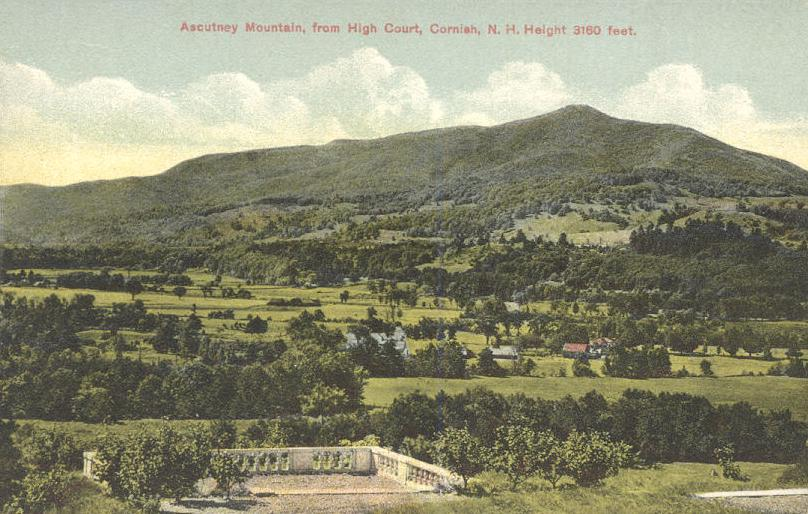
Mount Ascutney c. 1910

The town was granted in 1763 and contained an area once known as "Mast Camp", because it was the shipping point for the tall masts floated down the river by English settlers. It was incorporated in 1765 by colonial governor Benning Wentworth and named for Sir Samuel Cornish, a distinguished admiral of the Royal Navy. Since the 1827 partition of Cheshire County, the town has been within Sullivan County.

Since the late 19th century, Cornish has been a well-known summer resort for artists and writers. Sculptor Augustus Saint-Gaudens began coming to Cornish in 1885, seeking a studio away from the summer heat of New York City. Artist friends followed him, including painter and illustrator Maxfield Parrish, who designed and built his estate, the Oaks, in the area. The surrounding area became the center of the popular Cornish Art Colony. Cornish was the residence of the reclusive author J. D. Salinger from the 1950s until his death in 2010.

Until 2008, when the Smolen–Gulf Bridge opened in Ohio, Cornish had been home to the longest covered bridge (still standing) in the United States. Cornish remains home to the longest two-span covered bridge in the world. The Cornish–Windsor Covered Bridge spans the Connecticut River and was built in 1866 at an original cost of $9,000. Cornish also has three other covered bridges: the Blow-Me-Down Covered Bridge, Dingleton Hill Covered Bridge, and Kenyon Bridge.

== Geography ==
According to the United States Census Bureau, the town has a total area of 42.6 square miles (110.4 km^{2}), of which 42.0 square miles (108.7 km^{2}) are land and 0.66 square miles (1.7 km^{2}) are water, comprising 1.54% of the town. The Connecticut River forms the western boundary of the town, which is also the New Hampshire–Vermont border. The town is drained by direct tributaries of the Connecticut: Blow-me-down Brook, Mill Brook, and Walker Brook; and by Redwater Brook, which flows south to the Sugar River in Claremont before that river joins the Connecticut. The long ridge of Croydon Mountain follows the eastern boundary of town; the highest point in town is a knob on Croydon Mountain which reaches an elevation of 2,323 ft (708 m) above sea level. The eastern part of the town is a portion of the approximately 25,000-acre (100 km^{2}) Blue Mountain Forest Association private game preserve, also known locally as Corbin Park, named after its founder, Austin Corbin.

Cornish is dotted with several small villages, including Cornish Center, Cornish Flat, Cornish City, Cornish Mills, South Cornish, Balloch, and Squag City.

Cornish is served by state routes 12A and 120, both of which connect Claremont to the south with Lebanon to the north.

== Adjacent municipalities ==
- Plainfield (north)
- Croydon (east)
- Claremont (south)
- Windsor, Vermont (west)

== Demographics ==
Historical population
Census	Pop.	Note	%±
1790	982		—
1800	1,268		29.1%
1810	1,606		26.7%
1820	1,701		5.9%
1830	1,687		−0.8%
1840	1,726		2.3%
1850	1,606		−7.0%
1860	1,520		−5.4%
1870	1,334		−12.2%
1880	1,156		−13.3%
1890	954		−17.5%
1900	962		0.8%
1910	1,005		4.5%
1920	844		−16.0%
1930	855		1.3%
1940	790		−7.6%
1950	989		25.2%
1960	1,106		11.8%
1970	1,268		14.6%
1980	1,390		9.6%
1990	1,659		19.4%
2000	1,661		0.1%
2010	1,640		−1.3%
2020	1,616		−1.5%
U.S. Decennial Census

As of the 2020 Census, the total population was 1,616, with a total of 761 housing units, 707 of which were occupied. The town's residents consisted of 1 American Indian or Alaska Native, 9 Asian, 7 Black or African American, 12 Some Other Race, 92 Two or More Races, and 1,495 White. 18 residents were Hispanic or Latino, and 1,494 Not Hispanic or Latino. As of the 2015-19 American Community Survey, 41.9% of the population had a bachelor's degree or higher. The median household income was $82,083, and the median age was 54.1, with 28.8% being age 65 or older. 8.6% were veterans. Home ownership rate was 92.6%.

As of the census of 2000, there were 1,661 people, 645 households, and 465 families residing in the town. The population density was 39.4 inhabitants per square mile (15.2/km^{2}). There were 697 housing units at an average density of 16.5 per square mile (6.4/km^{2}). The racial makeup of the town was 97.71% White, 0.30% African American, 0.30% Native American, 0.12% Asian, 0.12% Pacific Islander, 0.30% from other races, and 1.14% from two or more races. Hispanic or Latino of any race were 0.48% of the population.

There were 645 households, out of which 32.2% had children under the age of 18 living with them, 62.9% were married couples living together, 5.4% had a female householder with no husband present, and 27.8% were non-families. Of all households 21.2% were made up of individuals, and 7.4% had someone living alone who was 65 years of age or older. The average household size was 2.57 and the average family size was 3.02.

In the town, the population was spread out, with 25.9% under the age of 18, 3.8% from 18 to 24, 26.4% from 25 to 44, 31.8% from 45 to 64, and 12.2% who were 65 years of age or older. The median age was 42 years. For every 100 females, there were 100.1 males. For every 100 females age 18 and over, there were 100.2 males.

The median income for a household in the town was $53,393, and the median income for a family was $60,313. Males had a median income of $36,115 versus $29,474 for females. The per capita income for the town was $23,165. About 2.8% of families and 4.5% of the population were below the poverty line, including 5.8% of those under age 18 and 5.5% of those age 65 or over.

== Sites of interest ==
- Balloch, New Hampshire
- Cornish Flat, New Hampshire
- Covered bridges:
  - Blow-Me-Down Covered Bridge
  - Cornish-Windsor Covered Bridge
  - Dingleton Hill Covered Bridge
  - Kenyon Bridge
- Saint-Gaudens National Historical Park
- New Hampshire Historical Marker No. 265: Cornish Meetinghouse
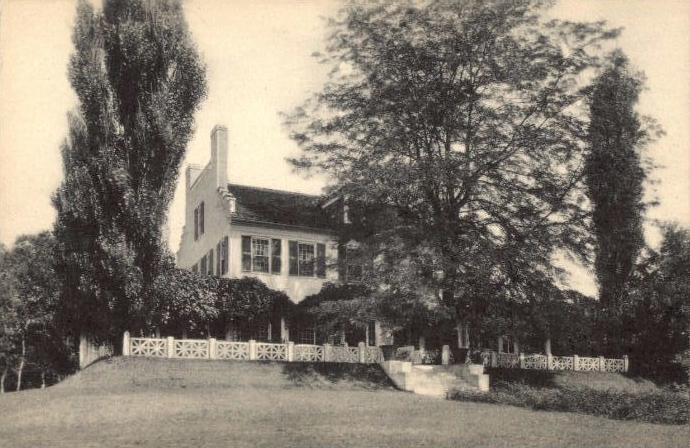
Aspet, home of Augustus Saint-Gaudens

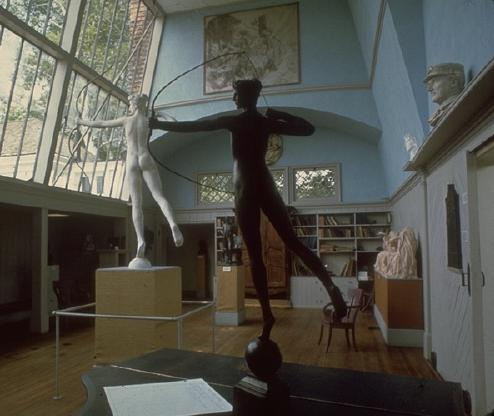
Saint-Gaudens National Historic Site

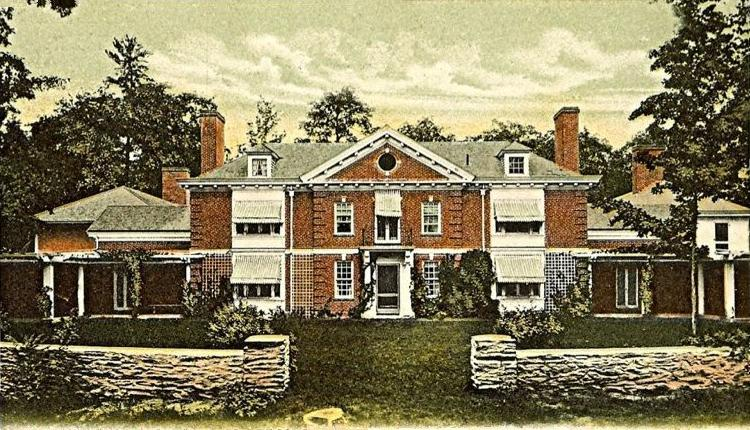
Harlakenden House, built at Cornish, New Hampshire in 1898, summer White House to Woodrow Wilson, burned in 1923

== Notable people ==
- Champion S. Chase (1820–1898), politician
- Dudley Chase (1771–1846), state's attorney of Orange County, Vermont, Speaker of the Vermont House of Representatives, Chief Justice of the Vermont Supreme Court, U.S. senator from Vermont
- Jonathan Chase (1732–1800), Revolutionary War officer
- Philander Chase (1775–1852), founder of Kenyon College, sixth Presiding Bishop of the U.S. Episcopal Church
- Salmon P. Chase (1808–1873), sixth Chief Justice of the United States, 25th United States secretary of the treasury, 23rd governor of Ohio, U.S. senator from Ohio; born in Cornish
- Winston Churchill (1871–1947), novelist; no relation to the British statesman of the same name
- Herbert Croly (1869–1930), author; co-founder of the magazine The New Republic
- Thomas Wilmer Dewing (1851–1938), painter; founding member of the Ten American Painters and taught at the Art Students League of New York
- Michael Dorris (1945–1997), novelist, scholar
- Julie Duncan (1919–1986), actress, champion steeplechase rider
- Louise Erdrich (born 1954), author
- Hamlin Garland (1860–1940), novelist, poet, essayist, short story writer, Georgist, psychical researcher; best known for his fiction involving hard-working Midwestern farmers
- Christian Gerhartsreiter (born 1961), impostor, convicted murderer
- James Hall (1802–1889), founder of Maryland-in-Africa
- Learned Hand (1872–1961), judge
- Percy MacKaye (1875–1956), playwright, poet
- Charles A. Platt (1861–1933), architect
- Samuel L. Powers (1848–1929), US congressman
- Augustus Saint-Gaudens (1848–1907), sculptor of the Beaux-Arts generation who embodied the ideals of the American Renaissance
- Louis St. Gaudens (1854–1913), significant American sculptor of the Beaux-Arts generation; brother of renowned sculptor Augustus Saint-Gaudens; Louis later changed the spelling of his name to St. Gaudens to differentiate himself from his well-known brother
- J. D. Salinger (1919–2010), writer, best known for his 1951 novel The Catcher in the Rye
- Nathan Smith (1762–1829), physician, founder of Dartmouth and Yale medical schools
- Nathan Ryno Smith (1797–1877), surgeon, professor, son of Nathan Smith
- Betsey Ann Stearns (1830–1914), inventor
- Woodrow Wilson (1856–1924), U.S. president; summer resident at author Winston Churchill's Harlakenden House
