= Corbin Park =

Game preserve in New Hampshire

Coordinates: 43°27′11″N 72°13′24″W

Corbin Park (also known as the Blue Mountain Forest and Game Preserve) is a private game reserve in New Hampshire. It contains land in Claremont, Newport, Croydon, Cornish, Plainfield, and Grantham. It occupies somewhere between 24,000 and 26,000 acres (97 and 105 km^{2}) of land and was started in 1889 by businessman Austin Corbin. The park is known today for its secrecy.

== History ==
Austin Corbin founded the park in 1889 by buying up a large number of parcels of land in western New Hampshire. The nonprofit Blue Mountain Association was created in 1891 to manage the park. After Corbin died in 1896, his son Austin Jr. took over management of the Association and the park, and held the role until his own death in 1938. In 1944 ownership of the park was transferred to a group of wealthy hunters. In 1949, the New Hampshire legislature passed a law holding the park responsible for escaped pigs. The park has been subject to multiple lawsuits from the 1950s to the 1990s.

In 2020, NH state representative Renny Cushing filed legislation to require a special safari hunting license to take exotic game from the park. It was not passed.

== Geography ==
Croydon Peak, the highest mountain in Sullivan County at 2,760 feet (840 m) of elevation, is located within the park boundary. It is not accessible to hikers. Croydon Peak is also the location of Sullivan County's only fire tower, but, as the mountain as a whole is inaccessible to the public, the fire tower is also inaccessible to the public.

== Flora and fauna ==
Corbin Park is home to bison, deer, elk, pheasants, and wild hogs. Some of these animals have been known to escape on several occasions, such as when the 1938 New England hurricane knocked down much of the park fence, or when the gates were left open in 1953 for firefighting purposes. A wild boar that had escaped from Corbin Park was struck and killed on Interstate 89 in Lebanon in 2017.

== Notable hunters ==
Many famous people have been known to hunt at or otherwise visit the park, including Teddy Roosevelt, Grover Cleveland, Herbert Hoover, Rudyard Kipling, Joe DiMaggio, William Ruger, Sr., and his son, William Junior.
