= Bowers Covered Bridge =

- U.S. National Register of Historic Places
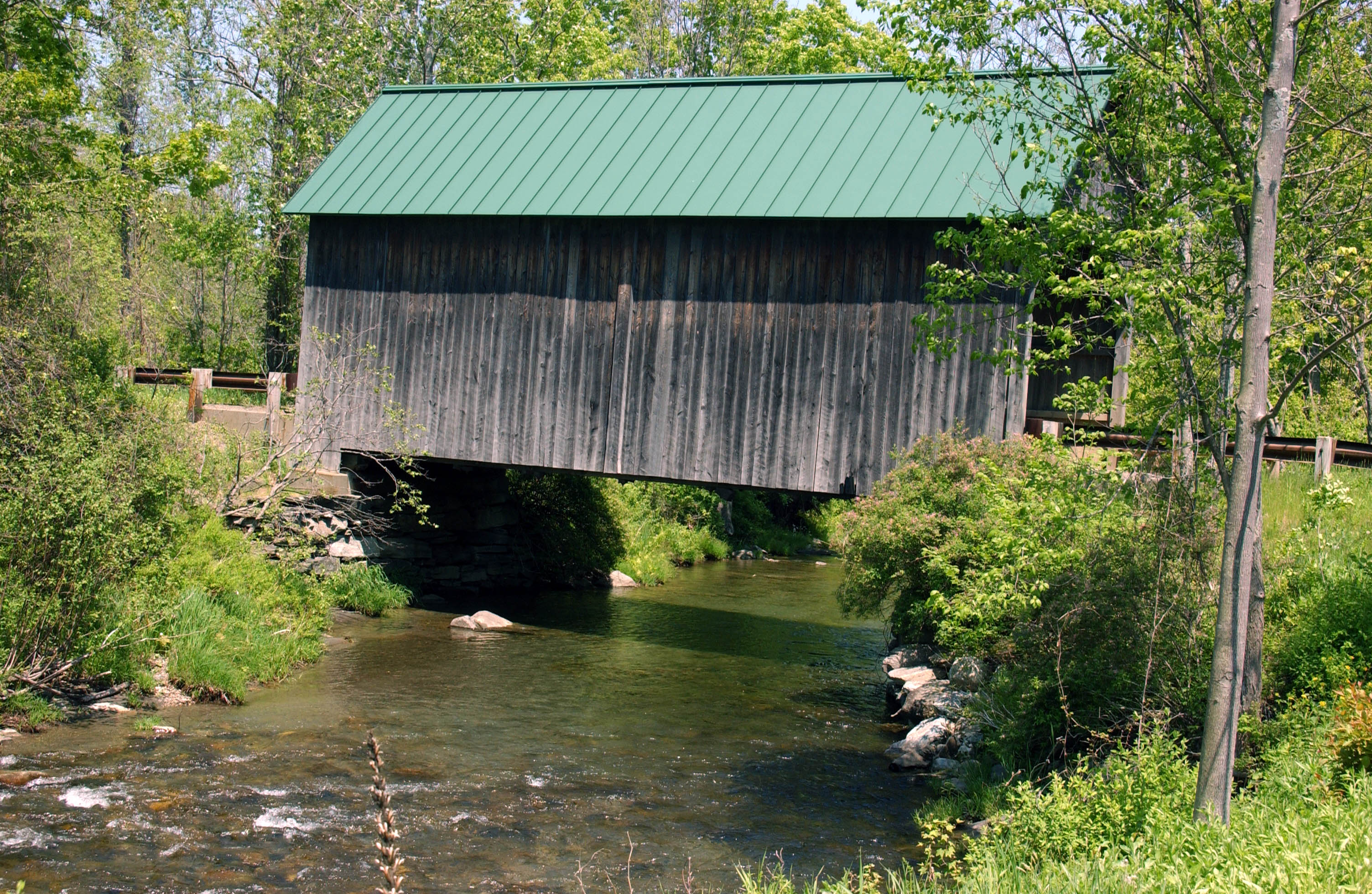
- The bridge in 2005

- Location within Vermont Location within the United States
- Location: Bible Hill Rd. over Mill Brook, West Windsor, Vermont
- Coordinates: 43°27′42″N 72°29′29″W
- Area: 1 acre (0.40 ha)
- Built by: unknown
- NRHP reference No.: 73000211
- Added to NRHP: August 28, 1973

The Bowers Covered Bridge (a.k.a. Brownsville Bridge) is a historic covered bridge, carrying Bible Hill Road across Mill Brook in the Brownsville section of West Windsor, Vermont. Built in 1919, it has a laminated-arch deck covered by a post-and-beam superstructure, similar to Best's Covered Bridge, Windsor's other historic covered bridge. It was listed on the National Register of Historic Places in 1973. It was rebuilt after being swept off its foundation in 2011 by Hurricane Irene, but has been damaged by vehicle strikes several times since then, and is being considered for closure.

== Description and history ==
The Bowers Covered Bridge is located in southern West Windsor, carrying Bible Hill Road across Mill Brook between Vermont Route 44 and Harrington and Westgate Roads. The bridge is 45 feet (14 m) long and 15 feet (4.6 m) wide, with a roadway width of 12.5 feet (3.8 m) (one lane). The bridge is a single span laminated arch structure resting on unmortared stone abutments, and covered by a post-and-beam shed. Its sides are finished in vertical board siding, and its roof is corrugated metal. Wooden floor stringers are supported by iron rods and wooden posts attached to the arches.

The bridge was built in 1919. It is one of two bridges in the town, and only one of three known in the state to use this type of laminated arch construction. The bridge was swept off its abutments by Hurricane Irene 2011, but rebuilt and reopened in 2012. It has since been struck several times by larger vehicles, resulting in structural damage. As of April 2016, the town is considering closing the bridge to traffic.

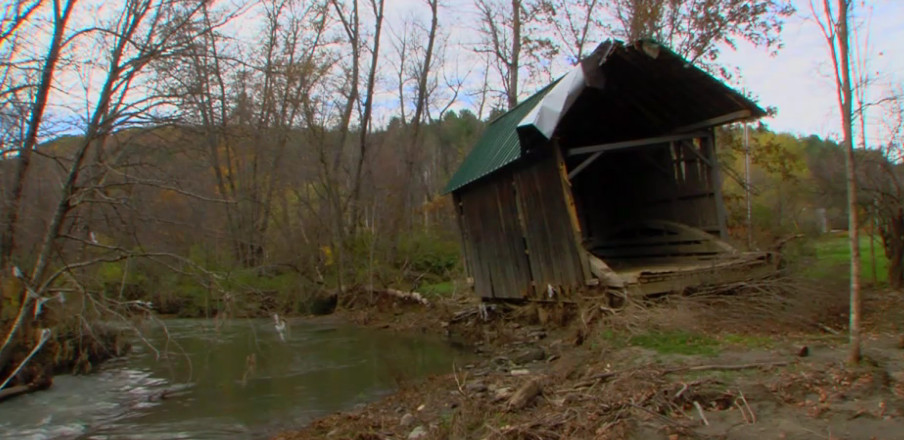
Damaged bridge on the riverbank after Hurricane Irene in 2011

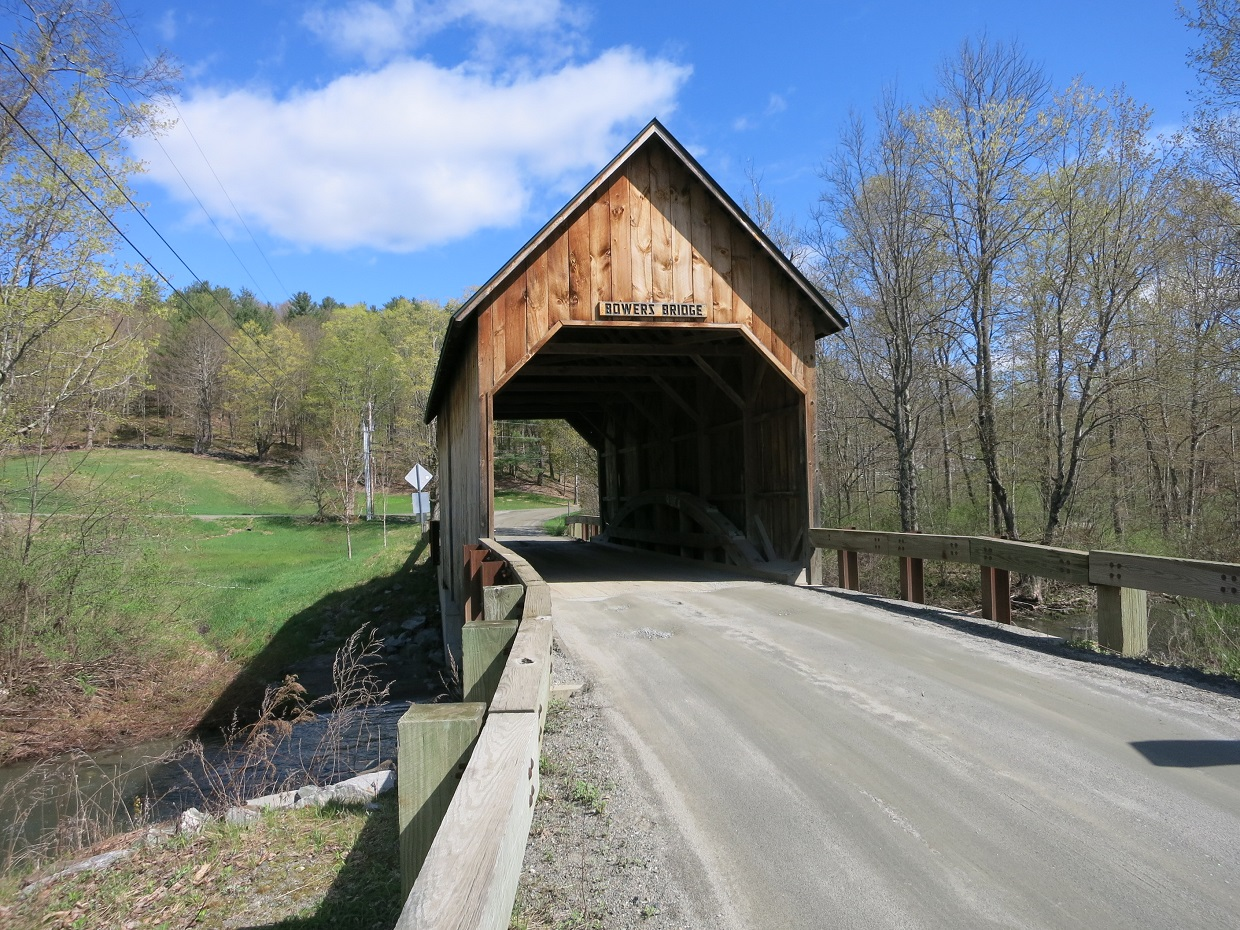
Bowers Covered Bridge looking north in May 2019

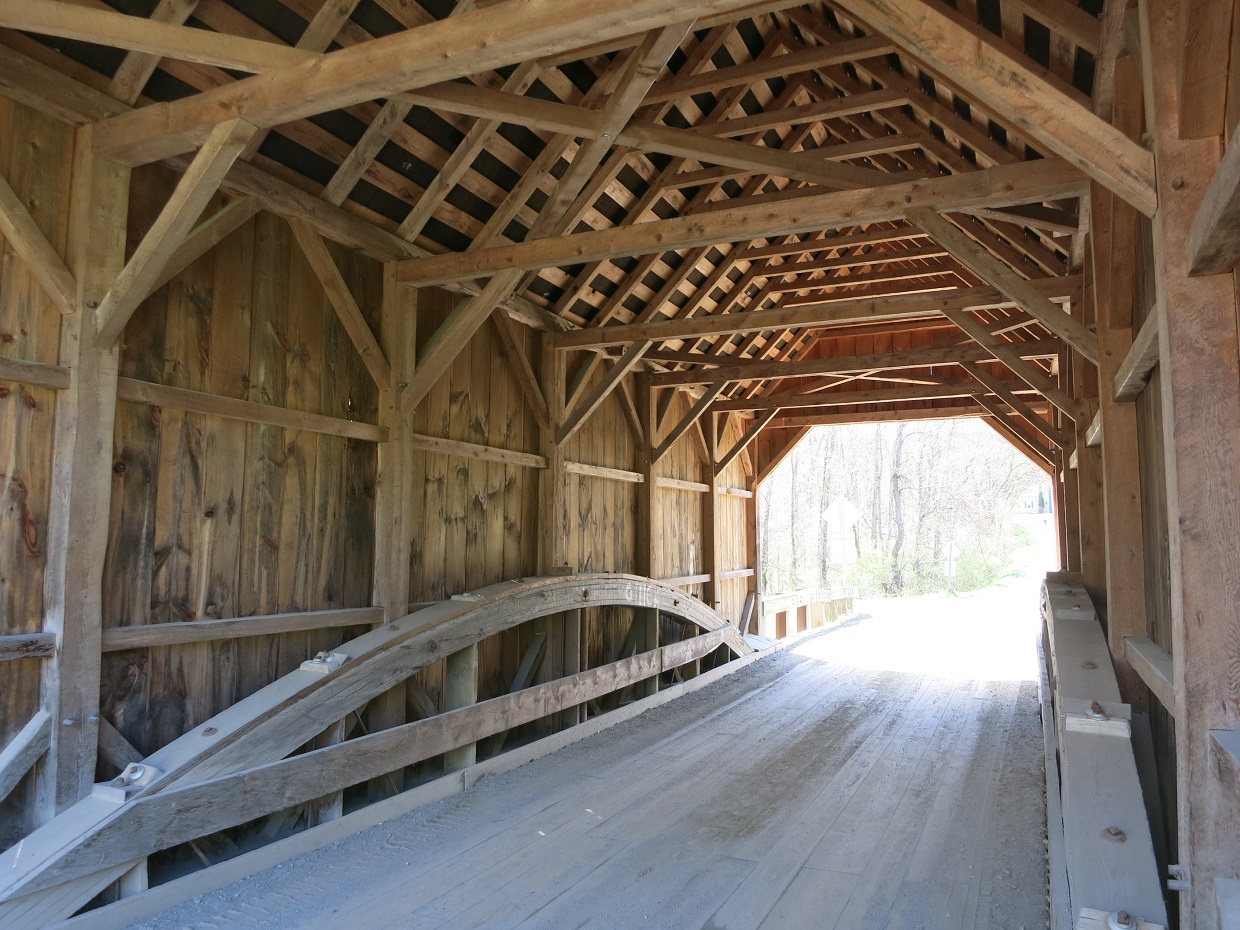
Bowers Covered Bridge showing construction details

== See also ==
- National Register of Historic Places listings in Windsor County, Vermont
- List of bridges on the National Register of Historic Places in Vermont
- List of Vermont covered bridges
- "Bowers Covered Bridge Restoration" (video via YouTube), Brownsville, Vermont, Mary 19, 2012
