= Isaac Reed House =

Historic house in New Hampshire, United States

- U.S. National Register of Historic Places
- U.S. Historic district – Contributing property
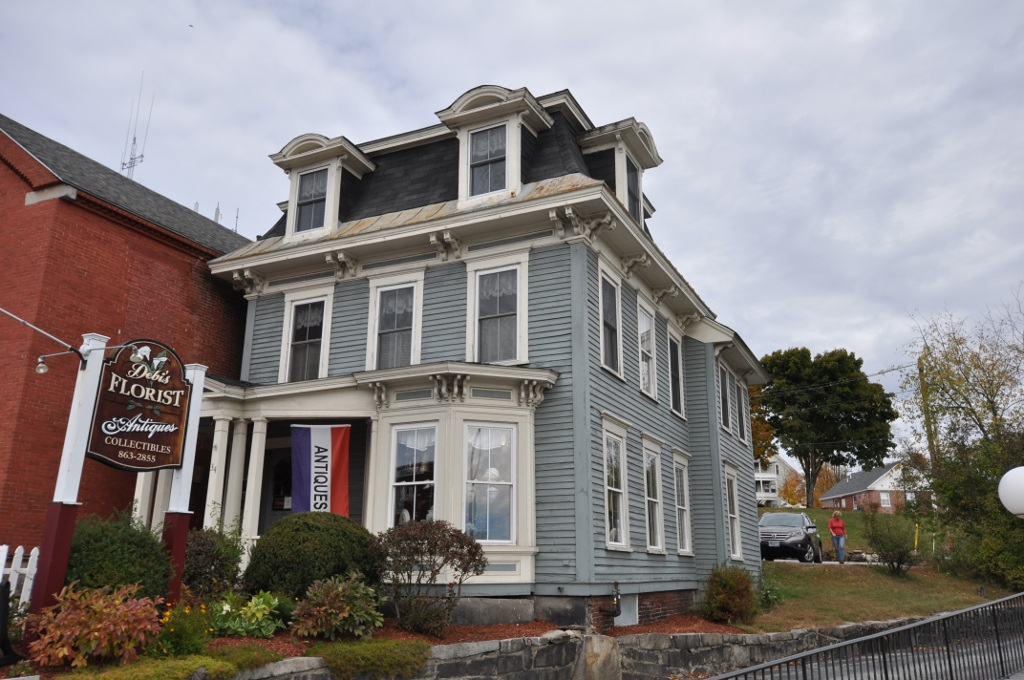

- Location within New Hampshire Location within the United States
- Location: 30-34 Main St., Newport, New Hampshire
- Coordinates: 43°21′51″N 72°10′21″W
- Area: 0.3 acres (0.12 ha)
- Built: 1869
- Architectural style: Second Empire
- Part of: Newport Downtown Historic District (ID85001201)
- NRHP reference No.: 78000337

Significant dates
- Added to NRHP: July 19, 1978
- Designated CP: June 6, 1985

The Isaac Reed House is a historic house at 30-34 Main Street in downtown Newport, New Hampshire. Built about 1869, it is a good local example of Second Empire architecture, and an important visual element of the surrounding commercial downtown and civic area. The house was listed on the National Register of Historic Places in 1985, and is a contributing property to the Newport Downtown Historic District.

== Description and history ==
The Isaac Reed House is located opposite Newport's row of 19th-century commercial blocks, on the east side of Main Street a short way south of the Newport Opera House. It is a 2 1/2-story wood-frame structure, with a clapboarded exterior. The house is Second Empire in style, with a mansard roof punctured by dormers with central segmented-arch roofs. The main facade is nominally three bays wide, although the first floor is divided in two, with a porticoed entry to the left and an ornately bracketed bay window to the right.

The house was built about 1869 by Dr. Isaac Reed, a local dentist, and is an important visual element of the municipal/county cluster of buildings which stand immediately adjacent. There were originally unsympathetic additions to the rear, which were built to make the building a multi-unit residence; these additions were removed in the 1970s, when the town decided not to raze the property. Its destruction had been contemplated as part of an urban renewal project, but was abandoned when the town decided instead to preserve and revitalize the area's historic buildings.

== See also ==
- National Register of Historic Places listings in Sullivan County, New Hampshire
