= Newport Downtown Historic District (New Hampshire) =

Historic district in New Hampshire, United States

- U.S. National Register of Historic Places
- U.S. Historic district
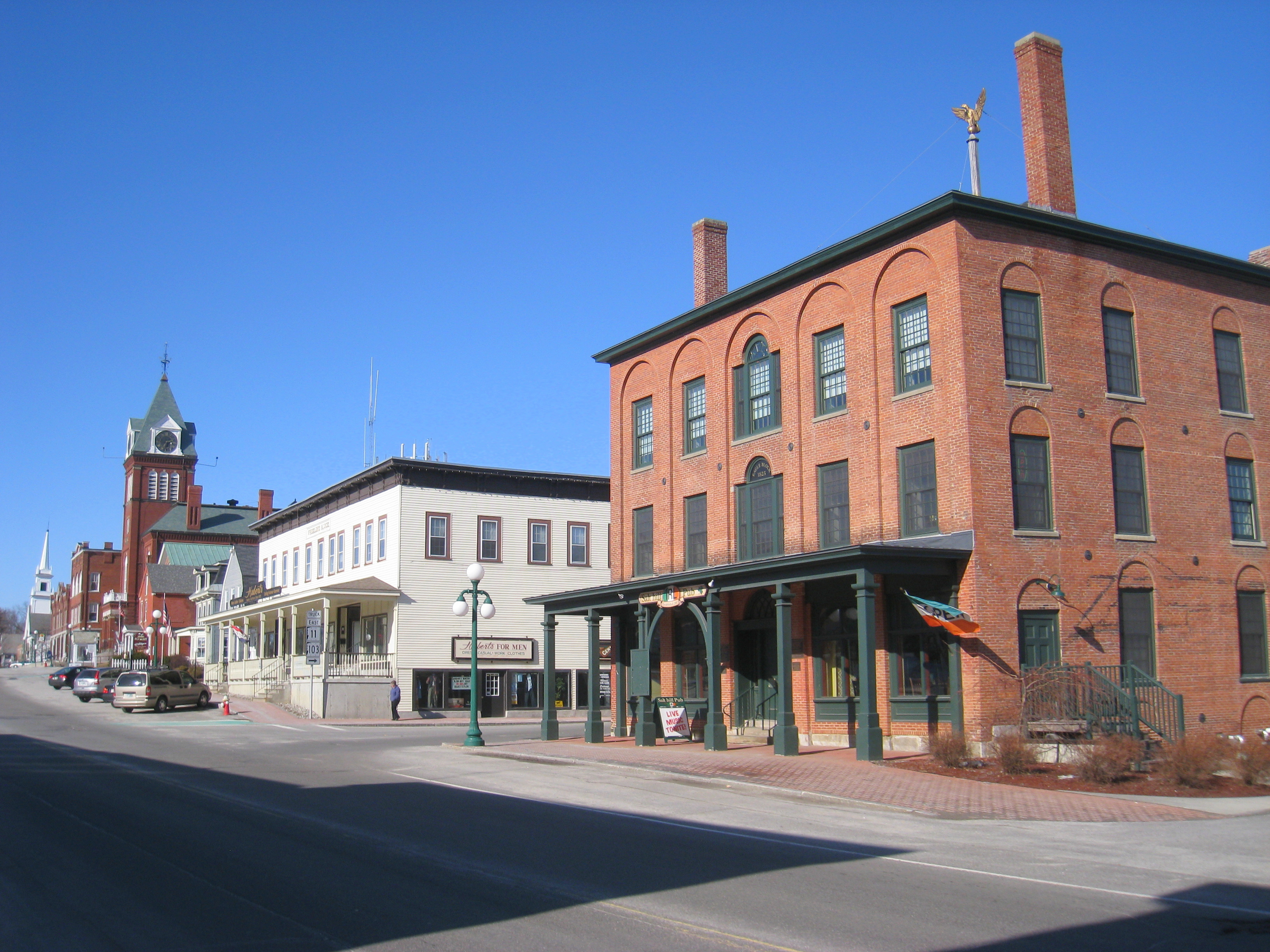
- Main Street view

- Location within New Hampshire Location within the United States
- Location: Main St. roughly bounded by Depot, Sunapee, Central and West Sts., Newport, New Hampshire
- Coordinates: 43°21′48″N 72°10′20″W
- Area: 6.5 acres (2.6 ha)
- Architect: Multiple
- Architectural style: Late 19th And 20th Century Revivals, Late Victorian, Federal
- NRHP reference No.: 85001201
- Added to NRHP: June 6, 1985

The Newport Downtown Historic District encompasses the 19th century heart of Newport, New Hampshire, the county seat of Sullivan County. The district includes the major commercial and civic (current and former) buildings which line Main Street between Depot Street and the Sugar River. The district was listed on the National Register of Historic Places in 1985.

Although Newport was settled in 1765, its current center began to take shape with the construction of the Croydon Turnpike, along what is now Main Street. The area was soon lined with services for travelers. The oldest commercial building in the district, the Eagle Block at 64 Main Street, was built in 1825-26; it is a three-story Federal-style brick building. The town gained in importance when Sullivan County was set off from Cheshire County in 1826, resulting in the construction of the records office, jail, and the first courthouse, all brick Federal-style buildings. on the east side of Main Street. The courthouse (now used for other purposes) stands on a hill set well back from Main Street.

The west side of Main Street became the locus for commercial development, and now sports a series of buildings mostly built before 1930, anchored at one end by a modern state liquor store, and at the other end by a c. 1930 Worcester Lunch Car Company diner, which formerly abutted the Eagle Block. It was relocated to Savannah, Georgia, around 1990. The dominant feature of the east side is now the Newport Opera House building, which was designed by Hira R. Beckwith to serve as the courthouse and town hall, and replaced an 1872 building destroyed by a major fire. This building is now used mainly as a performing venue; the municipal offices are now located just outside the district on Sunapee Street. Also notable on the east side is the Isaac Reed House, one of the last private residences built in the area, and a particularly fine example of Italianate and Second Empire styling.

== See also ==
- National Register of Historic Places listings in Sullivan County, New Hampshire
