= Old Sullivan County Courthouse =

- Sullivan County Courthouse
- U.S. National Register of Historic Places
- U.S. Historic district – Contributing property
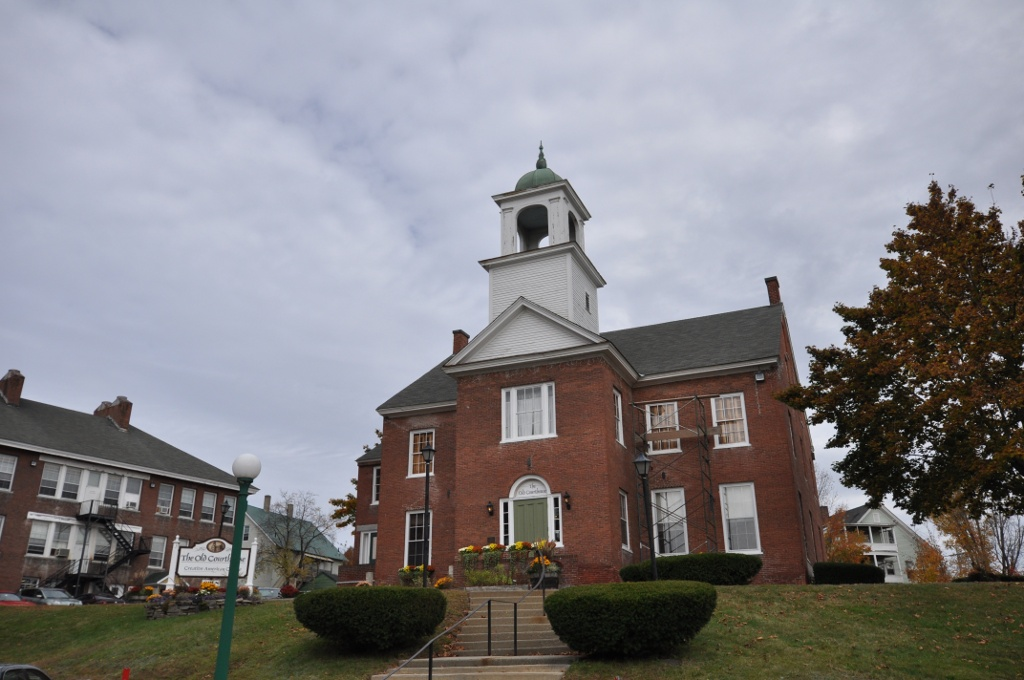

- Location within New Hampshire Location within the United States
- Interactive map showing the location of Old Sullivan County Courthouse
- Location: Court Sq., Newport, New Hampshire
- Coordinates: 43°21′52″N 72°10′21″W
- Area: 0.6 acres (0.24 ha)
- Built: 1825
- Architectural style: Federal
- Part of: Newport Downtown Historic District (ID85001201)
- NRHP reference No.: 73000178

Significant dates
- Added to NRHP: June 25, 1973
- Designated CP: June 6, 1985

The Old Sullivan County Courthouse was the first county courthouse of Sullivan County, New Hampshire. Construction of the brick building in 1825-26 was instrumental in securing Newport's status as the shire town of the county when it was established in 1827. The building was listed on the National Register of Historic Places (as "Sullivan County Courthouse") in 1985. The building is now in commercial use.

== Description and history ==
The Old Sullivan County Courthouse is located in downtown Newport, on a rise east of Main Street, behind later civic buildings and across Main Street from a cluster of later 19th-century commercial blocks. Its main block is a 2 1/2-story brick structure, with a gabled roof and end chimneys. It has a five-bay front facade, with the center bay taken up by an entry topped by a tower. The entry is two stories, with the main entrance framed by sidelight windows and a half-round transom window. The tower is a wood-frame structure with a blank square stage at its base, followed by an open belfry with arched openings, and topped by a cupola. A brick two-story wing extends to the northeast of the main block.

The courthouse was built in 1825-26 (prior to the establishment of Sullivan County, which occurred in 1827) with funding from the town, and was instrumental in the choice of Newport as the new county's seat. The building served as a county court and town hall until 1873, when it was turned over to the town. It was used by the town as a school until 1896, when it was leased to the local Grange chapter.

== See also ==
- Newport Opera House, also used as a county courthouse
