= Guild, New Hampshire =

Unincorporated community in New Hampshire, United States

- Unincorporated community
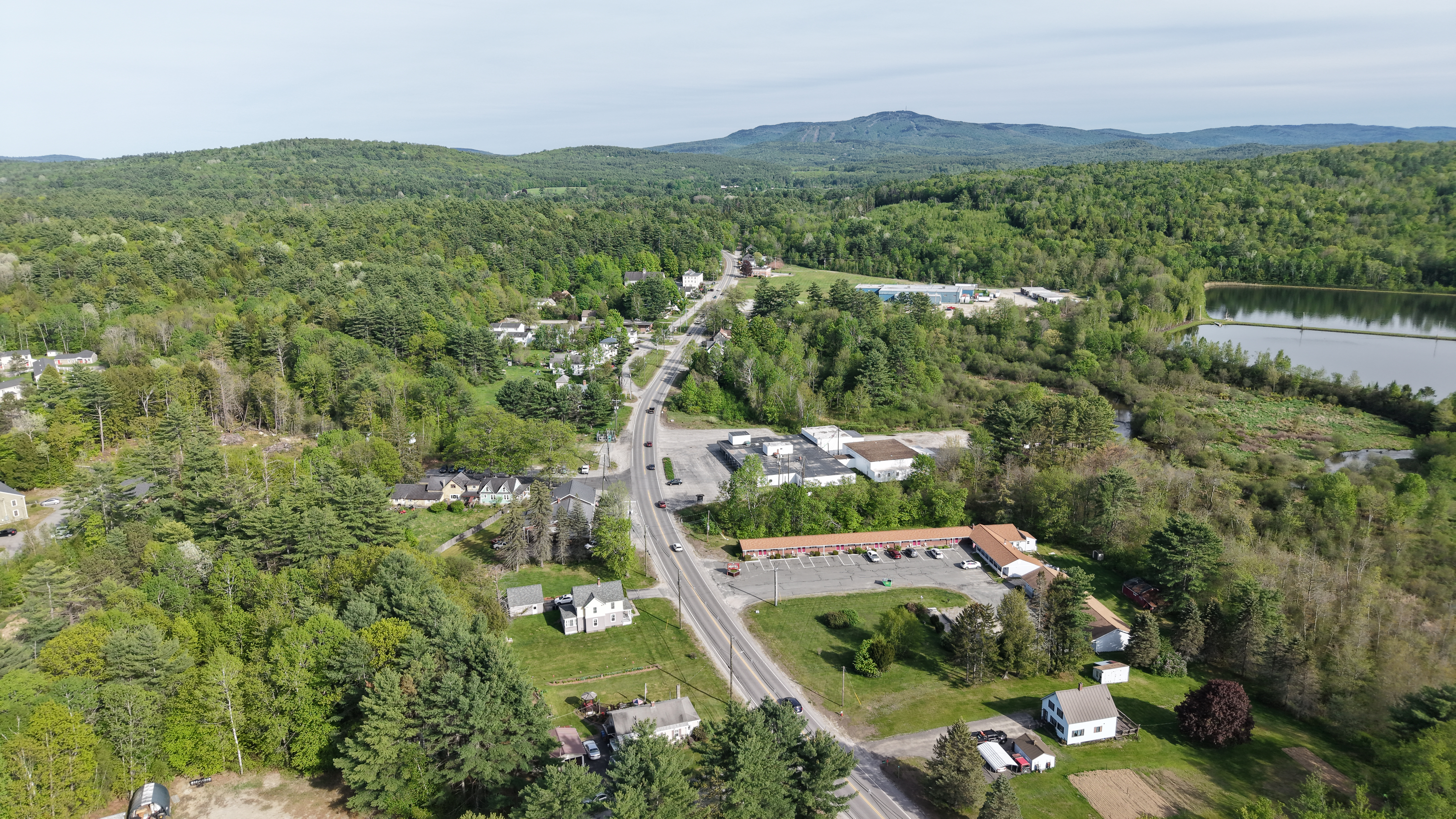
- Guild from the northwest

- Location within New Hampshire Location within the United States
- Coordinates: 43°22′36″N 72°08′17″W
- Country: United States
- State: New Hampshire
- County: Sullivan
- Town: Newport
- Elevation: 860 ft (260 m)
- Time zone: UTC-5 (Eastern (EST))
  - Summer (DST): UTC-4 (EDT)
- ZIP code: 03754
- Area code: 603
- GNIS feature ID: 867270

Guild (pronounced /ˈɡaɪld/) is an unincorporated community in the town of Newport in Sullivan County, New Hampshire, United States. It is located near the eastern boundary of Newport, along New Hampshire Routes 11 and 103. Route 11 proceeds east to Sunapee and New London, while Route 103 travels southeast to Newbury, Bradford, and Warner. Both routes travel west to the center of Newport and on to Claremont. The village is located along the Sugar River.

Guild has a separate ZIP code (03754) from the rest of the town of Newport.

== Notable person ==
- Sarah Josepha Hale, author ("Mary Had a Little Lamb"); proponent of a national Thanksgiving holiday
