= Stocker Brook =

- Location within New Hampshire Location within the United States

Location
- Country: United States
- State: New Hampshire
- County: Sullivan
- Towns: Croydon, Springfield, Grantham

Physical characteristics
- Source: Cranberry Pond
  - location: Croydon
  - coordinates: 43°27′39″N 72°6′50″W
  - elevation: 1,093 ft (333 m)
- Mouth: North Branch Sugar River
  - location: Grantham
  - coordinates: 43°29′25″N 72°8′8″W
  - elevation: 955 ft (291 m)
- Length: 2.9 mi (4.7 km)

Basin features
- Tributaries
  - right: Bog Brook

Stocker Brook is a 2.9-mile-long (4.7 km) stream located in western New Hampshire in the United States. It is a tributary of the North Branch of the Sugar River, part of the Connecticut River and Long Island Sound drainage basin.

The brook begins at Cranberry Pond in the town of Croydon, New Hampshire, and flows north, through Stocker Pond, to a junction with Bog Brook in the town of Grantham. The brook turns west, passes the small village of East Grantham, and reaches the North Branch of the Sugar River after another mile, at the main village of Grantham. Stocker Brook is subject to the New Hampshire Comprehensive Shoreland Protection Act for the portion downstream of Bog Brook.

== See also ==
- List of rivers of New Hampshire
