= Goshen, New Hampshire =

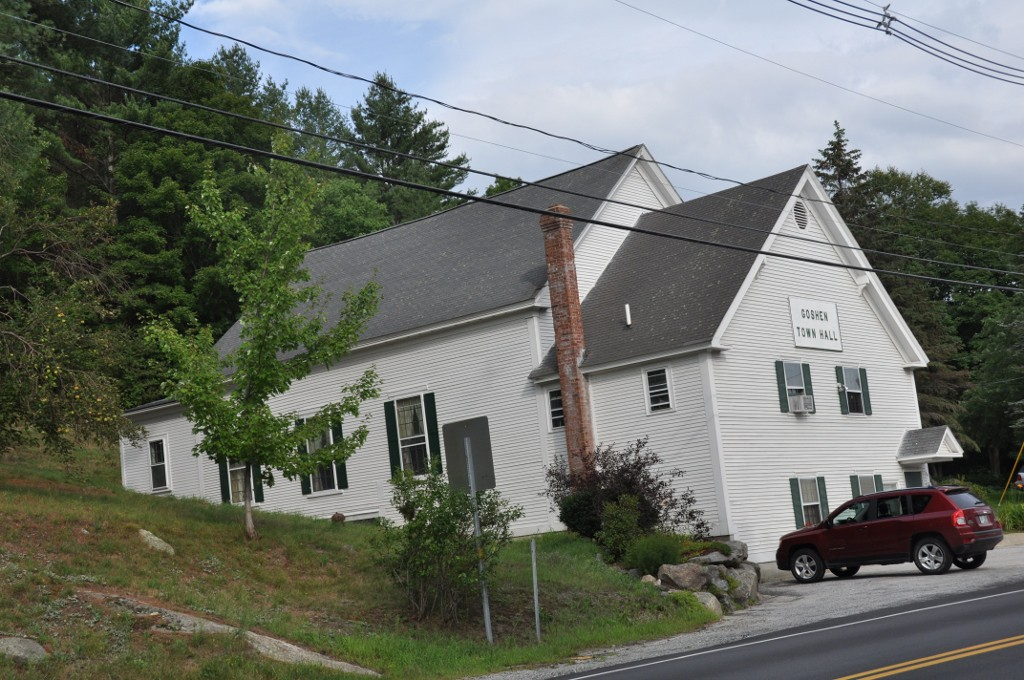
- Town Hall

- Seal

- Location in Sullivan County and the state of New Hampshire
- Coordinates: 43°17′21″N 72°06′55″W
- Country: United States
- State: New Hampshire
- County: Sullivan
- Incorporated: 1791
- Villages: Goshen; Goshen Four Corners

Area
  - Total: 22.53 sq mi (58.36 km^{2})
  - Land: 22.44 sq mi (58.12 km^{2})
  - Water: 0.093 sq mi (0.24 km^{2}) 0.41%
- Elevation: 1,286 ft (392 m)

Population (2020)
  - Total: 796
  - Density: 35/sq mi (13.7/km^{2})
- Time zone: UTC-5 (Eastern)
  - Summer (DST): UTC-4 (Eastern)
- ZIP code: 03752
- Area code: 603
- FIPS code: 33-30500
- GNIS feature ID: 873608
- Website: www.goshennh.org

Goshen is a town in Sullivan County, New Hampshire, United States. The population was 796 at the 2020 census.

== History ==
Incorporated in 1791, Goshen was first settled in 1768 as a part of Saville (now Sunapee). The name "Goshen" may have been taken from Goshen, Connecticut, where many residents had relatives.

== Geography ==
According to the United States Census Bureau, the town has a total area of 22.5 square miles (58.4 km^{2}), of which 22.4 square miles (58.1 km^{2}) are land and 0.1 square miles (0.2 km^{2}) are water, comprising 0.41% of the town. Goshen is drained by the South Branch Sugar River and its tributaries Blood Brook and Gunnison Brook, and hence lies almost fully within the Connecticut River watershed. Most of the southeastern part of town is drained by Cherry Brook, one of the headwaters of the Ashuelot River, a southwestward-flowing tributary of the Connecticut, but a small area at the southeastern corner of town has the headwaters of the eastward-flowing West Branch Warner River, part of the Merrimack River watershed.

The long ridge of Mount Sunapee occupies the eastern edge of town. The highest point in Goshen is an unnamed knob on the ridge (near Goves Mountain) where the elevation reaches 2,529 feet (771 m) above sea level.

New Hampshire Route 10 passes through the western part of the town, including Goshen village, and leads north to Newport and south to Keene. New Hampshire Route 31 has its northern terminus at Route 10 and leads southeast to Hillsborough.

=== Adjacent municipalities ===
- Sunapee (north)
- Newbury (east)
- Bradford (southeast at one point)
- Washington (south)
- Lempster (southwest)
- Unity (west)
- Newport (northwest)

== Demographics ==
Historical population
Census	Pop.	Note	%±
1800	383		—
1810	563		47.0%
1820	687		22.0%
1830	772		12.4%
1840	779		0.9%
1850	659		−15.4%
1860	576		−12.6%
1870	507		−12.0%
1880	511		0.8%
1890	384		−24.9%
1900	345		−10.2%
1910	329		−4.6%
1920	283		−14.0%
1930	255		−9.9%
1940	352		38.0%
1950	356		1.1%
1960	351		−1.4%
1970	395		12.5%
1980	549		39.0%
1990	742		35.2%
2000	741		−0.1%
2010	810		9.3%
2020	796		−1.7%
U.S. Decennial Census

As of the census of 2000, there were 741 people, 279 households, and 219 families residing in the town. The population density was 32.9 inhabitants per square mile (12.7/km^{2}). There were 389 housing units at an average density of 17.3 per square mile (6.7/km^{2}). The racial makeup of the town was 97.03% White, 1.62% Native American, 0.13% Asian, 0.13% from other races, and 1.08% from two or more races. Hispanic or Latino of any race were 0.40% of the population.

There were 279 households, out of which 33.3% had children under the age of 18 living with them, 64.5% were married couples living together, 9.7% had a female householder with no husband present, and 21.5% were non-families. 17.2% of all households were made up of individuals, and 7.2% had someone living alone who was 65 years of age or older. The average household size was 2.63 and the average family size was 2.96.

In the town, the population was spread out, with 24.2% under the age of 18, 8.0% from 18 to 24, 27.5% from 25 to 44, 26.7% from 45 to 64, and 13.6% who were 65 years of age or older. The median age was 40 years. For every 100 females, there were 97.6 males. For every 100 females age 18 and over, there were 96.5 males.

The median income for a household in the town was $42,625, and the median income for a family was $45,208. Males had a median income of $33,333 versus $22,727 for females. The per capita income for the town was $20,561. About 6.9% of families and 8.8% of the population were below the poverty line, including 10.8% of those under age 18 and 21.5% of those age 65 or over.

== Education ==
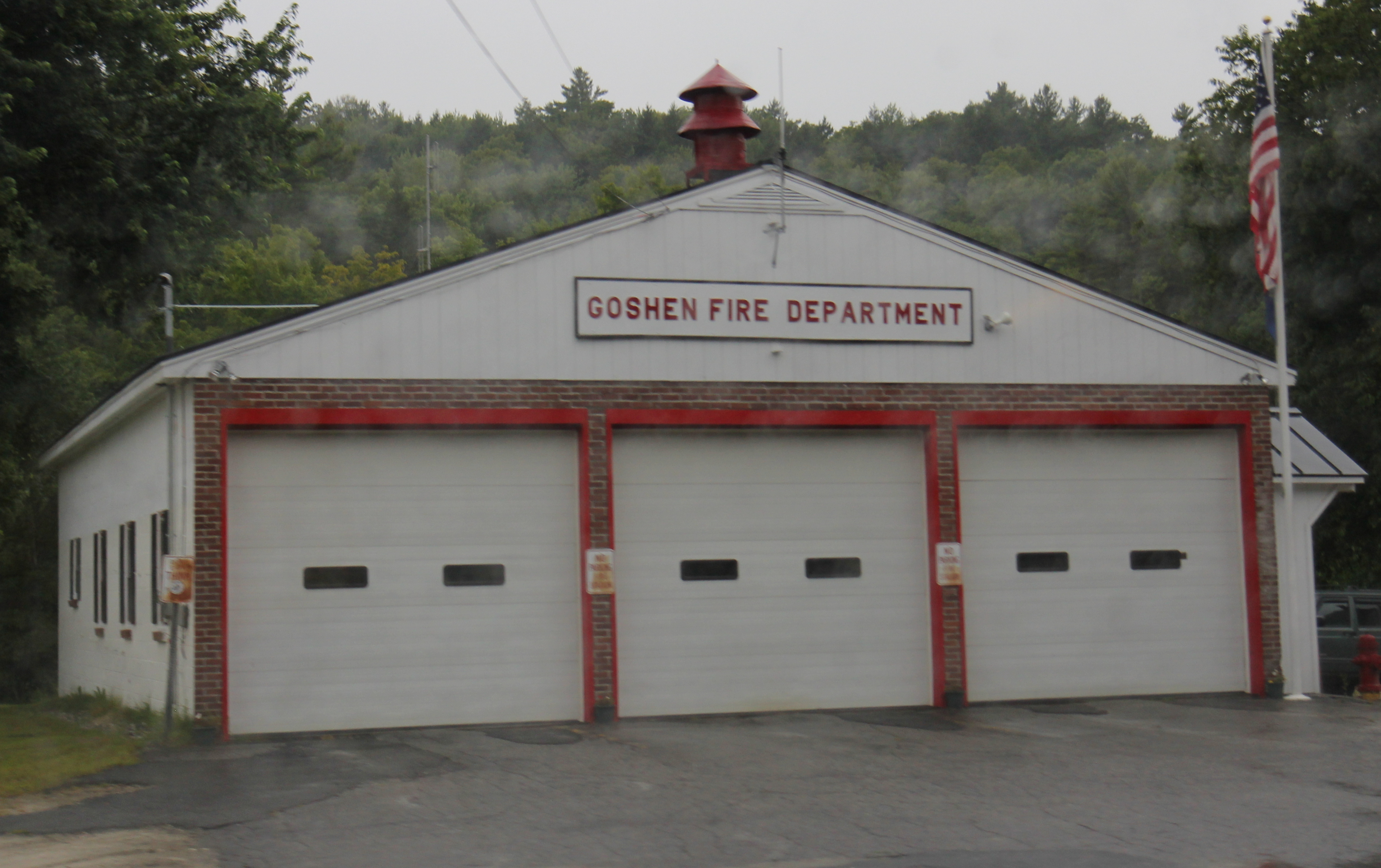
Fire station in Goshen

Starting in 1954, Goshen and the neighboring town of Lempster maintained a combined elementary and middle school, called Goshen-Lempster Cooperative School, located in Lempster. The school served kindergarten through eighth grade. The cooperative between the two towns was dissolved in June 2016 due to a dispute over costs and taxes, with the school subsequently being renamed Lempster Community School. The Newport, NH school district now is the anchor system for the majority of Goshen elementary and middle-school aged children.

After eighth grade, students are given the choice of attending several neighboring high schools, including Newport High School, Sunapee Middle-High School, and Kearsarge Regional High School.

== Notable person ==
- John Williams Gunnison (1812–1853), US Army officer, explorer of the American West
