= South Branch Sugar River =

River in the United States of America

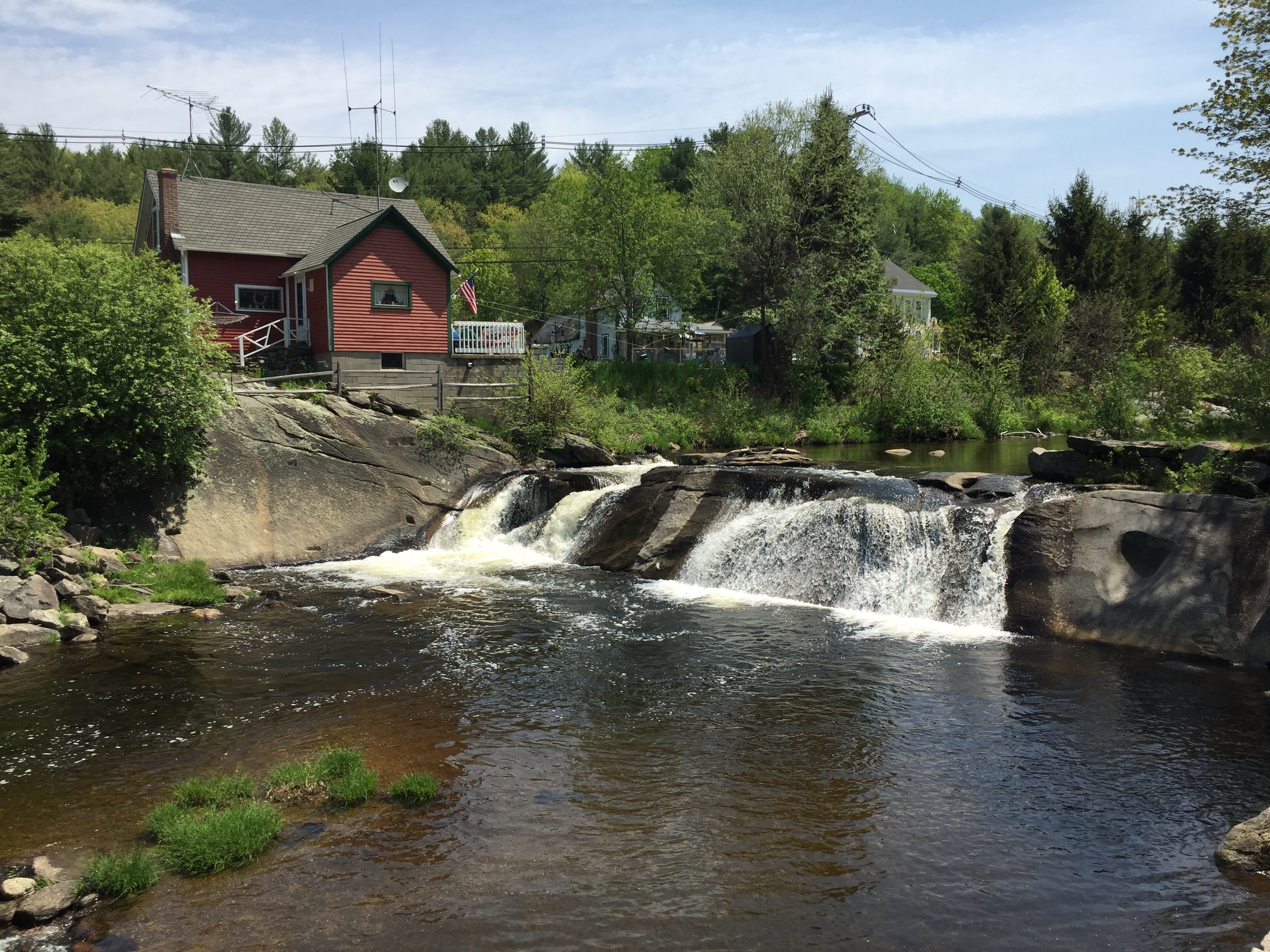
- The South Branch at Lear Hill Road in Goshen, NH

- Location within New Hampshire Location within the United States

Location
- Country: United States
- State: New Hampshire
- County: Sullivan
- Towns: Goshen, Newport

Physical characteristics
- Source: Confluence of Blood Brook and Gunnison Brook
  - location: Goshen
  - coordinates: 43°18′4″N 72°9′1″W
  - elevation: 955 ft (291 m)
- Mouth: Sugar River
  - location: Newport
  - coordinates: 43°21′43″N 72°10′27″W
  - elevation: 781 ft (238 m)
- Length: 6.6 mi (10.6 km)

Basin features
- Tributaries
  - left: Coon Brook, Spring Brook

The South Branch of the Sugar River is a 6.6-mile-long (10.6 km) river located in western New Hampshire in the United States. It is a tributary of the Sugar River, which flows to the Connecticut River, which flows to Long Island Sound.

The South Branch begins at the confluence of Gunnison Brook and Blood Brook at the center of the town of Goshen, New Hampshire. The river flows north, reaching the Sugar River near the center of the town of Newport. New Hampshire Route 10 follows the South Branch for its entire length.

== See also ==
- List of rivers of New Hampshire
