= Henry Harrison Metcalf =

American journalist

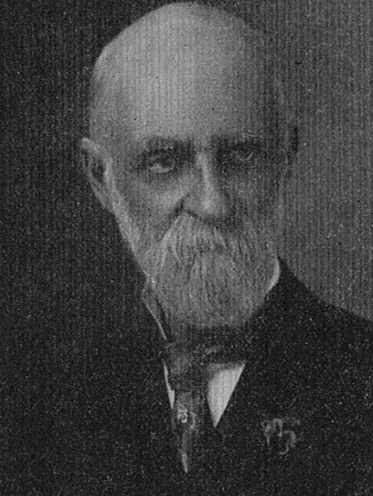
- Born: April 7, 1841; Newport, New Hampshire
- Died: February 5, 1932 (aged 90); Concord, New Hampshire
- Occupations: Journalist, historian
- Political party: Democrat
- Spouse: Mary Jane Jackson Metcalf
- Children: Harry Bingham Metcalf, Laura Prucia Metcalf Pearson, Edmund Birk Metcalf
- Parent(s): Joseph Park Metcalf, Lucy Gould Metcalf

Henry Harrison Metcalf, LL.D., (April 7, 1841 – February 5, 1932) was an editor, journalist, historian, politician, and author from New Hampshire.

== Biography ==
Henry Metcalf was born in Newport, New Hampshire, to Joseph and Lucy Metcalf on April 7, 1841. He studied law at the University of Michigan Law School, graduating in 1865 and being admitted to the state bar in 1866. However, he choose to enter the field of journalism instead of law and edited multiple newspapers and magazines over his career, including The Granite Monthly which he founded in 1877. Metcalf married Mary Jackson on December 18, 1869, in Littleton, New Hampshire.

Metcalf's literary career included editing the White Mountain Republic, The Manchester Daily Union, and The New Hampshire Patriot. He also wrote for the New York World, the New York Herald, The New York Times, The Boston Post, and others. He also wrote and edited a number of books, mostly on history relating to New Hampshire. He served as New Hampshire's State Historian as well as historian of the state society of the Sons of the American Revolution, in addition to serving as the society's president in 1918.

Metcalf was involved in New Hampshire state politics as a Democrat, and held multiple offices, becoming a leader in the state party and directing the state convention in 1900 as well as serving as a party delegate. He was also a supporter of the woman's suffrage movement. At the World Suffrage Association meeting in 1914 he was elected a vice president representing New Hampshire. He was also active in the Universalist church, serving as superintendent of the Sunday school, vice president of the New Hampshire Universalist state convention, and a member of its board of trustees. He received an honorary degree from Dartmouth College in 1913.

Metcalf died of pneumonia in Concord on February 5, 1932, at the age of 90. He was sometimes known as New Hampshire's "Grand Old Man" and was honored by multiple political, civic, and religious organizations in the state upon his death.

== Partial bibliography ==
- The National Grange, Patrons of Husbandry, at Concord, New Hampshire, November 18–24, 1892. 1893.
- New Hampshire women: A collection of portraits and biographical sketches of daughters and residents of the Granite state. 1895
- New Hampshire agriculture : personal and farm sketches. 1897
- Laws of New Hampshire, including public and private acts and resolves and the Royal commissions and instructions, with historical and descriptive notes. 1904
- Probate records of the province of New Hampshire ... 1635-[1771]. 1907
- Memorial of Hon. Harry Bingham, LL. D., lawyer, legislator, author. 1910
- Dedication of a statue of General Franklin Pierce, fourteenth President of the United States, at the State house, Concord, November 25, 1914. 1914.
- One thousand New Hampshire notables. 1919.
- New Hampshire in History, or, The Contribution of the Granite State to the Development of the Nation. 1921.
- New Hampshire Sesqui-centennial celebration. One hundred and fiftieth anniversary of the establishment of independent government. 1926.
- Sullivan County recollections. 1926
- Franklin Pierce and Edmund Burke: a President and a president-maker. 1930
