= Newport (CDP), New Hampshire =

Census-designated place in New Hampshire, United States

Newport, New Hampshire
- Census-designated place
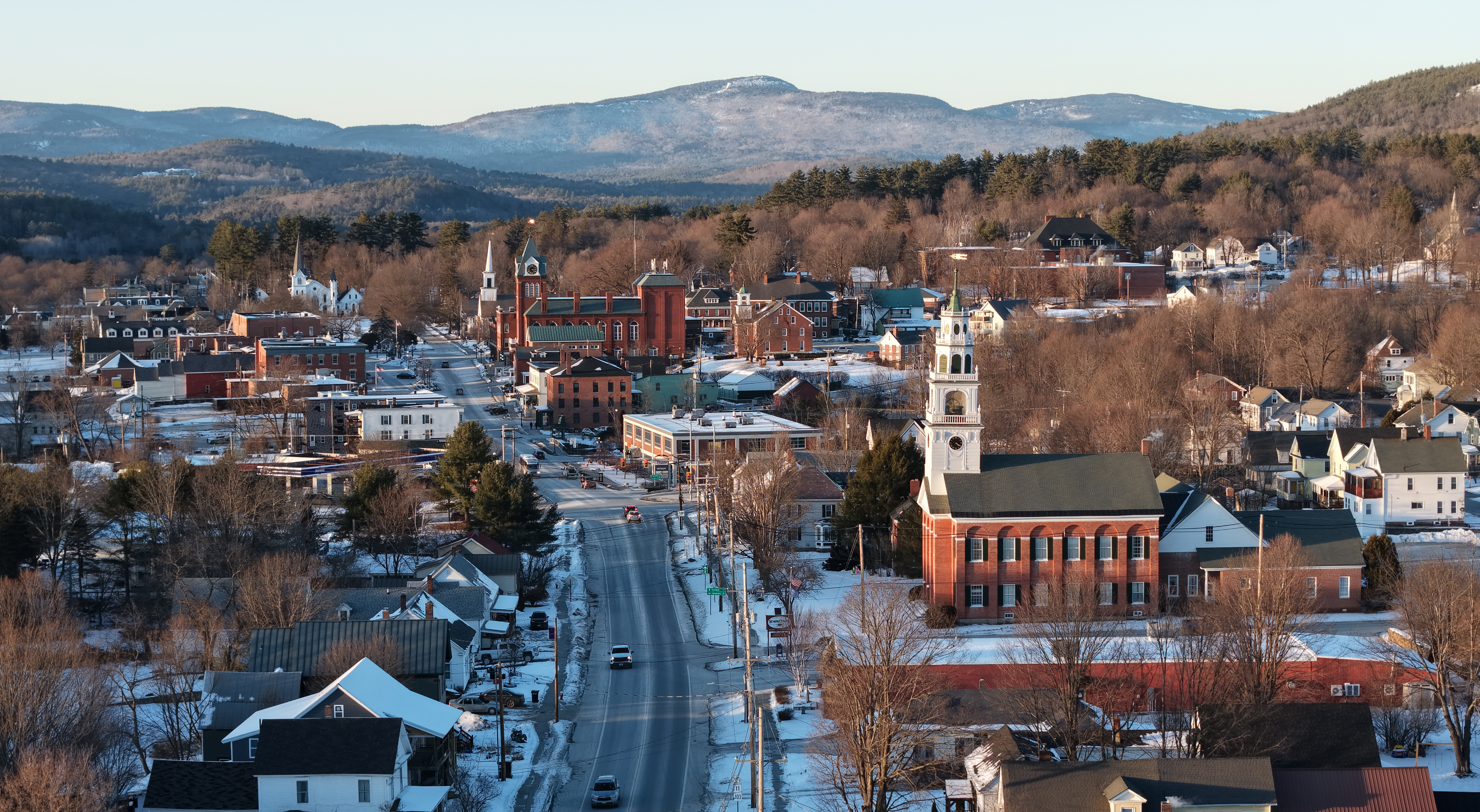
- Newport, New Hampshire, from the south

- Location within New Hampshire Location within the United States
- Coordinates: 43°21′54″N 72°10′36″W
- Country: United States
- State: New Hampshire
- County: Sullivan
- Town: Newport

Area
  - Total: 14.11 sq mi (36.54 km^{2})
  - Land: 14.11 sq mi (36.54 km^{2})
  - Water: 0 sq mi (0.00 km^{2})
- Elevation: 797 ft (243 m)

Population (2020)
  - Total: 4,735
  - Density: 335.6/sq mi (129.59/km^{2})
- Time zone: UTC-5 (Eastern (EST))
  - Summer (DST): UTC-4 (EDT)
- ZIP code: 03773
- Area code: 603
- FIPS code: 33-52500
- GNIS feature ID: 2378084

Newport is a census-designated place (CDP) comprising the main village and surrounding rural land in the town of Newport, New Hampshire, United States. The population of the CDP was 4,735 at the 2020 census, out of 6,299 in the entire town.

== Geography ==
The CDP is in the eastern part of the town of Newport, with the village of Newport in the center of the CDP at the junction of the Sugar River with its South Branch. The CDP extends north to the Croydon town line, east to the Sunapee line, and south to the Unity line. From the Croydon line, the CDP border follows the North Branch of the Sugar River and then the main stem of the Sugar River southwest to New Hampshire Routes 11 and 103 in Kellyville. The border then follows NH 11/103, Whitcher Road, Bascom Road, and Unity Road to the Unity town line. A short distance to the east the CDP border follows Spring Brook east to the South Branch of the Sugar River, then turns south up the South Branch to Coon Brook Road and New Hampshire Route 10, which it follows north to Page Hill Road. It follows an unnamed stream north to Blaisdell Road, then follows East Mountain Road, Schoolhouse Road, and Bradford Road east to the Sunapee town line. The CDP runs north along the town line to Maple Street south of Wendell, then turns west on an abandoned railroad line and a power line to the Sugar River at the east edge of the urban center of Newport. Turning back to the east, the border follows the river upstream to Long Pond Brook, where it turns north, follows Routes 11/103 briefly, then takes Sand Hill Road north back to the Croydon line.

New Hampshire Route 10 is Newport's Main Street, leading north 10 miles (16 km) to Interstate 89 in Grantham and south 35 miles (56 km) to Keene. Routes 11/103 lead west together 9 miles (14 km) to Claremont. The two highways lead east out of town as Sunapee Street, splitting 3 miles (5 km) east of the center of Newport in the village of Wendell. Route 11 leads northeast 5.5 miles (8.9 km) from Newport to Sunapee village, while Route 103 leads southeast 9.5 miles (15.3 km) to Newbury Harbor on Lake Sunapee.

According to the U.S. Census Bureau, the Newport CDP has a total area of 14.1 square miles (36.5 km^{2}), all of it recorded as land.

== Demographics ==
Historical population
Census	Pop.	Note	%±
1950	3,062		—
1960	3,222		5.2%
1970	3,296		2.3%
1980	4,388		33.1%
1990	3,772		−14.0%
2000	4,008		6.3%
2010	4,769		19.0%
2020	4,735		−0.7%
U.S. Decennial Census

As of the census of 2010, there were 4,769 people, 1,954 households, and 1,221 families residing in the CDP. There were 2,184 housing units, of which 230, or 10.5%, were vacant. The racial makeup of the CDP was 96.9% white, 0.3% African American, 0.3% Native American, 0.5% Asian, 0.0% Pacific Islander, 0.2% some other race, and 1.8% from two or more races. 1.1% of the population were Hispanic or Latino of any race.

Of the 1,954 households in the CDP, 30.2% had children under the age of 18 living with them, 44.1% were headed by married couples living together, 12.5% had a female householder with no husband present, and 37.5% were non-families. 29.9% of all households were made up of individuals, and 15.1% were someone living alone who was 65 years of age or older. The average household size was 2.38, and the average family size was 2.90.

22.6% of residents in the CDP were under the age of 18, 8.6% were from age 18 to 24, 23.4% were from 25 to 44, 27.9% were from 45 to 64, and 17.4% were 65 years of age or older. The median age was 41.5 years. For every 100 females, there were 91.0 males. For every 100 females age 18 and over, there were 86.9 males.

For the period 2011–15, the estimated median annual income for a household was $49,486, and the median income for a family was $62,163. The per capita income for the CDP was $24,406. 8.4% of the population and 2.7% of families were below the poverty line, along with 1.3% of people under the age of 18 and 14.1% of people 65 or older.
