= North Branch Sugar River =

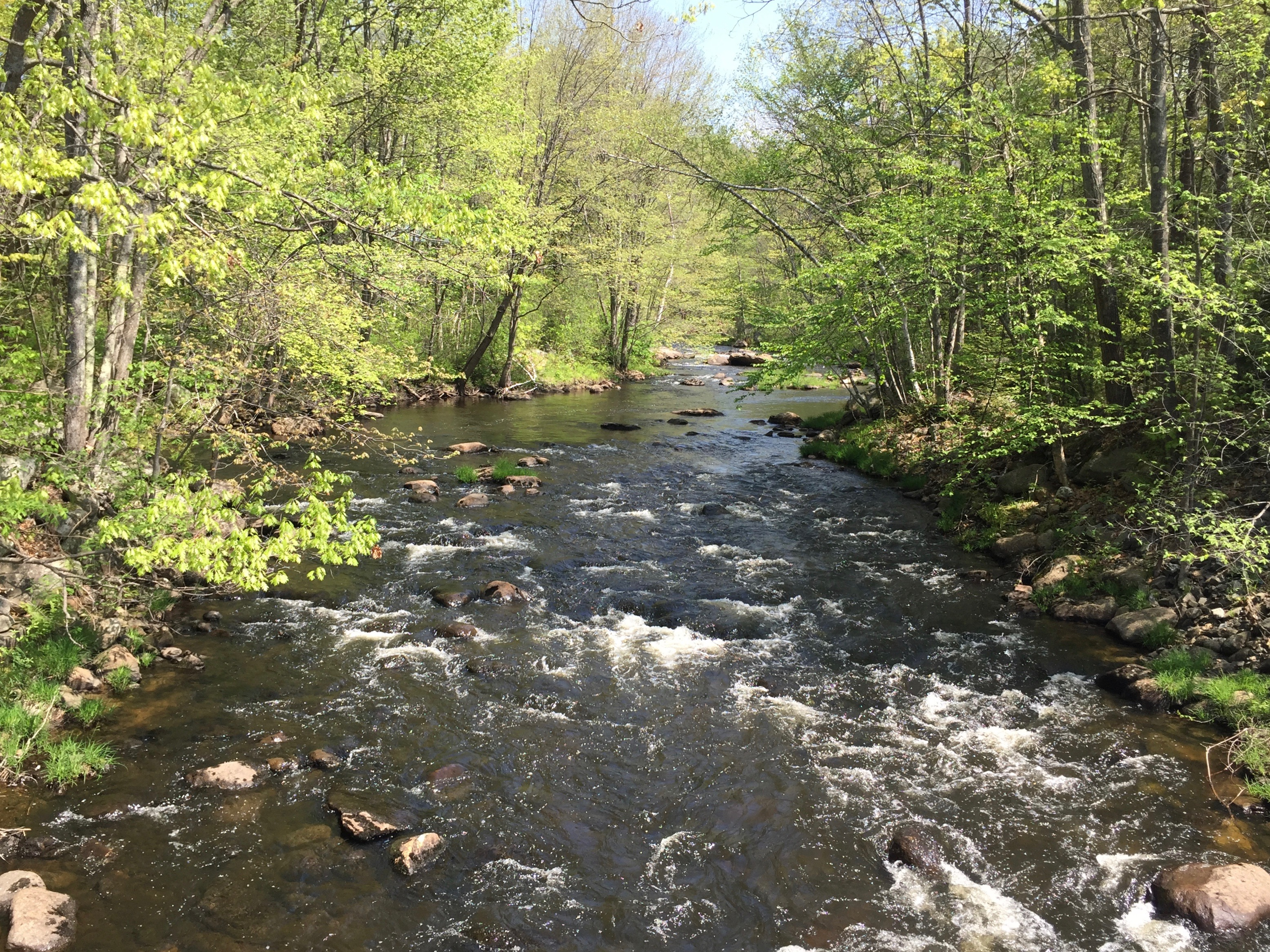
- The North Branch at Croydon, NH

- Location within New Hampshire Location within the United States

Location
- Country: United States
- State: New Hampshire
- County: Sullivan
- Towns: Grantham, Croydon, Newport

Physical characteristics
- Source: Confluence of Sawyer Brook and Stocker Brook
  - location: Grantham
  - coordinates: 43°29′26″N 72°8′8″W
  - elevation: 950 ft (290 m)
- Mouth: Sugar River
  - location: Newport
  - coordinates: 43°23′26″N 72°11′43″W
  - elevation: 761 ft (232 m)
- Length: 10.1 mi (16.3 km)

Basin features
- Tributaries
  - left: Bog Brook
  - right: Littlefield Brook, Swamp Brook, Perkins Brook, Beaver Brook

The North Branch of the Sugar River is a 10.1-mile-long (16.3 km) river located in western New Hampshire in the United States. It is a tributary of the Sugar River, which flows to the Connecticut River, which flows to Long Island Sound.

The North Branch of the Sugar River begins at the confluence of Sawyer Brook and Stocker Brook in the town of Grantham, New Hampshire. The river flows south through the town of Croydon, reaching the Sugar River in the town of Newport. In Croydon, the river's flow is interrupted by Spectacle Pond, a 40-acre (16 ha) two-lobed lake. New Hampshire Route 10 follows the North Branch for nearly its entire length.

== See also ==
- List of rivers of New Hampshire
