= Sugar River (New Hampshire) =

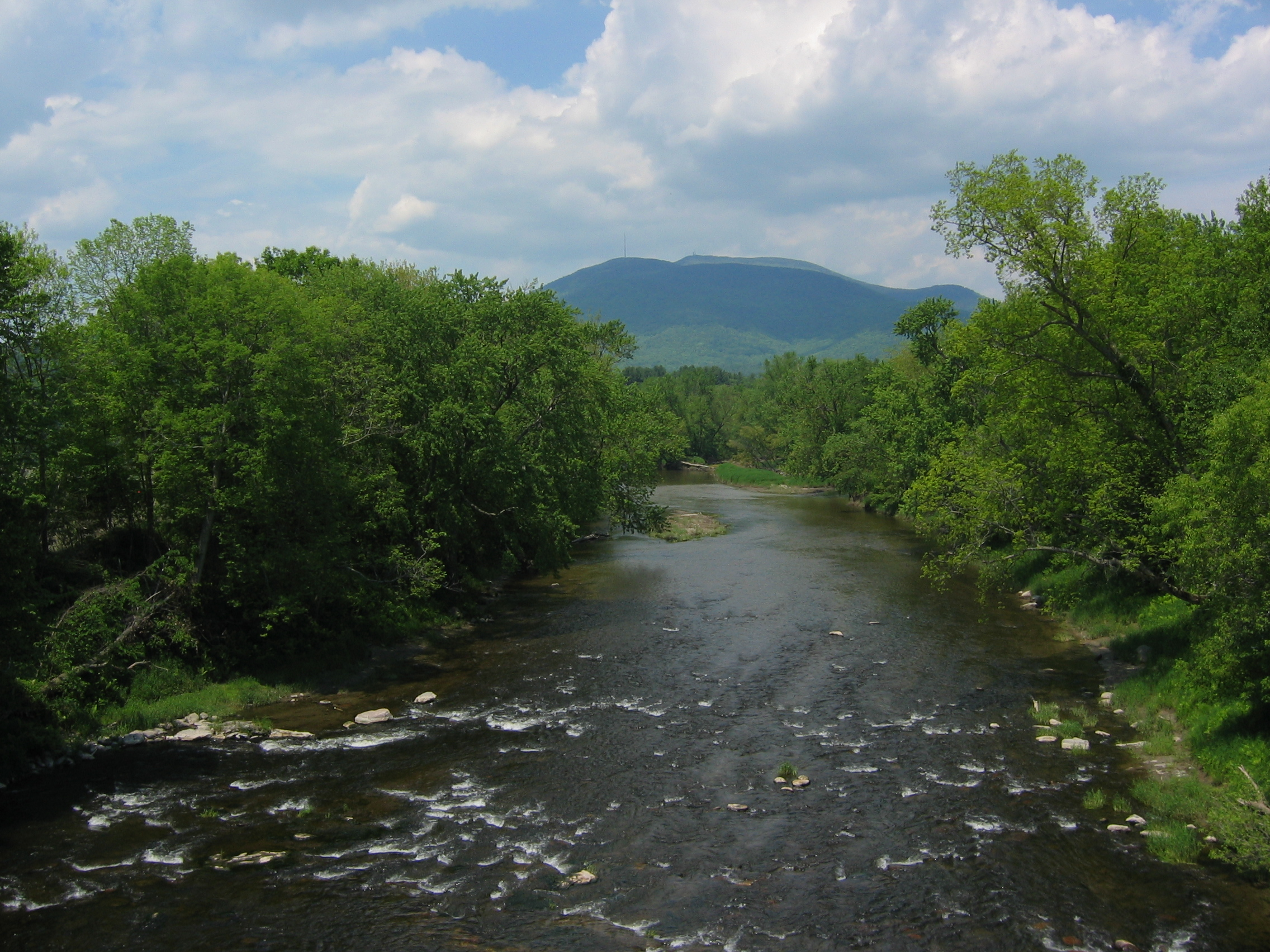
- The Sugar River in Claremont, NH, approaching Mount Ascutney in Vermont

- Location within New Hampshire Location within the United States

Location
- Country: United States
- State: New Hampshire
- County: Sullivan
- Towns and city: Sunapee, Newport, Claremont

Physical characteristics
- Source: Lake Sunapee
  - location: Sunapee
  - coordinates: 43°23′8″N 72°4′52″W
  - elevation: 1,093 ft (333 m)
- Mouth: Connecticut River
  - location: Claremont
  - coordinates: 43°24′7″N 72°23′57″W
  - elevation: 292 ft (89 m)
- Length: 27.0 mi (43.5 km)

Basin features
- Tributaries
  - left: Trask Brook, South Branch Sugar River, Cutts Brook, Quabbinight Brook
  - right: Tucker Brook, Long Pond Brook, North Branch Sugar River, Dodge Brook, Kimball Brook, Ram Brook, Peabody Brook, Grandy Brook, Stevens Brook, Redwater Brook, Walker Brook

The Sugar River is a 27.0-mile-long (43.5 km) river in Sullivan County in western New Hampshire, in the New England region of the United States. It is a tributary of the Connecticut River, New England's longest river, which flows south to Long Island Sound.

The Sugar River originates at the outlet of Lake Sunapee in the town of Sunapee, New Hampshire. From Sunapee, the river flows west through the town of Newport (the Sullivan County seat) and the city of Claremont. Flowing northwest from Claremont, the Sugar River reaches its mouth at the Connecticut River across from the village of Ascutney, Vermont in the town of Weathersfield.

Numerous falls and steep drops on the Sugar River have led to hydro-powered industrial development. Besides the large mill towns of Claremont and Newport, hydro-related developments occur in the villages of Sunapee, Wendell, Guild, and West Claremont.

Three New Hampshire state highways parallel portions of the Sugar River's path. New Hampshire Route 103 follows the river westward from the village of Wendell all the way to its mouth at the Connecticut River. New Hampshire Route 11, which runs entirely across the state, follows the river from the village of Sunapee westward to Claremont's city center (overlapped with NH Route 103). New Hampshire Route 12 then follows the river from the center of Claremont northwest to its mouth (also overlapped with NH Route 103). Just north of the river's mouth, NH Route 103 terminates at the Connecticut River (which is also the Vermont state line), while NH Route 12 crosses the Connecticut and becomes Vermont Route 12.

An inactive railroad known as the Concord to Claremont Line follows the Sugar River from Wendell to the river's mouth.

Tributaries of the Sugar River include the South Branch, entering in Newport, and the North Branch, entering between Newport and North Newport.

== History ==
The upper Connecticut River valley is the ancestral home of the Abenaki people. A significant prehistoric native american site, the Hunter Archeological Site, is located at a series of terraces near the mouth of the Sugar River.

== In popular culture ==
In the 1906 best-selling novel Coniston, "Coniston Water" was based on the Sugar River.

The Newport-based Sugar River Bank takes its name from the river. The bank currently operates in six New Hampshire communities, including the state capital of Concord.

== See also ==
- List of rivers of New Hampshire
