= Newport Opera House =

- Town Hall and Courthouse
- U.S. National Register of Historic Places
- U.S. Historic district – Contributing property
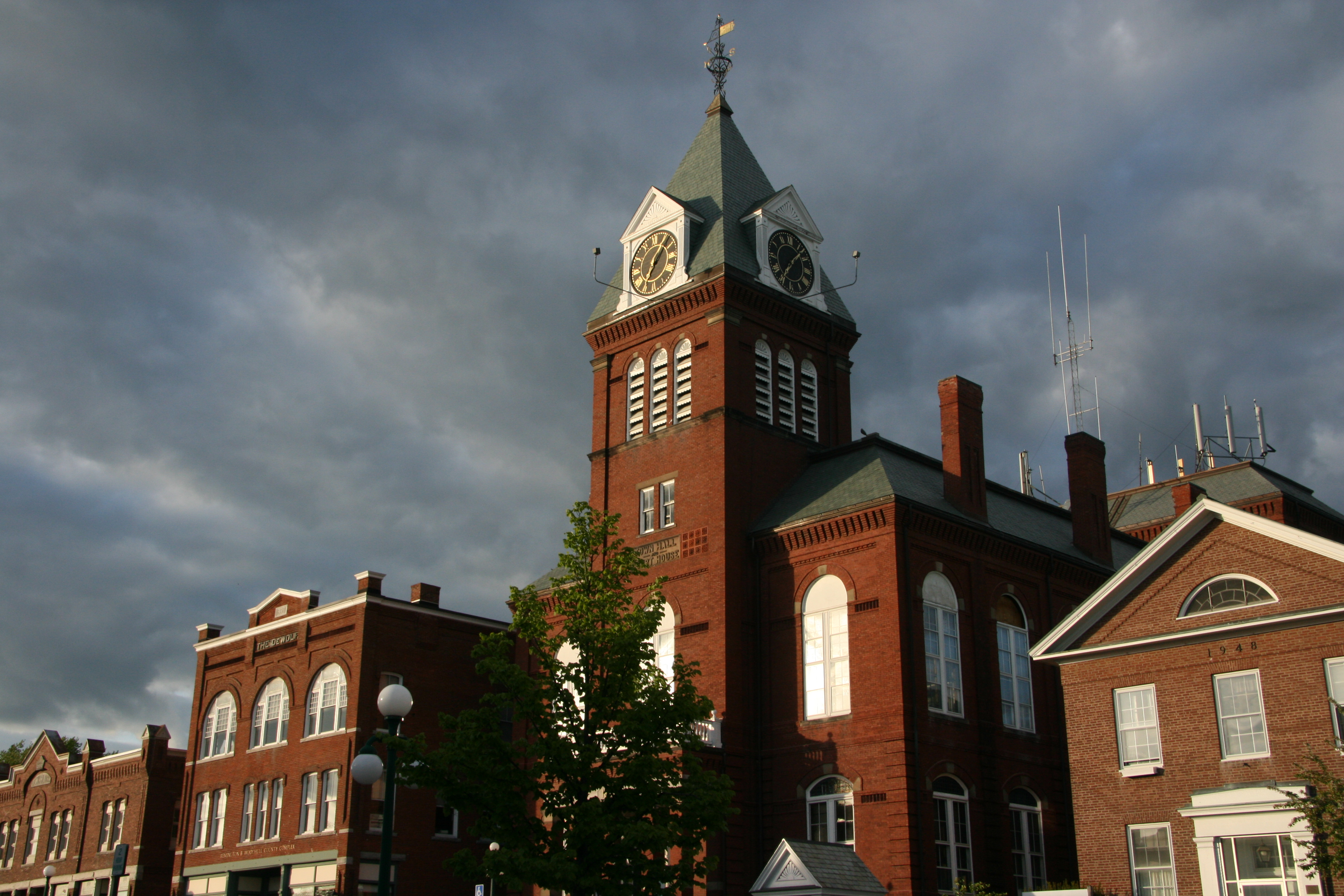

- Location within New Hampshire Location within the United States
- Location: 20 Main St., Newport, New Hampshire
- Coordinates: 43°21′53″N 72°10′22″W
- Area: 0.5 acres (0.20 ha)
- Architectural style: Queen Anne, Queen Anne/Brick Panel
- Part of: Newport Downtown Historic District (ID85001201)
- NRHP reference No.: 80000383

Significant dates
- Added to NRHP: February 29, 1980
- Designated CP: June 6, 1985

The Newport Opera House is a historic civic building and performing arts venue at 20 Main Street in the heart of downtown Newport, the county seat of Sullivan County, New Hampshire, United States. Built in 1886, it was billed as having the largest stage in New England north of Boston, and continues to serve as a performance venue today. The building was listed on the National Register of Historic Places, as "Town Hall and Courthouse", in 1980, for its architecture and civic roles, and is a contributing property in the Newport Downtown Historic District.

== Description and history ==
The Newport Opera House is located on the east side of Main Street in downtown Newport. The 2 1/2-story brick building, with its clock and bell tower, is the most prominent feature of Newport's historic downtown. Architecturally the building is of a restrained Queen Anne Victorian style, with Panel Brick elements. Its main block is capped by a hip roof, with a corbelled brick cornice. Trim elements are mainly brick, but are accented with terra cotta panels. Windows on the ground floor are topped by segmented arches, while those on the second story have round-arch tops. The tower projects from the front facade, with the main entrance at its front. It has a belfry stage, which for a time housed the Revere bell that now stands in front of the building. Above the belfry stage the tower has a pyramidal roof from which gabled dormers project that house clock faces.

The building was built in 1886 to replace the previous town hall and courthouse which had burned down in 1885. It was designed by Hiram Beckwith, a regionally prominent architect from Claremont. It served for many years as Newport's town hall and as the main courthouse for Sullivan County, and has long served the region as a performance space The rebuilt Opera House was noted to have the largest stage north of Boston. In 1974, the Opera House was restored, which concluded with the unveiling of the stage in 1976 and the production of The Music Man.

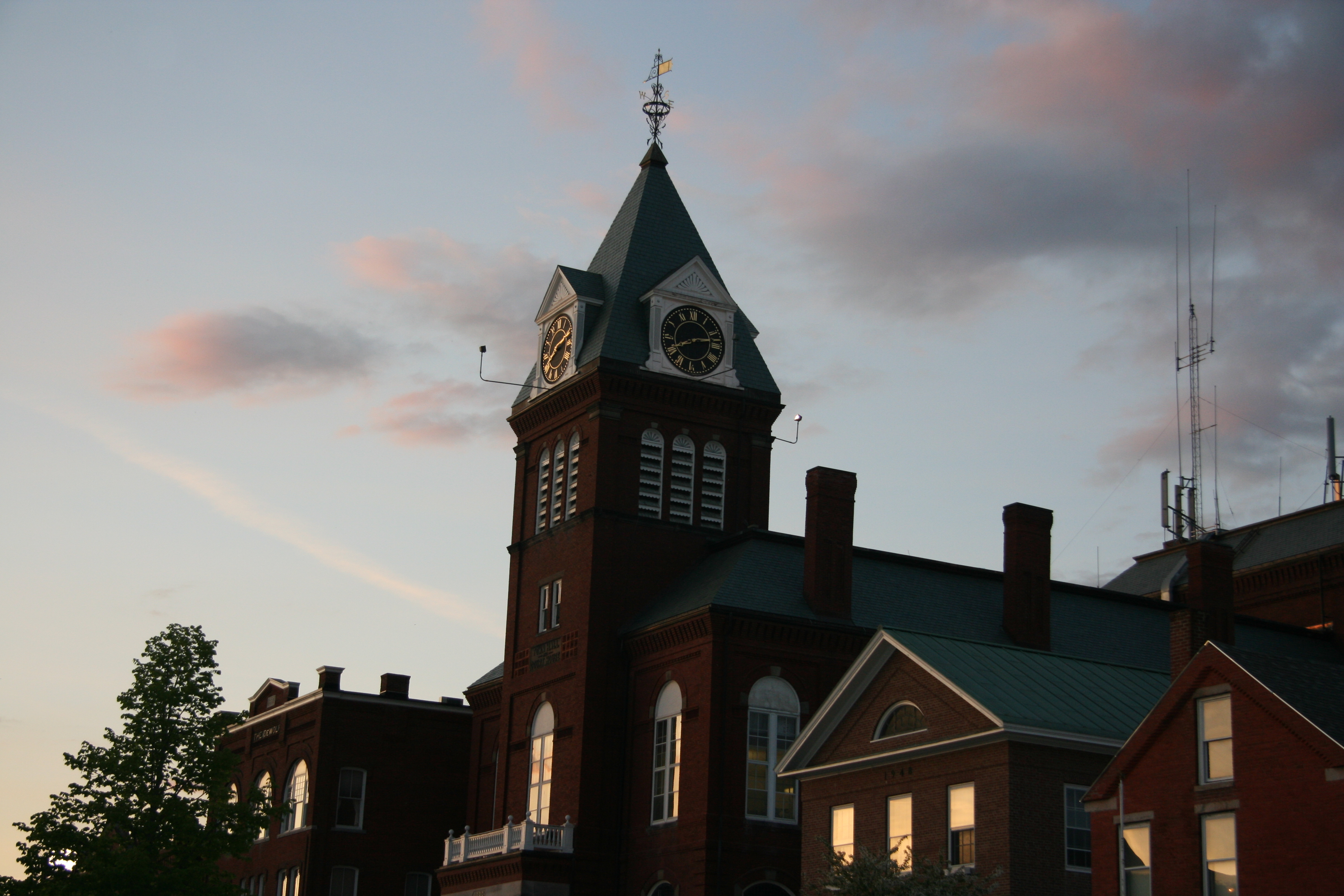

== See also ==
- National Register of Historic Places listings in Sullivan County, New Hampshire
