= Newport, New Hampshire =

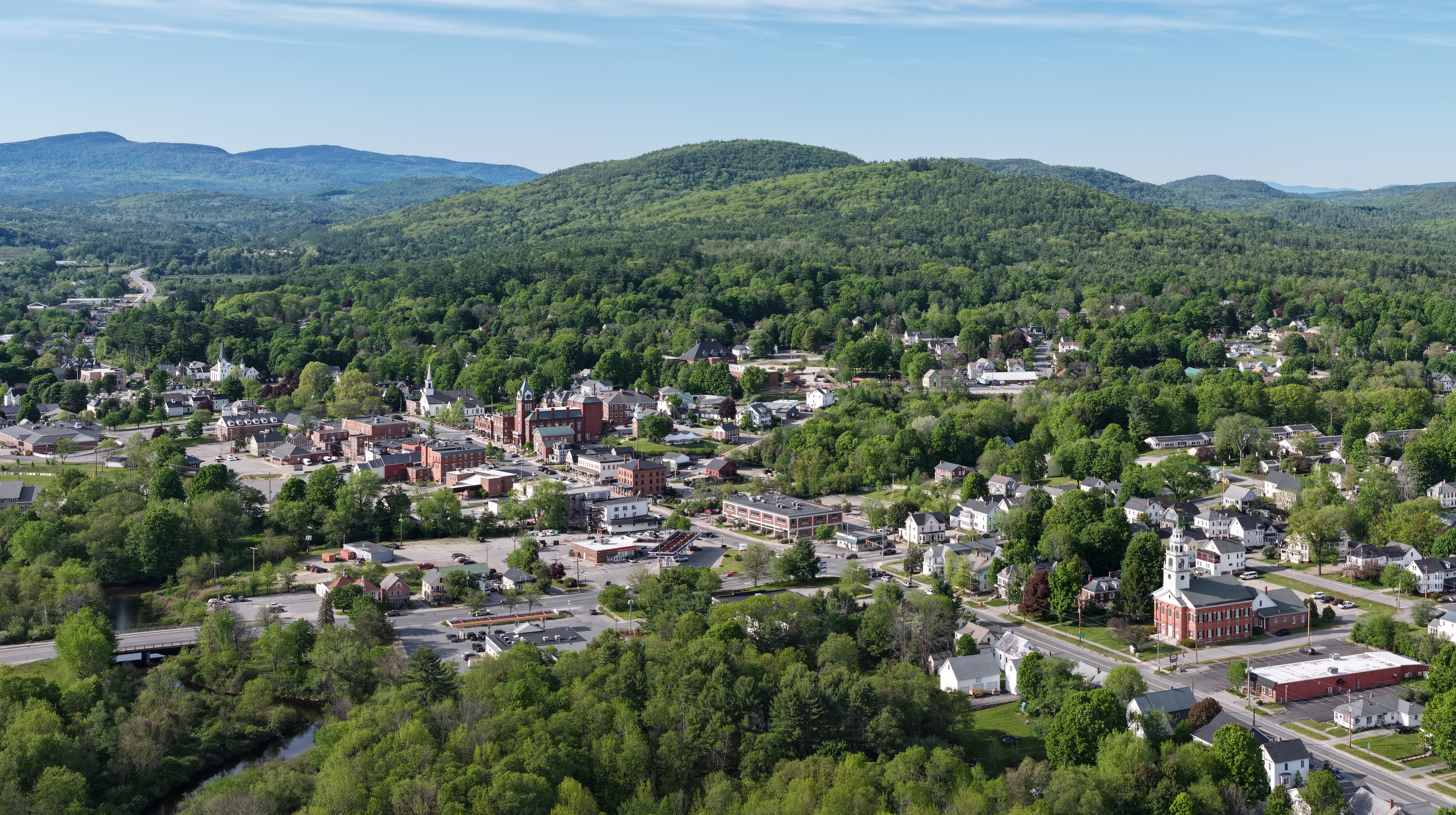
- Newport, New Hampshire, from the south

- Seal
- Nickname: "The Sunshine Town"
- Location in Sullivan County and the state of New Hampshire
- Coordinates: 43°21′54″N 72°12′0″W
- Country: United States
- State: New Hampshire
- County: Sullivan
- Incorporated: 1761
- Villages: Newport; Guild; Kelleyville; North Newport

Area
  - Total: 43.64 sq mi (113.04 km^{2})
  - Land: 43.57 sq mi (112.85 km^{2})
  - Water: 0.073 sq mi (0.19 km^{2}) 0.16%
- Elevation: 965 ft (294 m)

Population (2020)
  - Total: 6,299
  - Density: 145/sq mi (55.8/km^{2})
- Time zone: UTC-5 (Eastern)
  - Summer (DST): UTC-4 (Eastern)
- ZIP codes: 03773 (Newport); 03754 (Guild)
- Area code: 603
- FIPS code: 33-52580
- GNIS feature ID: 873684
- Website: www.newportnh.gov

Newport is a town in and the county seat of Sullivan County, New Hampshire, United States. It is 43 miles (69 km) west-northwest of Concord, the state capital. The population of Newport was 6,299 at the 2020 census. A covered bridge is in the northwest. The area is noted for maple sugar and apple orchards. Prior to county division in 1827, Newport was in Cheshire County. The central part of town, where 4,735 people resided at the 2020 census, is defined as the Newport census-designated place (CDP) and is located next to the Sugar River at the junction of New Hampshire routes 10 and 11. The town also includes the villages of Kelleyville, Guild, and North Newport.

== History ==
Granted in 1753 by colonial governor Benning Wentworth, the town was named "Grenville" after George Grenville, Prime Minister of Great Britain and brother-in-law of William Pitt. But ongoing hostilities during the French and Indian War, as close as the Fort at Number 4 at Charlestown, delayed settlement. Nevertheless, in 1761 the town was incorporated as "Newport", for Henry Newport, a distinguished English soldier and statesman.

It was first settled in 1763 by pioneers from North Killingworth, Connecticut. Absalom Kelsey was one of the earliest settlers, on what became later the D.F. Pike farm at the foot of Claremont Hill. At that time, the Connecticut River was the only route for travel, until a road was cut through the wilderness to Charlestown in 1767. The following year, the first gristmill was established. But dissatisfied with treatment by the state government far beyond the mountains, Newport in 1781 joined 33 other towns along the Connecticut River and seceded from New Hampshire to join Vermont. George Washington, however, dissolved their union with Vermont in 1782, and the towns rejoined New Hampshire.

With excellent soil for farming, and abundant water power from the Sugar River and its South Branch to run mills, Newport grew prosperous. The first cotton mill was established by Colonel James D. Wolcott in 1813. Local cabinet making flourished, producing much fine furniture. In 1817, perhaps inspired by the Erie Canal, businessmen proposed digging a canal to connect the Connecticut and Merrimack rivers—beginning with the Sugar River, and using its source, Lake Sunapee, as a reservoir. The plan was abandoned before it got started. In 1871, the Sugar River Railroad connected to Newport from Bradford.

But the Sugar River was recognized as central to industrial development, and in 1820, mill owners from Claremont, Sunapee and Newport united to create the Sunapee Dam Corporation, which built a dam to regulate the river's flow, running mill machinery even during drought. This plan worked, and over 120 water wheels would turn along the stream's course. By 1859, when the population was 2,020, Newport had three woolen mills and two tanneries. It also had the Sibley Scythe Company, established in 1842, which manufactured the scythes that cleared jungle during construction of the Panama Canal. The company closed in 1929.

The venerable mill town has significant architectural landmarks, including the 1823 South Congregational Church designed by Elias Carter, the Newport Opera House built in 1886, and the Richards Free Library, built as the home of Colonel Seth Mason Richards in 1898.

Photos from the early 20th century:

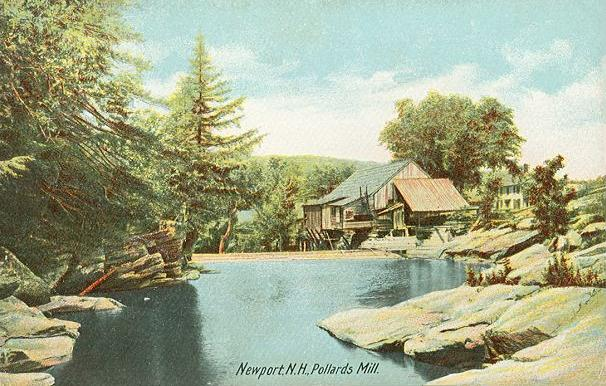
Pollards Mill in 1906

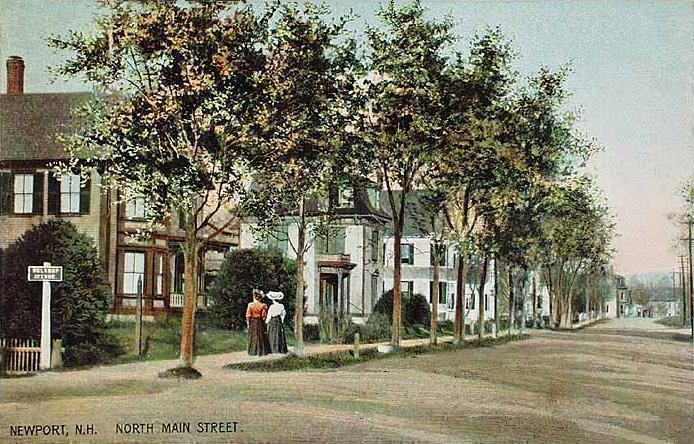
North Main Street c. 1908

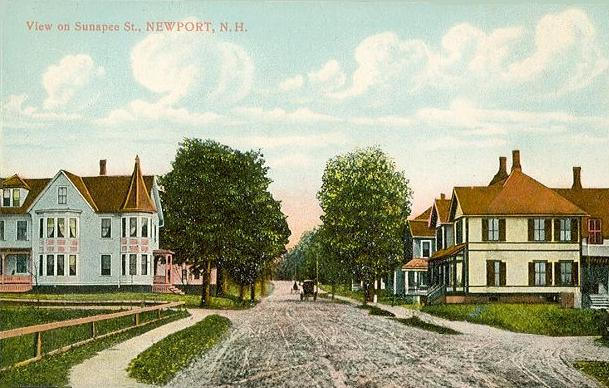
Sunapee Street in 1908

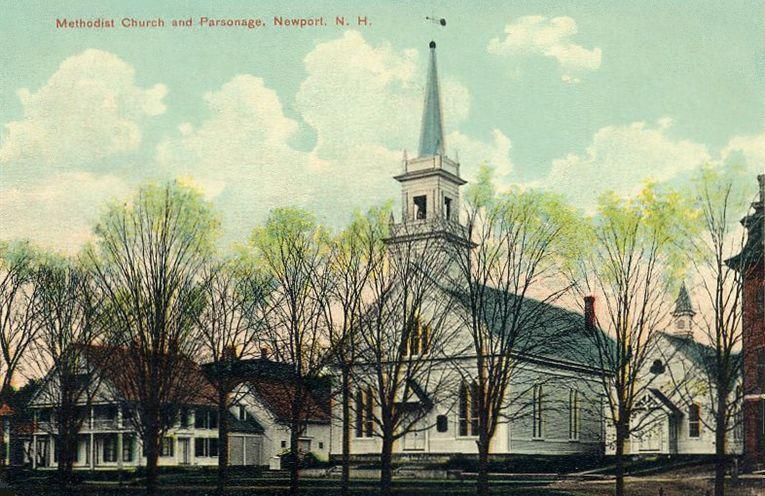
Methodist Church in 1909

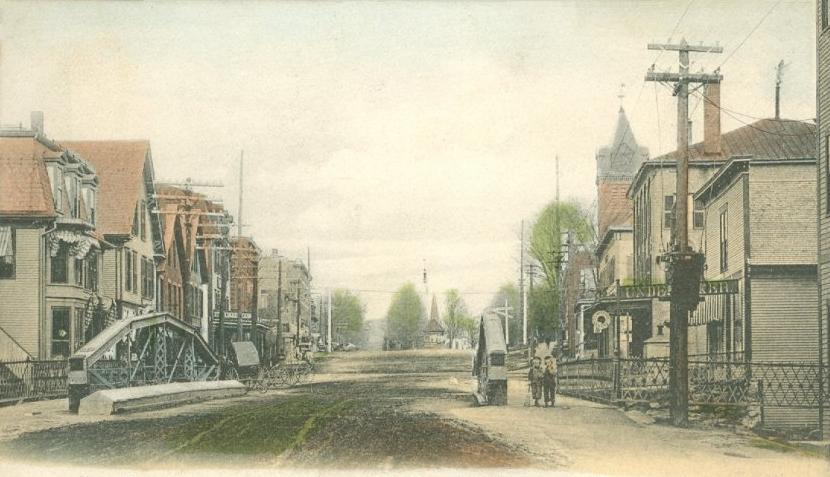
Main Street in 1906

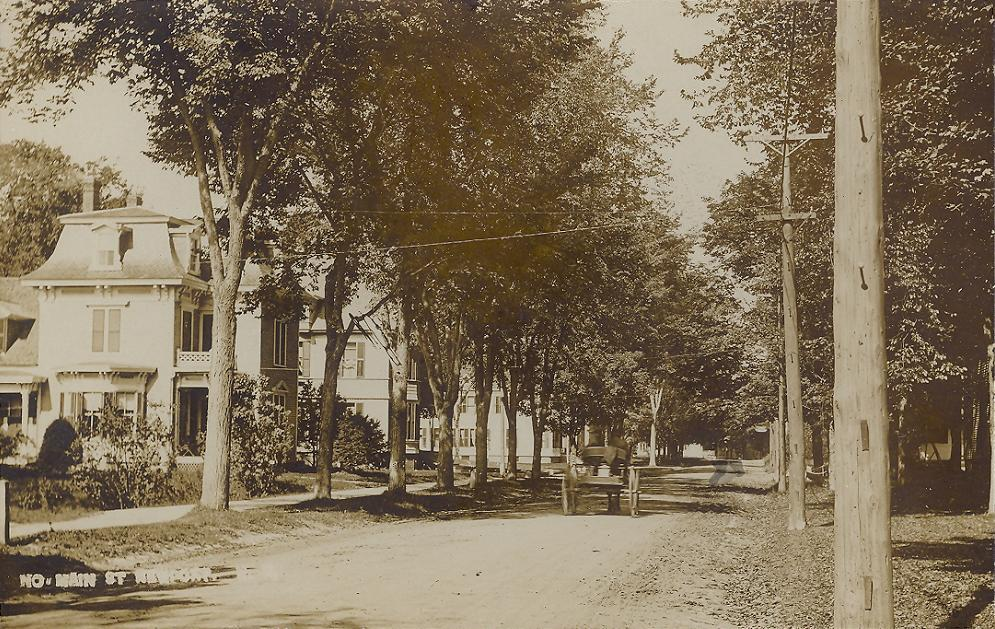
North Main Street in 1914

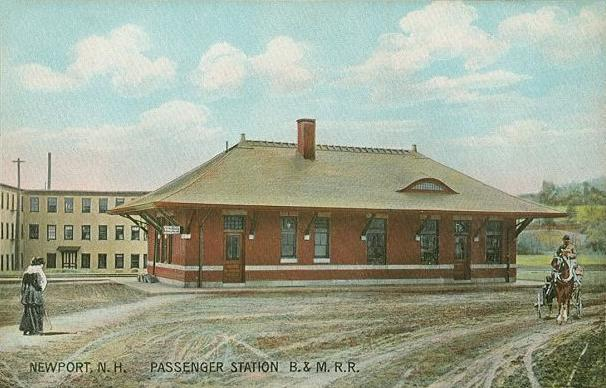
B. & M. Railroad station in 1907

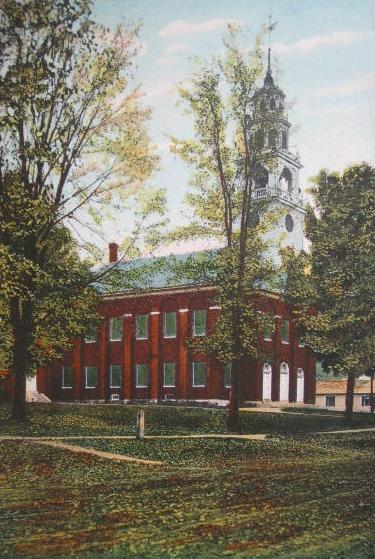
South Congregational Church c. 1910

=== Earliest settlers (1766) ===
During the summer and fall of 1765, six young men came to Newport from Killingworth, Connecticut, cleared six acres of land each, and, after getting in a crop of rye, returned home and spent the winter. The following year, in June 1766, these men having an addition of two to their number, making eight in all, five having families, came and made the first permanent settlement. No record or tradition is found showing the precise day of their arrival. All accounts agree that they arrived in town Saturday night; that they were detained by a bad place in the road on Pike Hill, where they camped for the night; and the following day, after accomplishing the remainder of their journey, they spent in religious worship under the shadow of a pine tree which stood just south of the A. Pease residence.

The following were among the earliest settlers, the first five having families.

- Zepheniah Clark
- Ebenezer Merrit
- Benjamin Bragg
- Samuel Hurd
- Jesse Wilcox
- James Church
- William Stanard
- Ezra Parmelee
- Jesse Lane
- Jesse Kelsey
- Benjamin Giles
- Nathan Hurd
- Charles Avery
- Ephraim Towner
- Absalom Kelsey
- Amos Hall
- Roswell Hull
- Daniel Dudley

== Geography ==
According to the United States Census Bureau, the town has a total area of 43.6 square miles (113.0 km^{2}), of which 43.6 square miles (112.9 km^{2}) are land and 0.1 square miles (0.2 km^{2}) are water, comprising 0.16% of the town. Besides Newport's downtown area, settlements within the town include North Newport, Kelleyville (in the western part of the town), Guild (in the eastern part of the town), and Wendell, on the town's eastern border with Sunapee.

Newport is drained by the west-flowing Sugar River and its South Branch, with the town center at their confluence. The North Branch joins the Sugar River north of Newport village and east of North Newport. The entire town is part of the Connecticut River watershed. The highest point in town is along its southern border, where an unnamed ridge has an elevation of approximately 1,920 feet (590 m) above sea level.

The town is served by state routes 10, 11 and 103. Newport is home to Parlin Field Airport.

=== Adjacent municipalities ===
- Croydon (north)
- Sunapee (east)
- Goshen (southeast)
- Unity (south)
- Claremont (west)

Photos from the early 21st century:

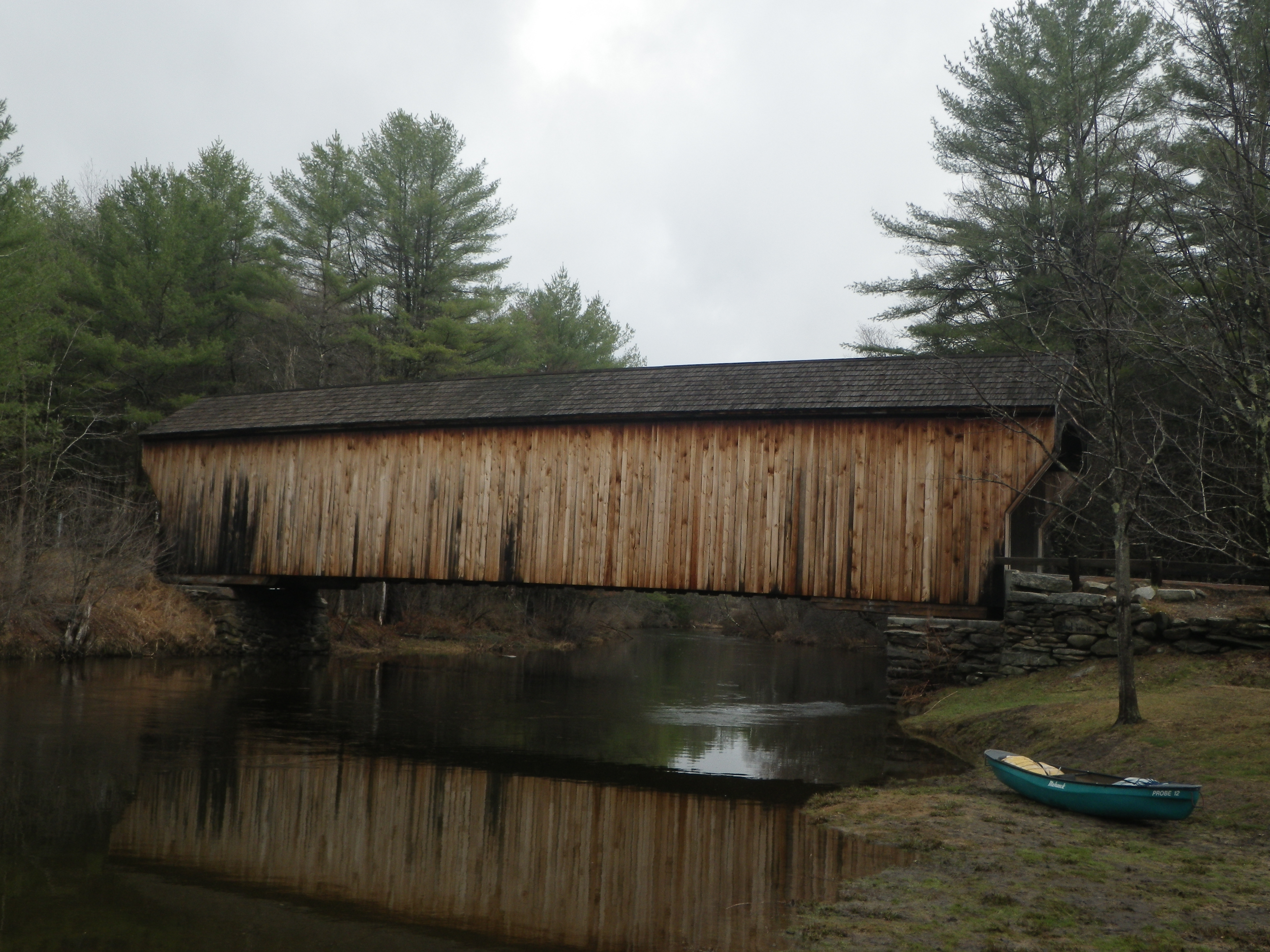
Corbin Covered Bridge over North Branch Sugar River

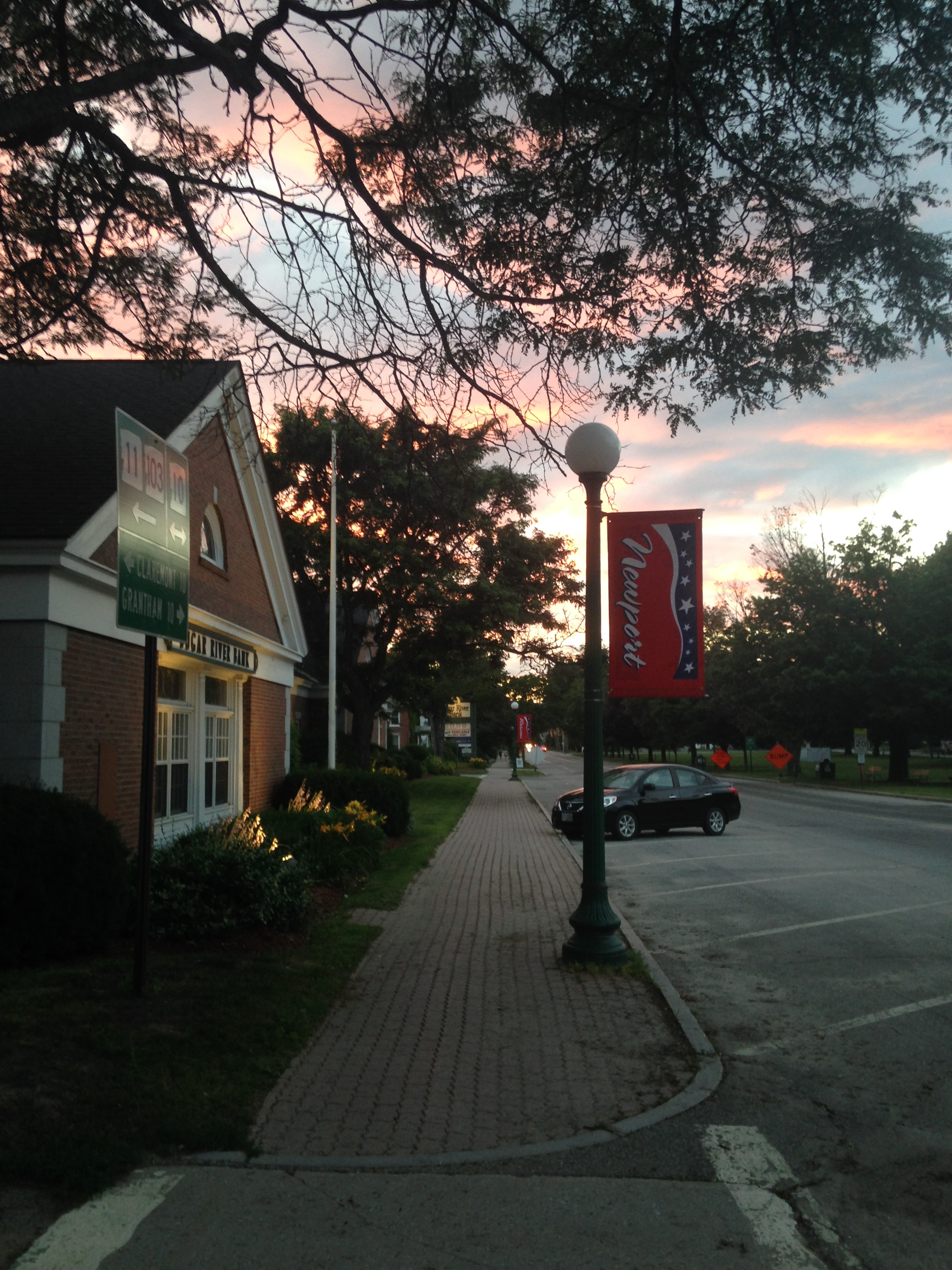
Downtown Newport looking north

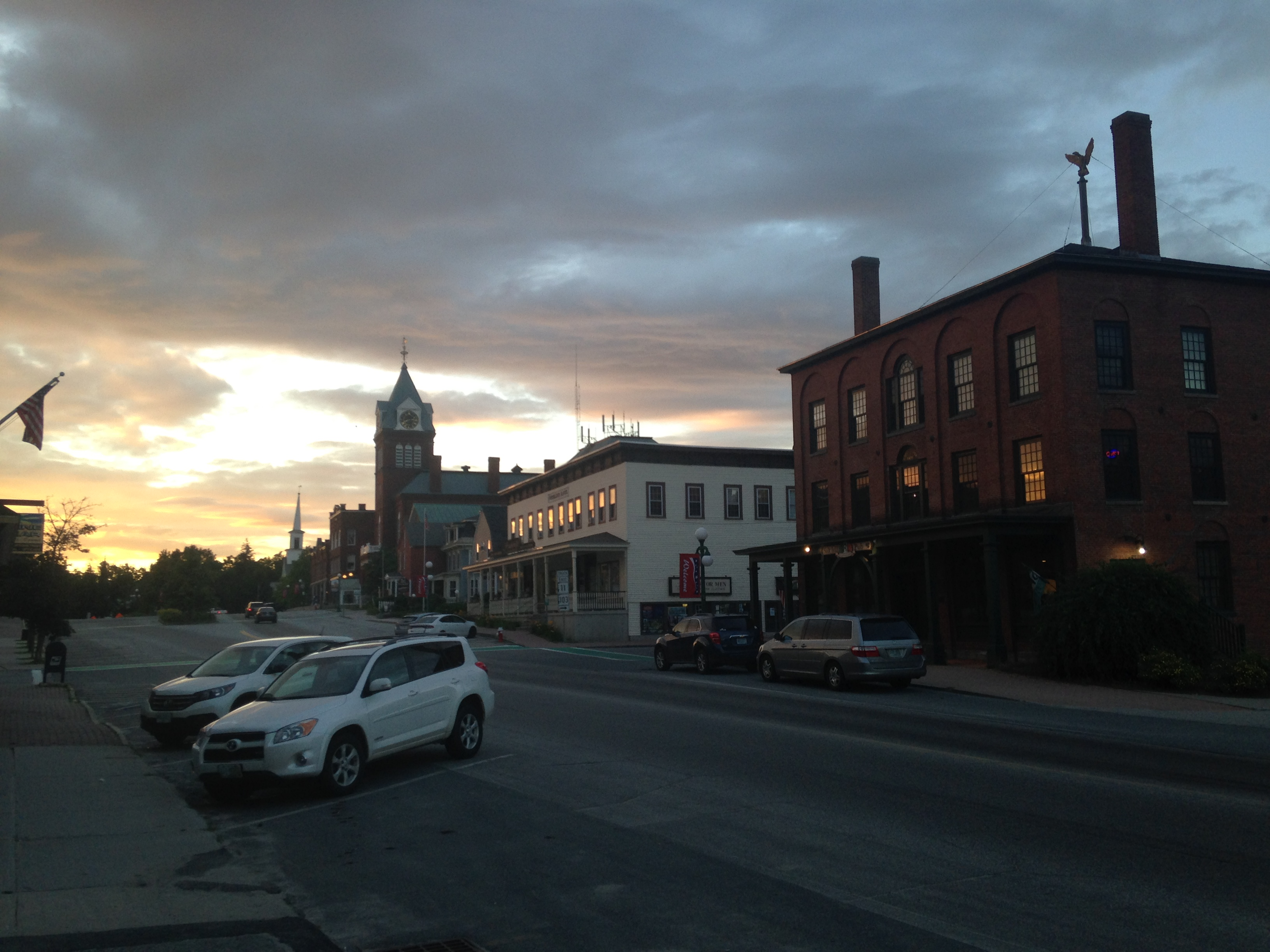
Downtown Newport

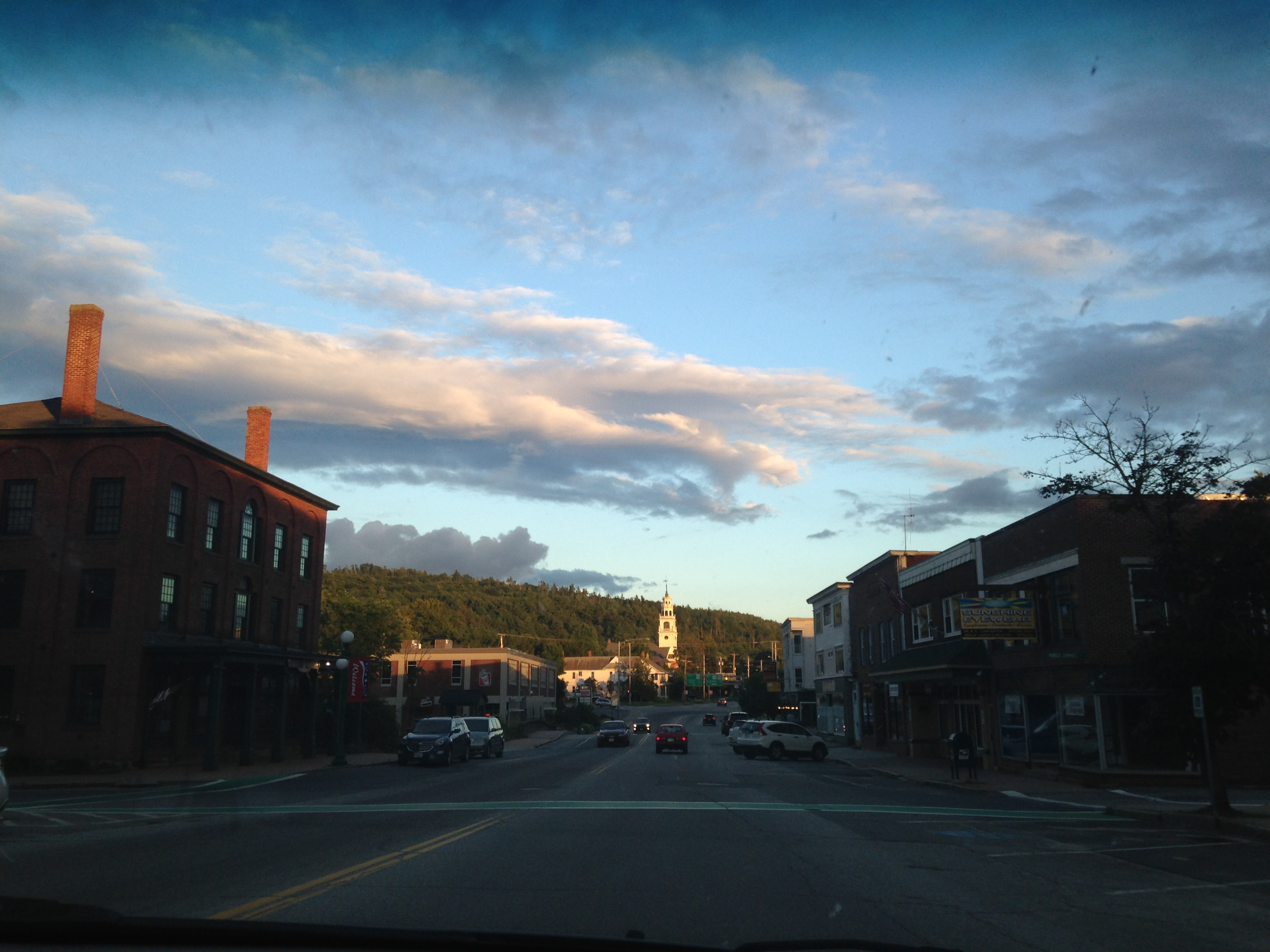
Downtown Newport looking south

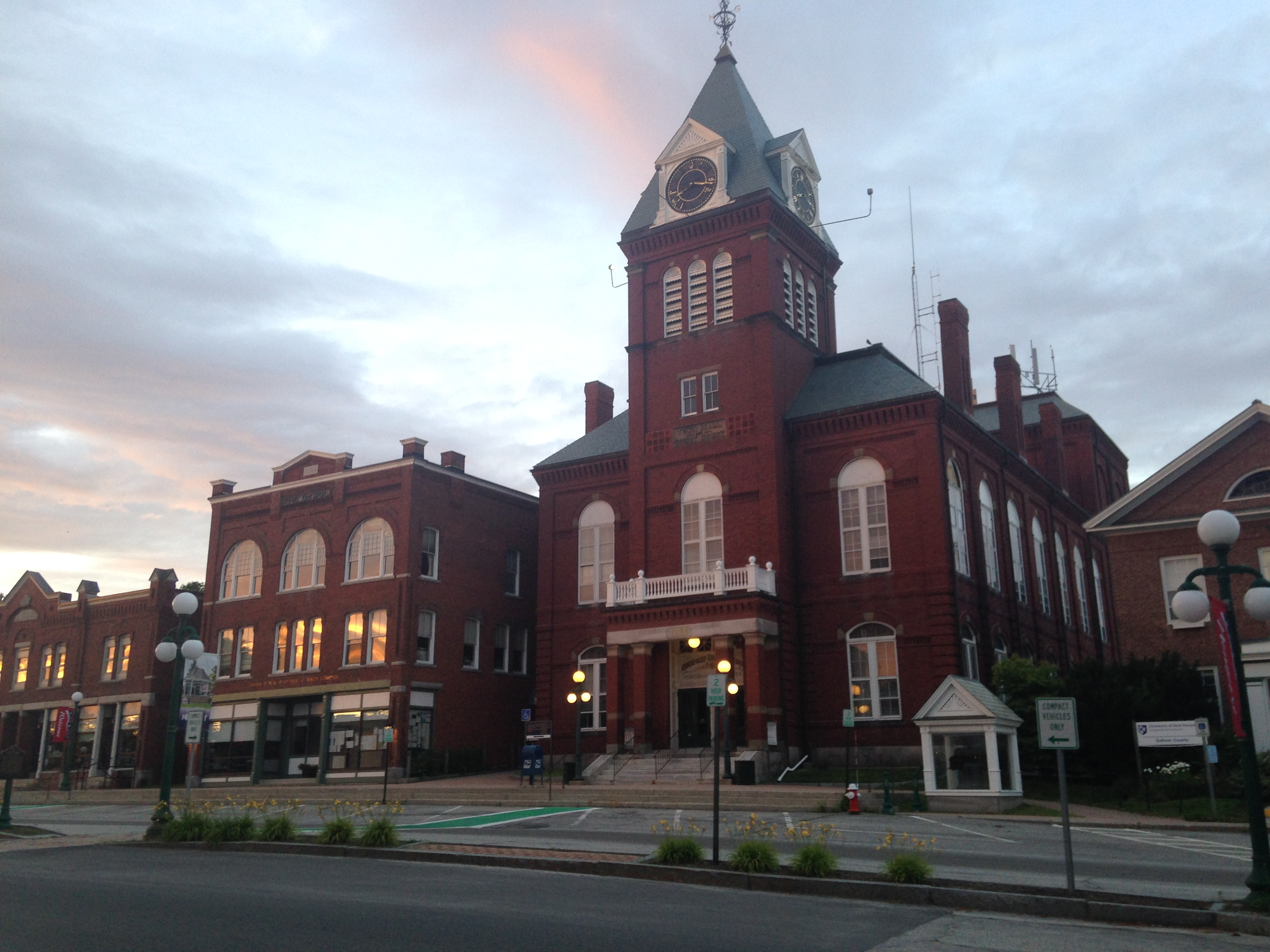
Newport Town Hall

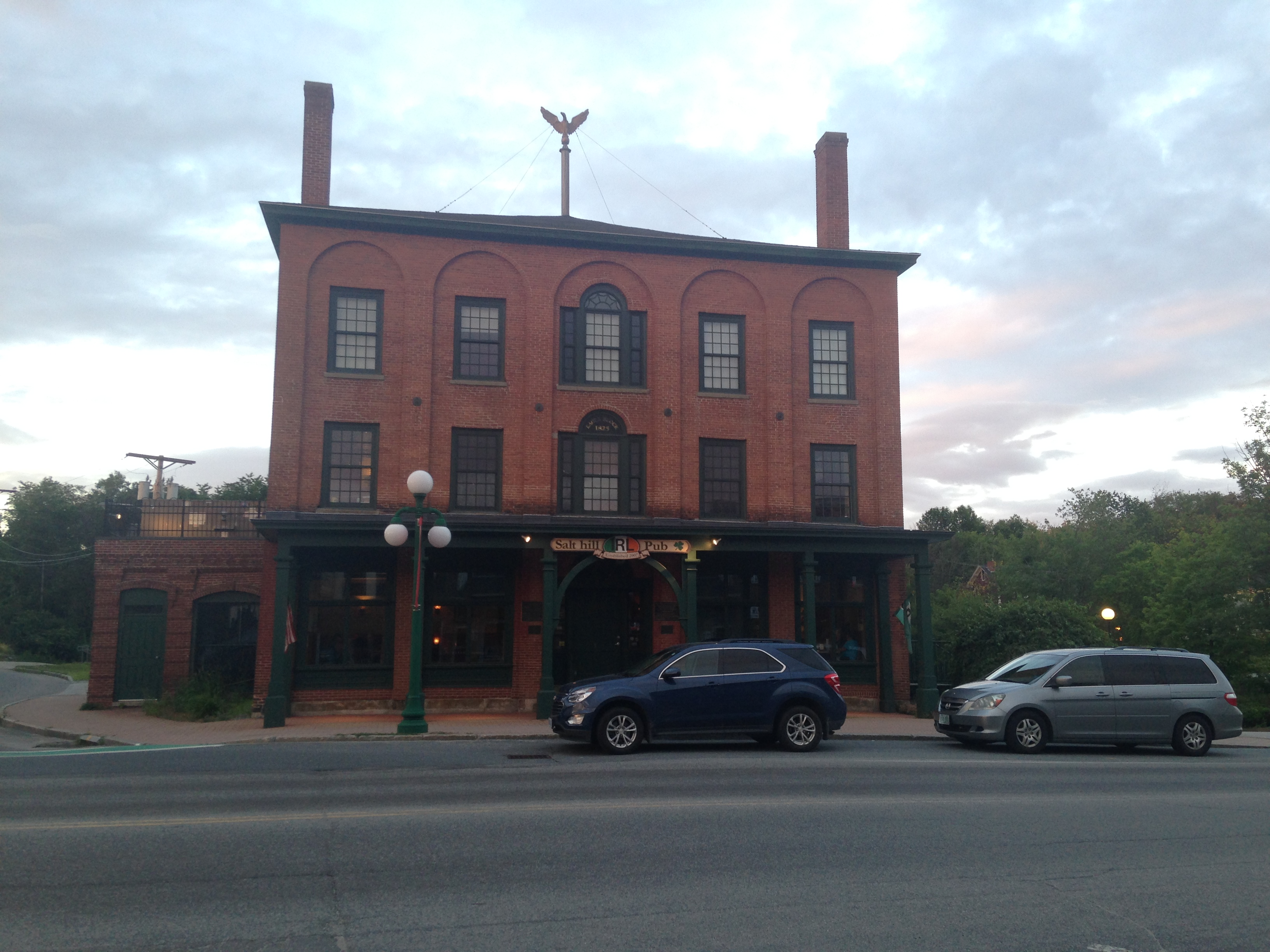
Salt Hill Pub

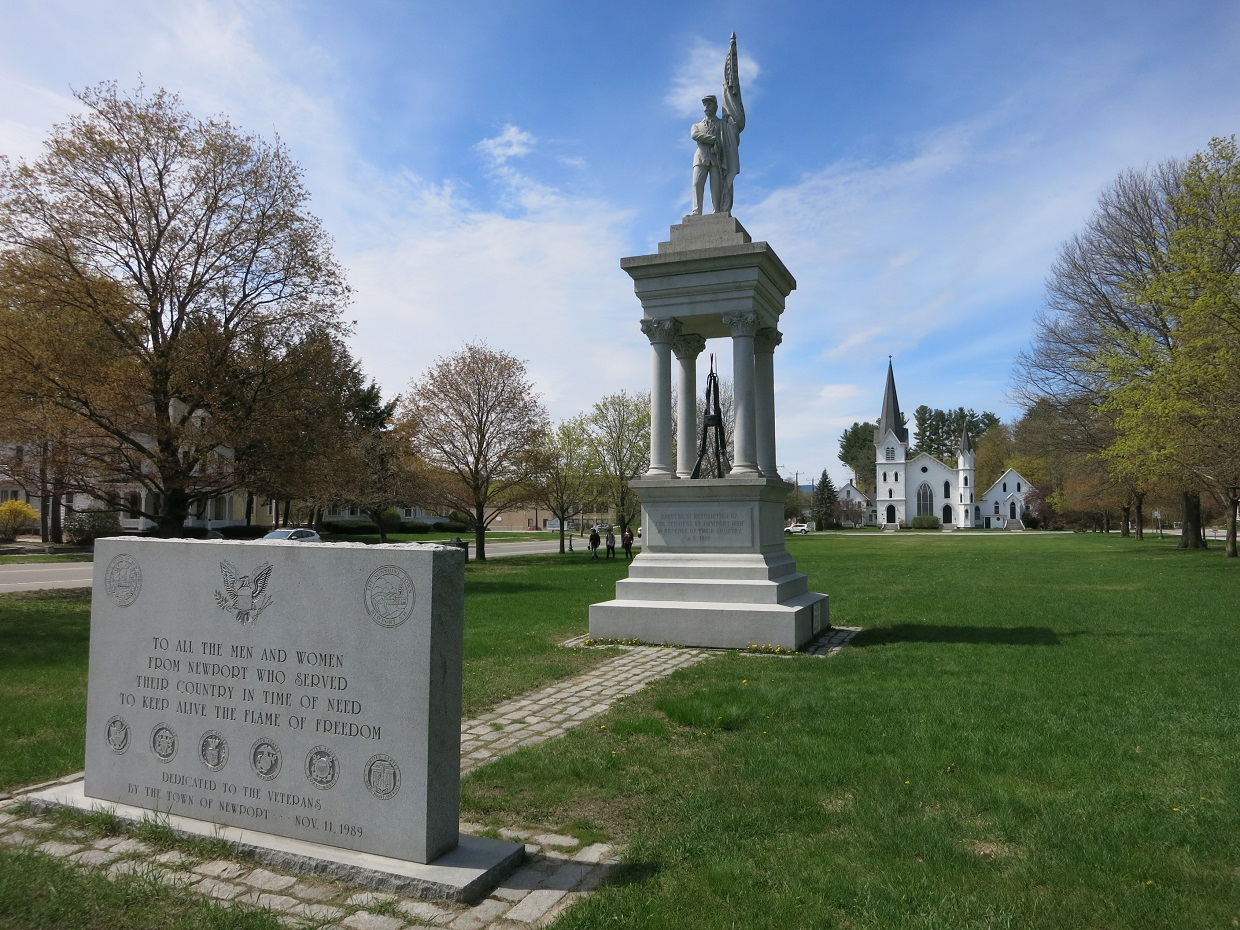
Soldiers Memorial

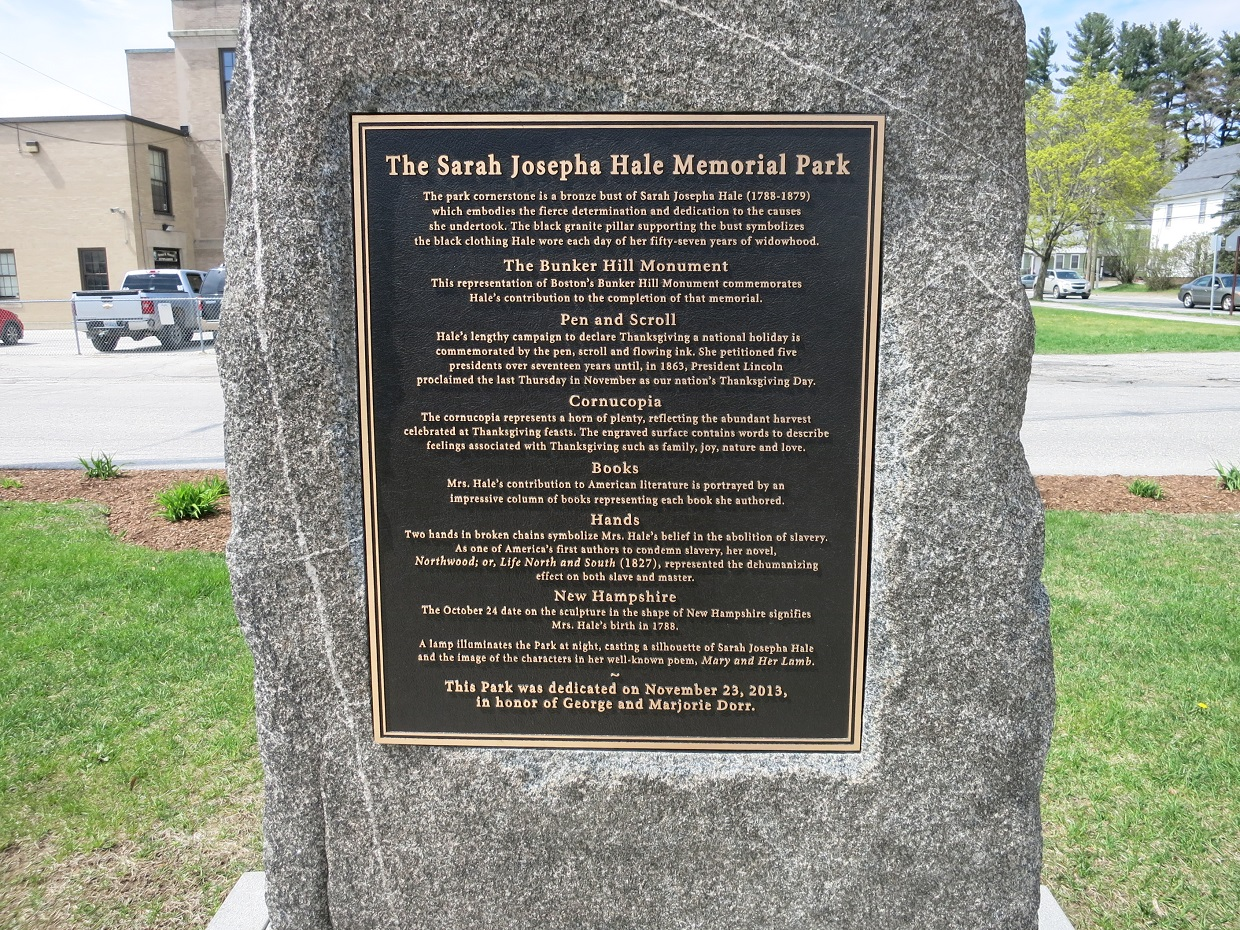
Sarah J. Hale plaque

=== Climate ===
According to the Köppen Climate Classification system, Newport has a warm-summer humid continental climate, abbreviated "Dfb" on climate maps. The hottest temperature recorded in Newport was 97 °F (36.1 °C) on July 15, 1995, while the coldest temperature recorded was −40 °F (−40.0 °C) on January 20, 1994.

Climate data for Newport, New Hampshire, 1991–2020 normals, extremes 1970–present
Month	Jan	Feb	Mar	Apr	May	Jun	Jul	Aug	Sep	Oct	Nov	Dec	Year
Record high °F (°C)	66 (19)	67 (19)	81 (27)	90 (32)	92 (33)	96 (36)	97 (36)	96 (36)	94 (34)	85 (29)	77 (25)	68 (20)	97 (36)
Mean maximum °F (°C)	51.7 (10.9)	53.4 (11.9)	63.1 (17.3)	78.3 (25.7)	86.2 (30.1)	90.2 (32.3)	91.5 (33.1)	89.9 (32.2)	86.3 (30.2)	76.1 (24.5)	66.8 (19.3)	54.5 (12.5)	93.0 (33.9)
Mean daily maximum °F (°C)	29.3 (−1.5)	32.4 (0.2)	40.6 (4.8)	53.6 (12.0)	66.4 (19.1)	74.9 (23.8)	80.1 (26.7)	78.6 (25.9)	71.0 (21.7)	58.0 (14.4)	45.5 (7.5)	34.8 (1.6)	55.4 (13.0)
Daily mean °F (°C)	19.2 (−7.1)	21.2 (−6.0)	29.7 (−1.3)	42.1 (5.6)	54.1 (12.3)	63.2 (17.3)	68.3 (20.2)	66.4 (19.1)	58.8 (14.9)	46.7 (8.2)	36.1 (2.3)	25.9 (−3.4)	44.3 (6.8)
Mean daily minimum °F (°C)	9.1 (−12.7)	10.0 (−12.2)	18.8 (−7.3)	30.5 (−0.8)	41.8 (5.4)	51.5 (10.8)	56.4 (13.6)	54.3 (12.4)	46.6 (8.1)	35.5 (1.9)	26.7 (−2.9)	17.0 (−8.3)	33.2 (0.7)
Mean minimum °F (°C)	−13.9 (−25.5)	−12.2 (−24.6)	−5.7 (−20.9)	16.9 (−8.4)	27.2 (−2.7)	36.6 (2.6)	44.7 (7.1)	41.4 (5.2)	30.9 (−0.6)	20.6 (−6.3)	10.1 (−12.2)	−5.3 (−20.7)	−17.5 (−27.5)
Record low °F (°C)	−40 (−40)	−28 (−33)	−18 (−28)	4 (−16)	19 (−7)	27 (−3)	35 (2)	31 (−1)	21 (−6)	10 (−12)	−4 (−20)	−21 (−29)	−40 (−40)
Average precipitation inches (mm)	2.73 (69)	2.36 (60)	2.96 (75)	3.26 (83)	3.33 (85)	4.23 (107)	4.19 (106)	3.75 (95)	3.53 (90)	4.88 (124)	3.19 (81)	3.54 (90)	41.95 (1,065)
Average snowfall inches (cm)	15.2 (39)	16.7 (42)	12.7 (32)	3.3 (8.4)	0.0 (0.0)	0.0 (0.0)	0.0 (0.0)	0.0 (0.0)	0.0 (0.0)	0.5 (1.3)	2.8 (7.1)	14.9 (38)	66.1 (167.8)
Average extreme snow depth inches (cm)	12.8 (33)	15.5 (39)	14.0 (36)	4.8 (12)	0.0 (0.0)	0.0 (0.0)	0.0 (0.0)	0.0 (0.0)	0.0 (0.0)	0.6 (1.5)	2.0 (5.1)	8.9 (23)	18.0 (46)
Average precipitation days (≥ 0.01 in)	11.2	9.3	10.6	10.6	12.9	13.4	12.6	11.6	11.1	12.5	10.4	12.0	138.2
Average snowy days (≥ 0.1 in)	7.5	6.5	5.4	1.4	0.1	0.0	0.0	0.0	0.0	0.3	1.9	6.6	29.7
Source 1: NOAA
Source 2: National Weather Service

== Demographics ==
Historical population
Census	Pop.	Note	%±
1790	780		—
1800	1,266		62.3%
1810	1,427		12.7%
1820	1,679		17.7%
1830	1,913		13.9%
1840	1,958		2.4%
1850	2,020		3.2%
1860	2,077		2.8%
1870	2,163		4.1%
1880	2,612		20.8%
1890	2,623		0.4%
1900	3,126		19.2%
1910	3,765		20.4%
1920	4,109		9.1%
1930	4,659		13.4%
1940	5,304		13.8%
1950	5,131		−3.3%
1960	5,458		6.4%
1970	5,899		8.1%
1980	6,229		5.6%
1990	6,110		−1.9%
2000	6,269		2.6%
2010	6,507		3.8%
2020	6,299		−3.2%
U.S. Decennial Census

As of the census of 2010, there were 6,507 people, 2,629 households, and 1,706 families residing in the town. There were 2,938 housing units, of which 309, or 10.5%, were vacant. The racial makeup of the town was 97.2% white, 0.3% African American, 0.2% Native American, 0.4% Asian, 0.0% Native Hawaiian or Pacific Islander, 0.3% some other race, and 1.6% from two or more races. 1.1% of the population were Hispanic or Latino of any race.

Of the 2,629 households, 31.2% had children under the age of 18 living with them, 46.1% were headed by married couples living together, 12.6% had a female householder with no husband present, and 35.1% were non-families. 27.1% of all households were made up of individuals, and 12.9% were someone living alone who was 65 years of age or older. The average household size was 2.43, and the average family size was 2.89.

In the town, 22.8% of the population were under the age of 18, 8.4% were from 18 to 24, 23.1% from 25 to 44, 29.7% from 45 to 64, and 16.0% were 65 years of age or older. The median age was 41.7 years. For every 100 females, there were 94.2 males. For every 100 females age 18 and over, there were 88.9 males.

For the period 2011–2015, the estimated median annual income for a household was $49,663, and the median income for a family was $60,317. The per capita income for the town was $25,969. 9.6% of the population and 4.6% of families were below the poverty line. 6.9% of the population under the age of 18 and 8.7% of those 65 or older were living in poverty.

== Infrastructure ==
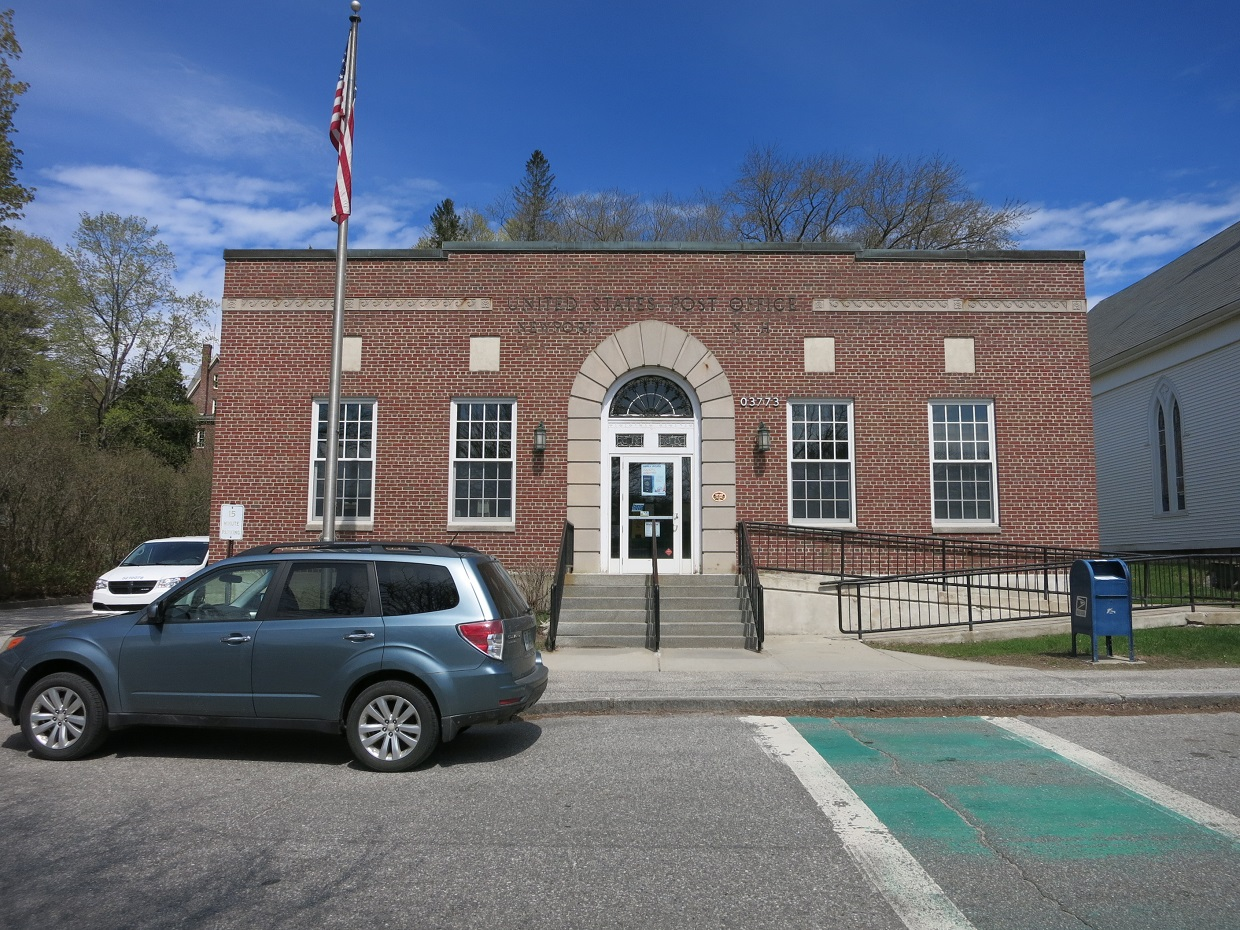
US Post Office

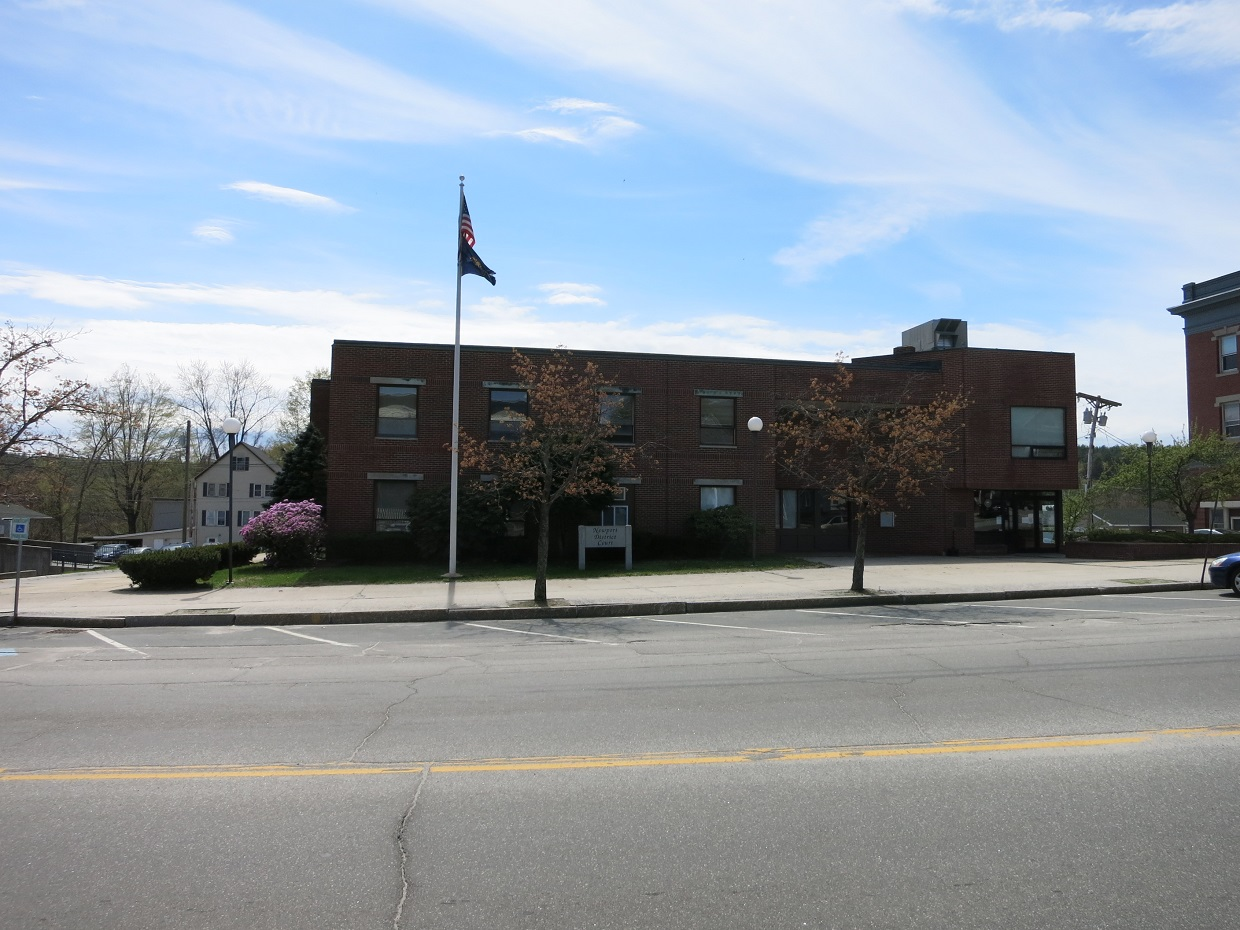
District Court building

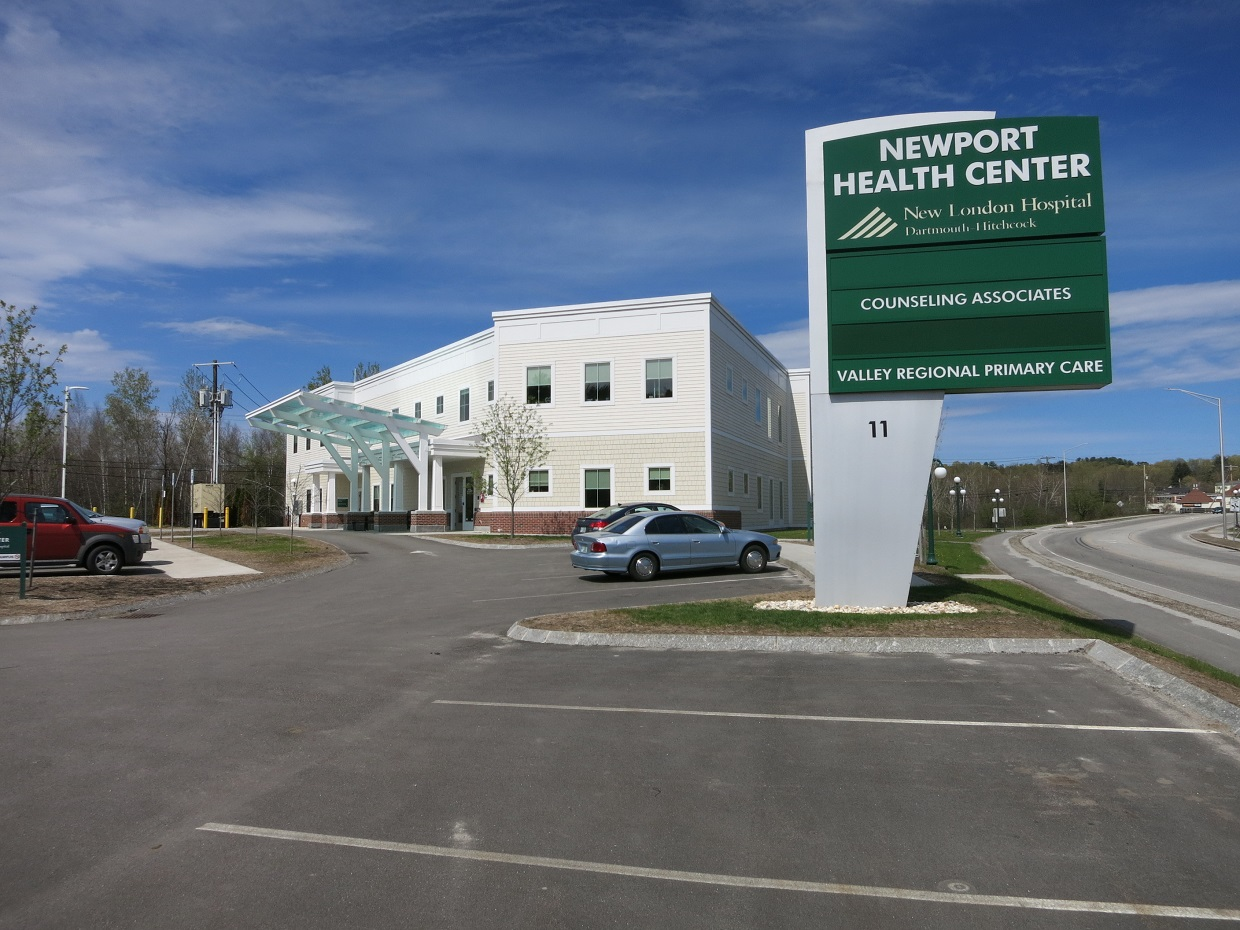
Newport Health Center

== Education ==
Newport's public schools are within the Newport School District. Richards Elementary School educates children from kindergarten through 5th grade. Newport Middle and High Schools educates students from 6th through 12th grades. In fall 2016, 5th and 6th grade students at Towle Elementary were transferred to the other schools. The building is still used for athletics. Within the western region of the town, located is the Newport Montessori School, which is a private school that harbors pre-kindergarten through 8th grade students.

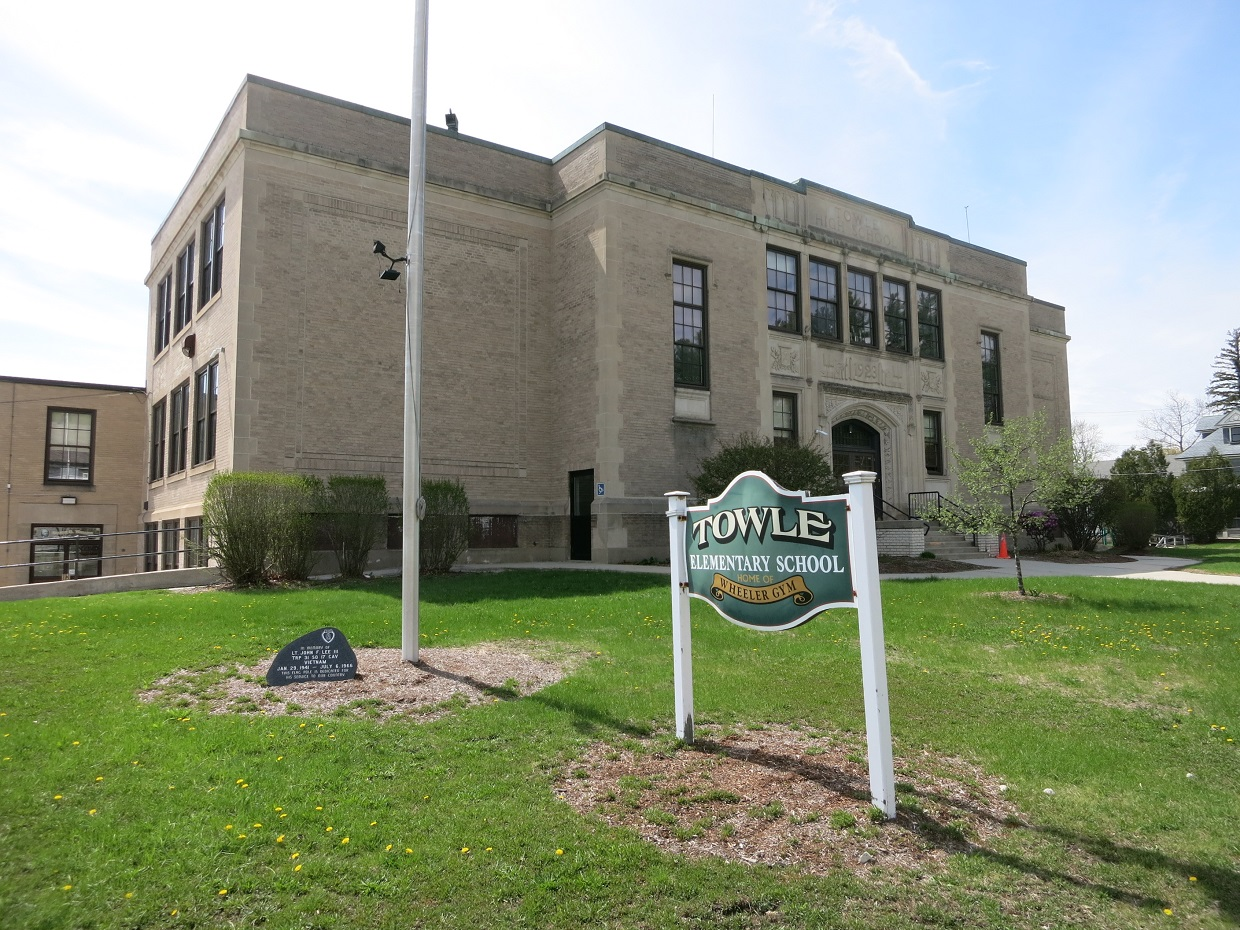
Towle Elementary School

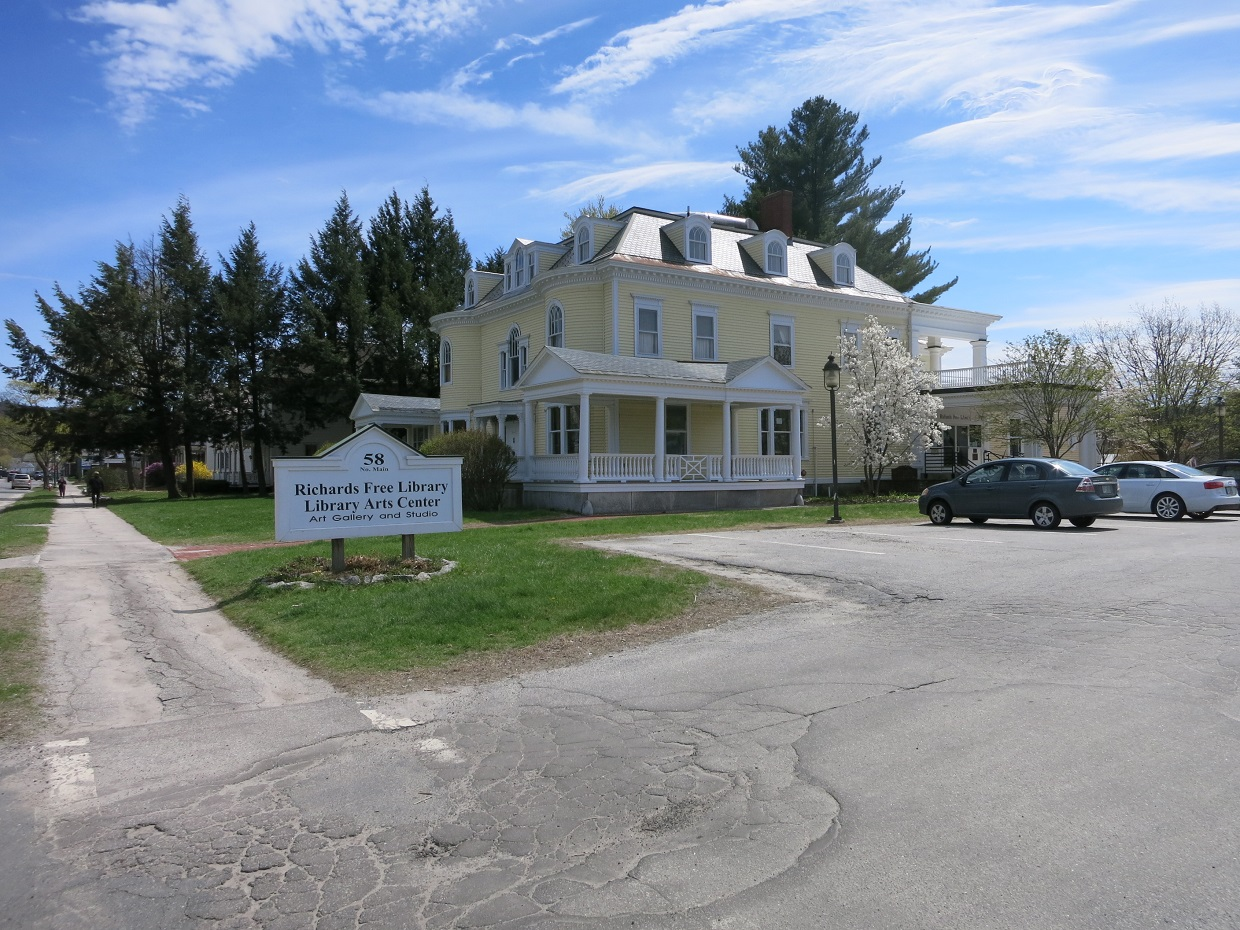
Richards Free Library

== Notable people ==
- Henry Albert Baker (1848–1934), 19th-century orthodontist
- George Belknap (1832–1903), US Navy rear admiral
- Edmund Burke (1809–1882), US congressman
- Harry Morrison Cheney (1860–1937), Speaker of the New Hampshire House of Representatives
- Austin Corbin (1827–1896), 19th-century banking and railroad entrepreneur
- Horatio Hale (1817–1896), businessman, ethnologist
- Sarah Josepha Hale (1788–1879), editor, writer
- Evan Hill (1919–2010), journalist, University of Connecticut professor
- Henry Harrison Metcalf (1841–1932), editor, politician, author
- Eugene P. Odum, ecologist known as the "father of modern ecology," recipient of the Tyler Prize for Environmental Achievement
- David Sargent (born 1931), president of Suffolk University
- Edwin Obed Stanard (1832–1914), US congressman
- Mason Weare Tappan (1817–1886), US congressman, state attorney general
- Billy B. Van (1870–1950), vaudeville entertainer
