= Lowdon =

Lowdon is both a surname and a given name. Notable people with the name include:

- Elsie Motz Lowdon (1883–1960), American painter of portrait miniatures
- Graeme Lowdon (born 1965), British businessman
- Syd Lowdon (1936–2017), English rugby league player
- Lowdon Heller (1924–2016), American politician

== See also ==
- Ann Lowdon Call (1945–2007), American equestrian
