= Plainfield Town Hall =

- U.S. National Register of Historic Places
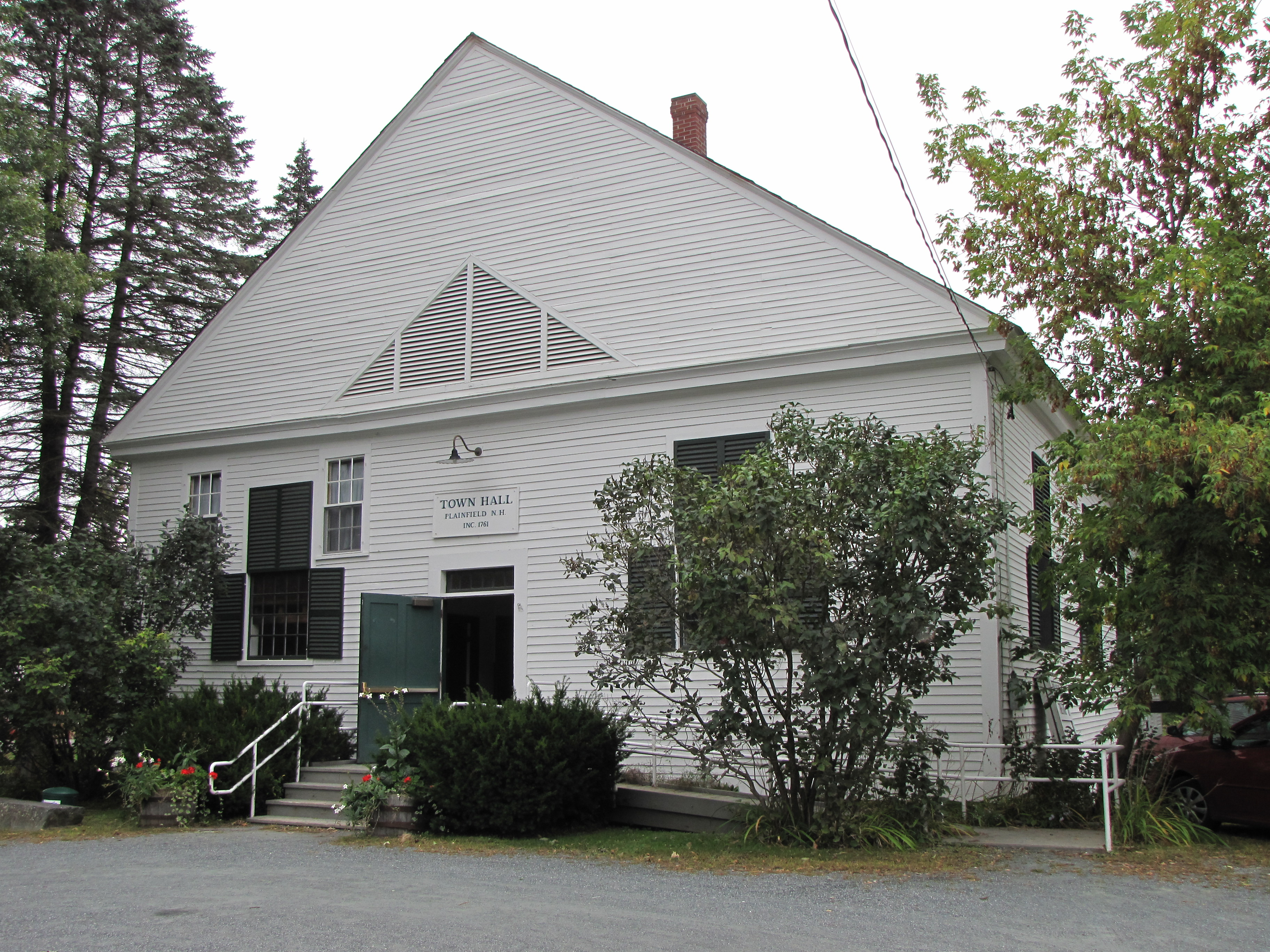
- Plainfield Town Hall

- Location within New Hampshire Location within the United States
- Location: NH 12A, Plainfield, New Hampshire
- Coordinates: 43°32′8″N 72°21′17″W
- Area: 0.4 acres (0.16 ha)
- Built: 1846
- Architect: Parrish, Maxfield; Et al.
- Architectural style: Greek Revival
- NRHP reference No.: 85001200
- Added to NRHP: June 6, 1985

Plainfield Town Hall is one of two town halls in Plainfield, New Hampshire. This town hall stands on New Hampshire Route 12A, north of its junction with Daniels Road. Built in 1846 using timber from an earlier town hall, it is a good example of vernacular Greek Revival architecture. It is further notable for the artwork on its stage backdrop, executed by Maxfield Parrish. The building was listed on the National Register of Historic Places in 1985.

== Description and history ==
Plainfield Town Hall is located in the village center of Plainfield, on the east side of NH 12A. It is a single-story wood-frame structure, with a gabled roof and clapboarded exterior. The main facade is three bays wide, with a center entrance flanked by what appear to be tall sash windows, but are in fact 20-light fixed sashes topped by blinds. The left window is itself flanked by high-set smaller sash windows.

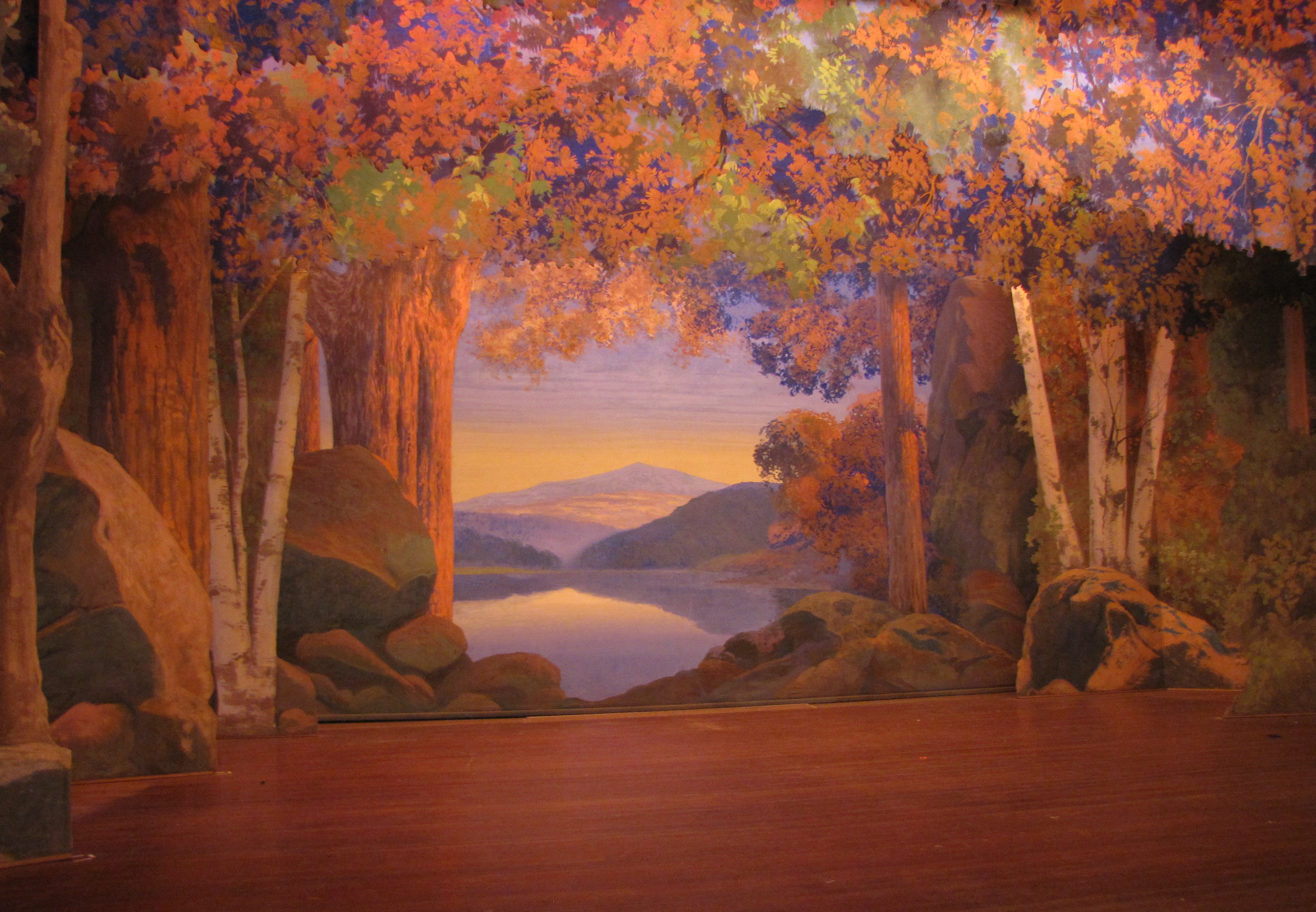
Town Hall Stage

The building was built in three phases, the first occurring in 1846, when the Greek Revival main block, a simple rectangular wood-frame structure with wooden clapboards, was built. In 1916 an addition was made to the rear of the building, increasing its size by about 1/3, in which a stage and theatrical facilities were added. This section is particularly notable for the stage backdrop and wings, which are one of only three known examples of such work decorated by the artist Maxfield Parrish, a resident of Plainfield and a participant in the nearby Cornish Art Colony. A shed addition was later added to the rear of the building.

Governance of Plainfield has traditionally been divided between Plainfield Village and Meriden, where a second 19th-century town hall stands.

The band Okkervil River used the stage as the set of their lyric video for the song "It Was My Season."

== See also ==
- National Register of Historic Places listings in Sullivan County, New Hampshire
