= Meriden Town Hall =

- U.S. National Register of Historic Places
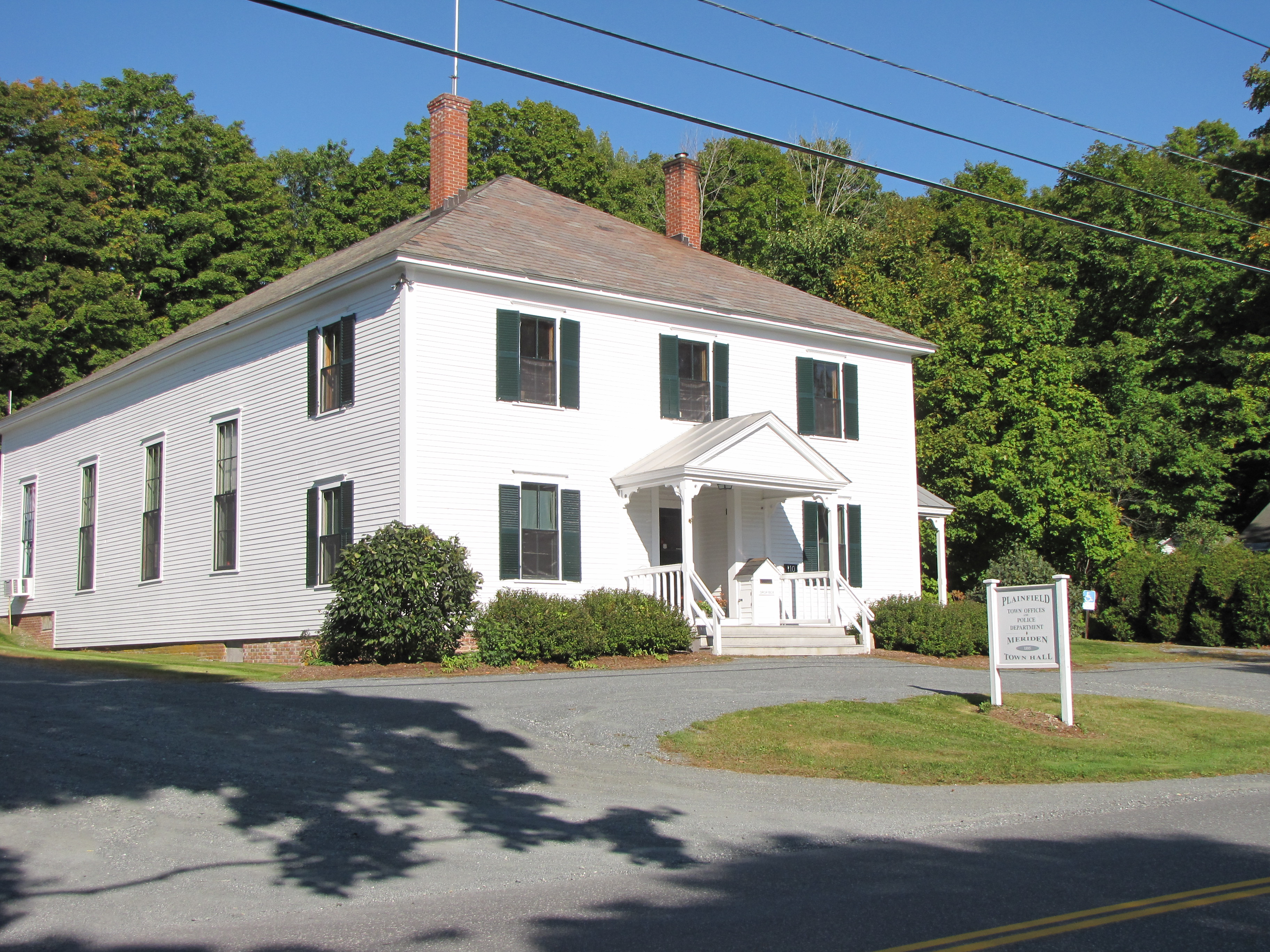

- Location within New Hampshire Location within the United States
- Location: 110 Main St., Plainfield, New Hampshire
- Coordinates: 43°32′53″N 72°15′41″W
- Area: less than one acre
- Built: 1896
- Built by: George Taylor Stockwell
- Architectural style: Colonial Revival
- NRHP reference No.: 98001548
- Added to NRHP: December 24, 1998

Meriden Town Hall is a historic municipal building at 110 Main Street in the Meriden village of Plainfield, New Hampshire. The building, still serving its original function, is the only purpose-built town hall building in Plainfield, whose government is divided between Plainfield village (where Plainfield Town Hall is located) and Meriden. The building was listed on the National Register of Historic Places in 1998.

== Description and history ==
Plainfield's Meriden Town Hall is located on the northern fringe of the village of Meriden, on the northeast side of Main Street. It is a two-story wood-frame structure on a brick foundation, with a clapboarded exterior and hip roof. Its main facade is three bays wide, with double leaf doors sheltered by a gable-roof porch. The side elevations each have six windows, most of which are tall sash. Its principal exterior alterations since construction are the addition of the front porch in 1901, and the addition of a handicapped access ramp aod door to one of the side window bays in 1995.

This town hall was built after the previous meeting house (built 1797), used for both religious and civic functions, was destroyed by fire in 1894. Plainfield's other town hall, was also originally a dual-use meeting house, and was converted to exclusively municipal use in 1846.

== See also ==
- National Register of Historic Places listings in Sullivan County, New Hampshire
