= Henry Brown Fuller =

American painter (1867–1934)

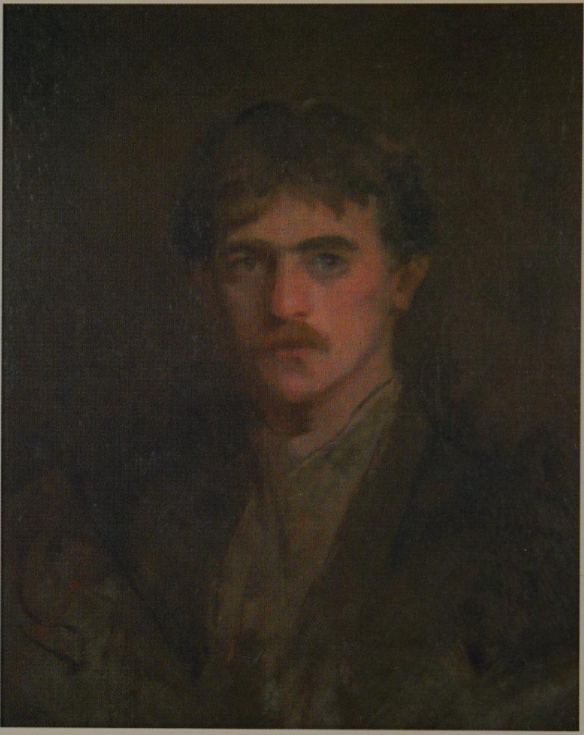
- self-portrait
- Born: 1867
- Died: 1934 (aged 66–67)
- Occupation: Painter
- Spouse(s): Lucia Fairchild Fuller
- Children: Clara Bertram Taylor, Charles Fairchild Fuller
- Parent(s): George Fuller; Agnes Gordon Higginson

Henry Brown Fuller (1867-1934) was an American painter of classical and allegorical works.

== Life and work ==
Fuller was the son of painter George Fuller. He married fellow artist Lucia Fairchild in 1893 and had two children, Charles and Clara. From 1897 onward, he and his family were members of the Cornish Art Colony in Plainfield, New Hampshire. Two of his most famous paintings were done there:

- Illusions (1910), National Museum of American Art, Smithsonian Institution
- The Triumph of Truth Over Error (1907), Principia College, Elsah, Illinois

He was a student of Dennis Miller Bunker at the Cowles Art School in Boston and of William Merritt Chase and Henry Siddons Mowbray at the Art Students League of New York.

Fuller suffered from bouts of severe depression, which contributed to the breakup of his marriage in 1905. In 1906, he was elected into the National Academy of Design as an Associate Academician. He left the Cornish Art Colony to live with his mother in Deerfield, Massachusetts, and died in 1934 in New Orleans.

== Gallery ==
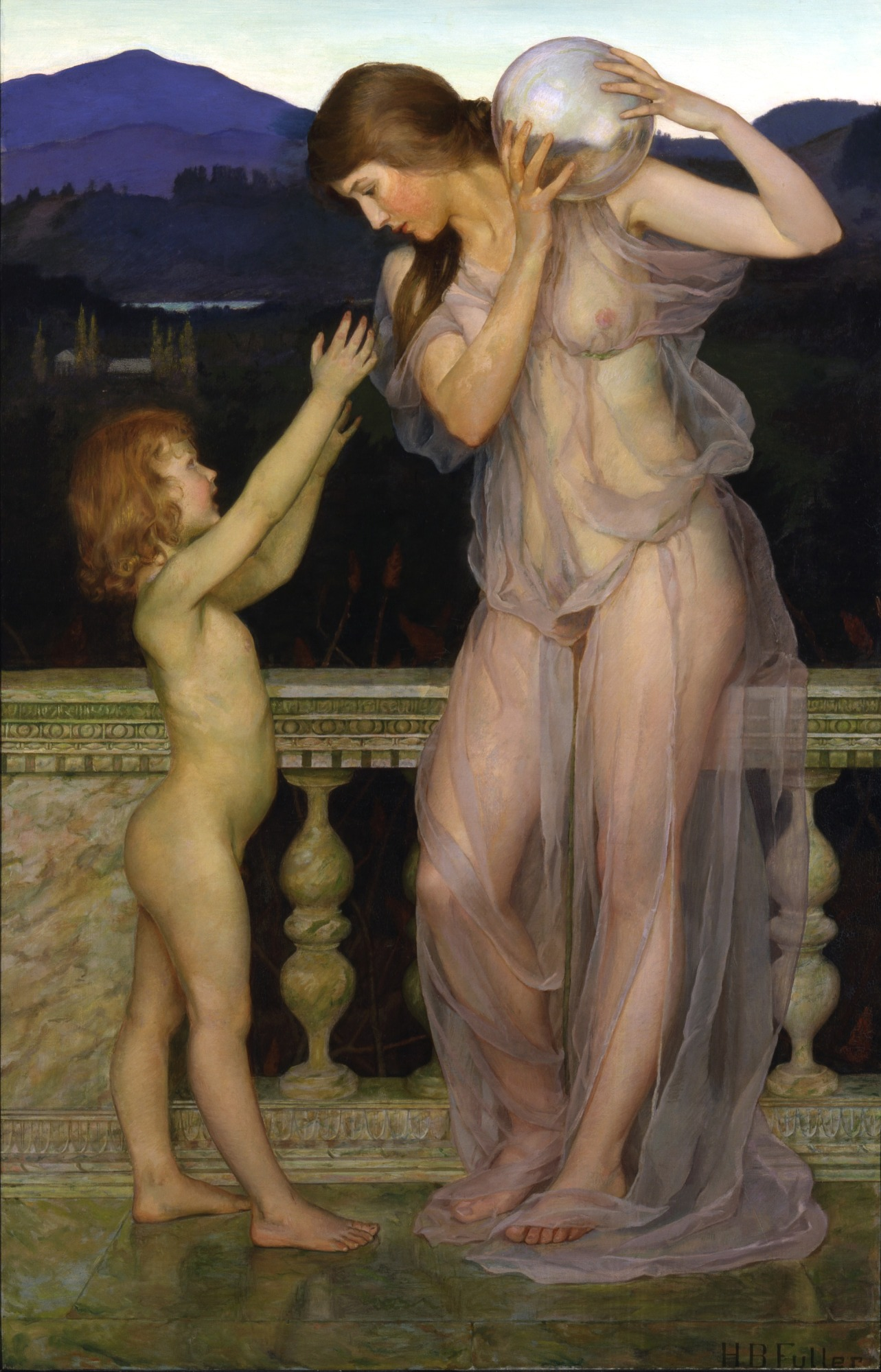
"Illusions"

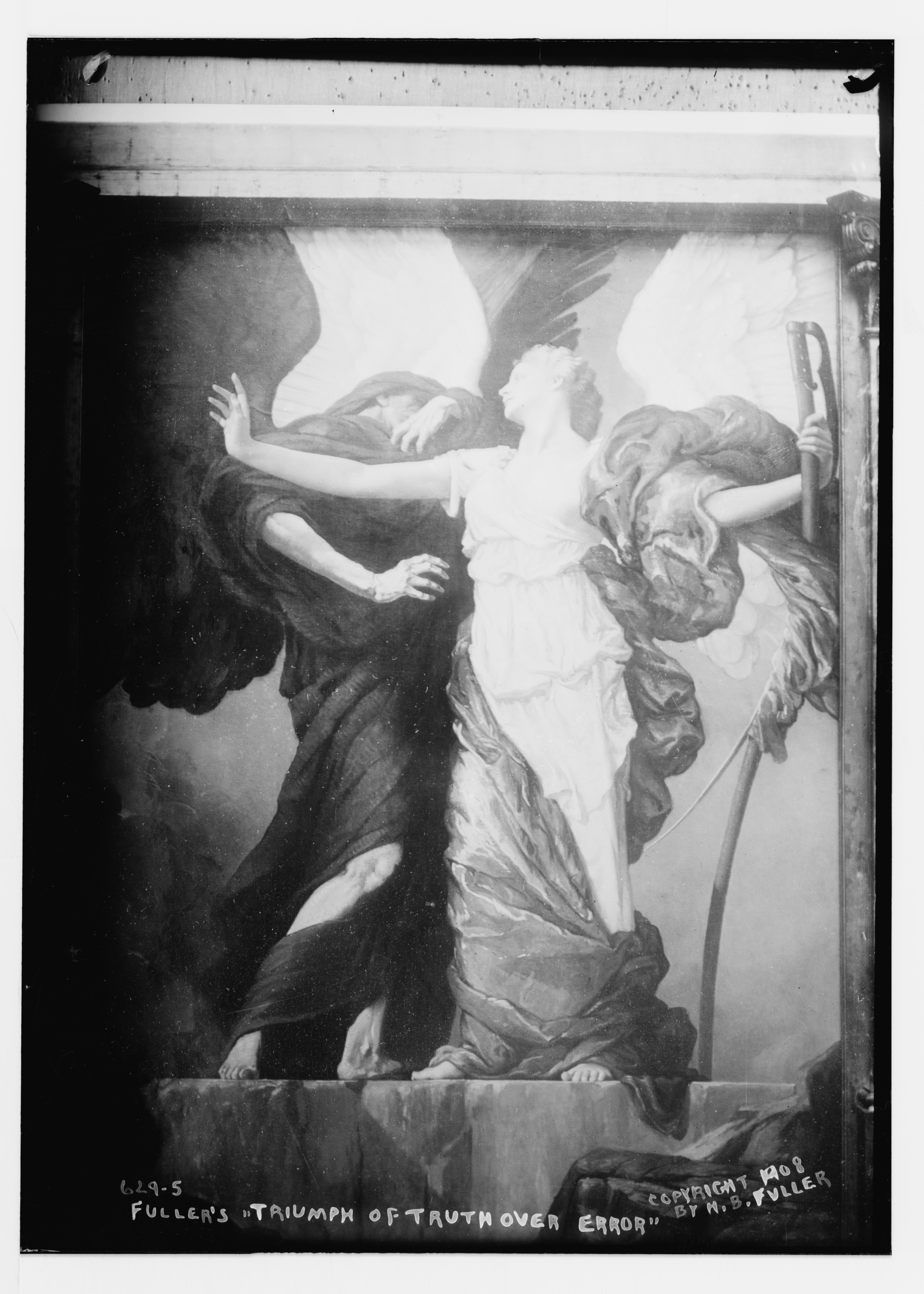
"Triumph of Truth over Error"

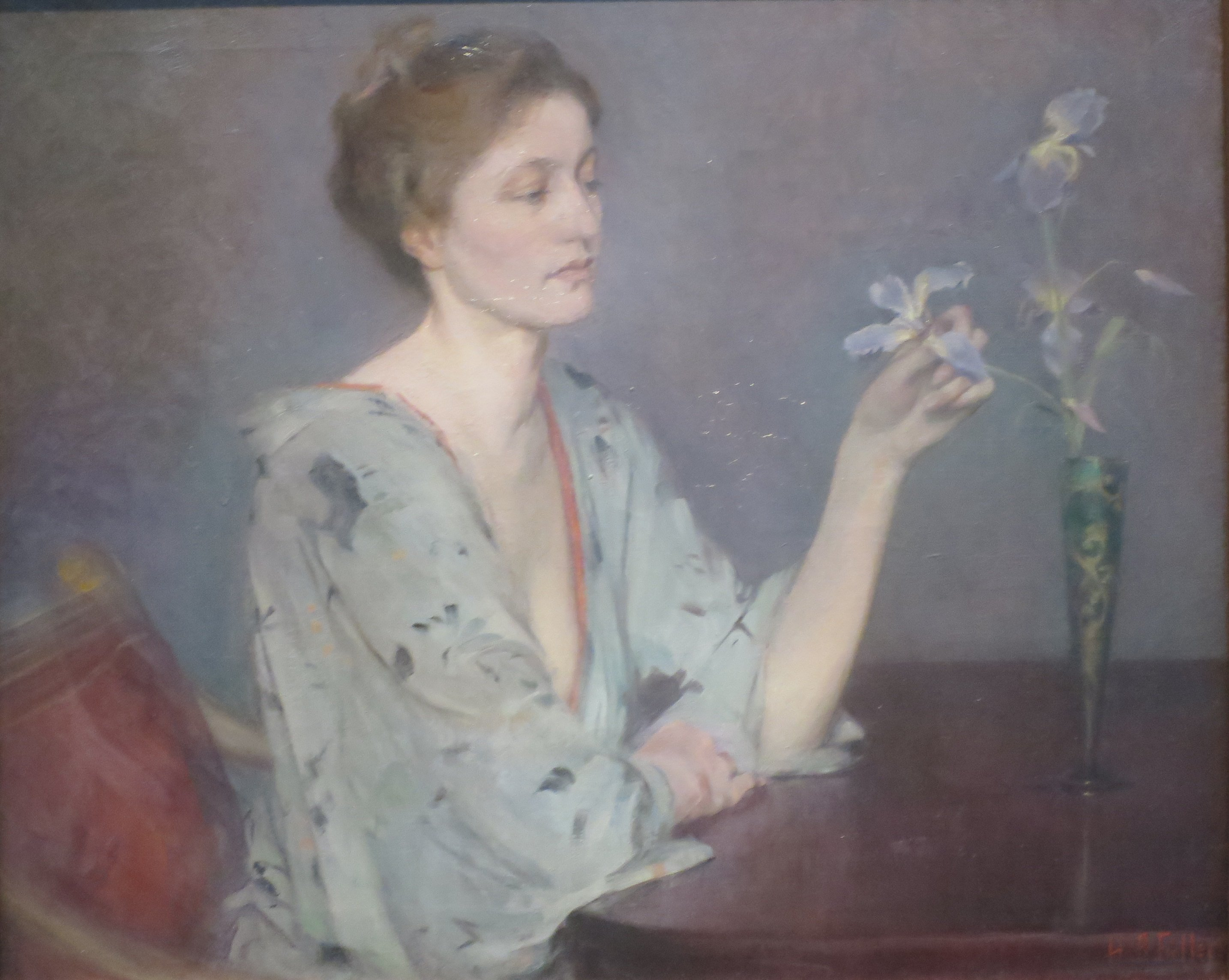
"Ebba Bohm"

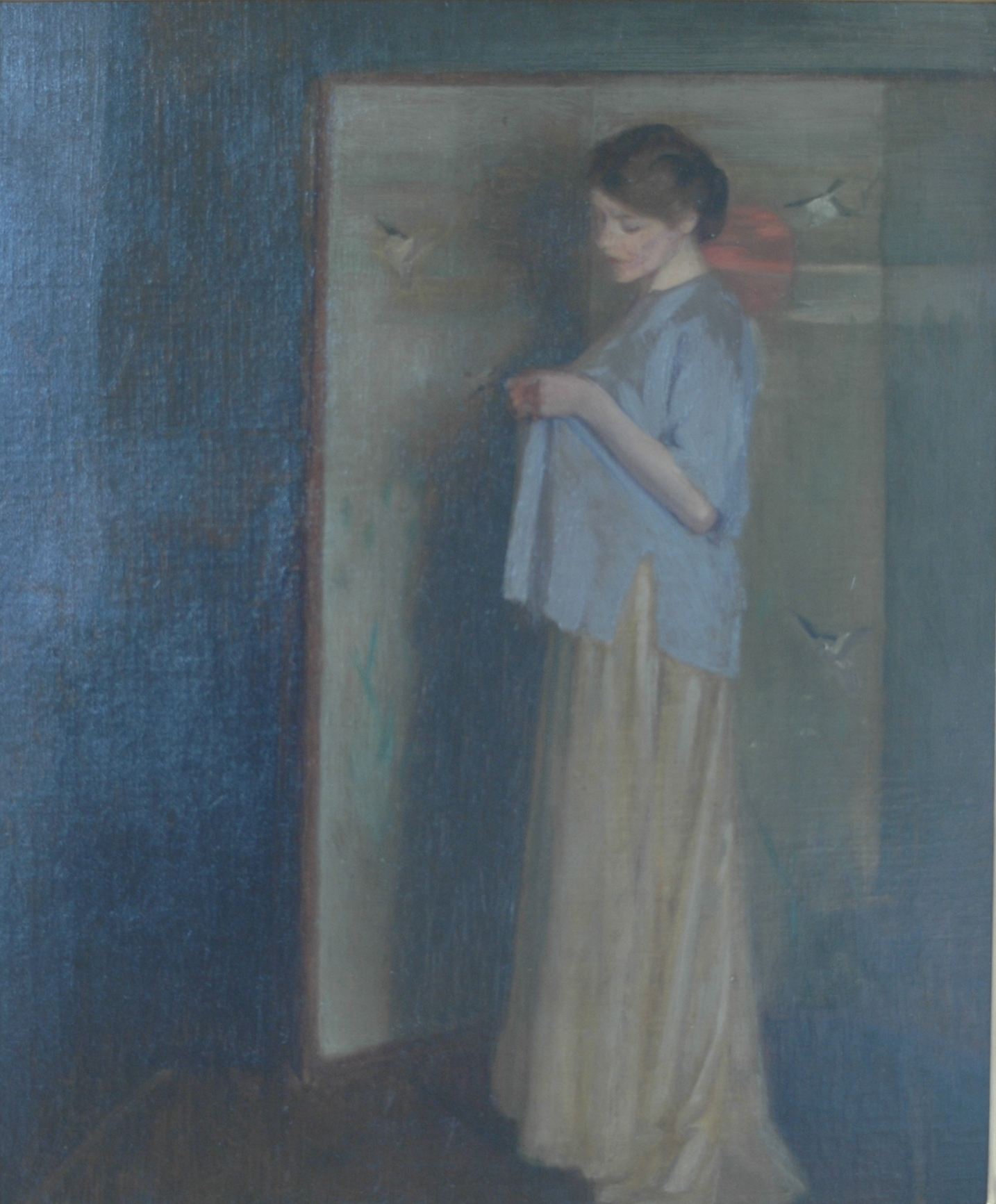
"Getting Ready to Pose"

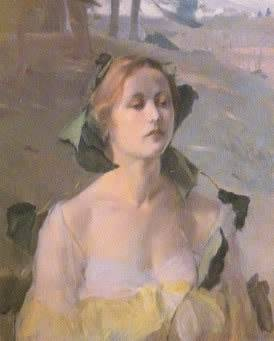
Unknown title
