= Lucia Fairchild Fuller =

American painter

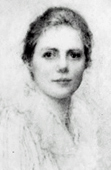
- self-portrait
- Born: Lucia Fairchild; December 6, 1870; Boston, Massachusetts
- Died: May 21, 1924 (aged 53); Madison, Wisconsin
- Known for: Painting
- Spouse: Henry Brown Fuller (m. 1893)
- Parent(s): Elizabeth and Charles Fairchild
- Family: Fairchild family

Lucia Fairchild Fuller (December 6, 1870 – May 21, 1924) was an American painter and member of the New Hampshire Cornish Art Colony. She was inspired to pursue art by John Singer Sargent. Fuller created a mural entitled The Women of Plymouth for the Woman's Building at the World's Columbian Exposition in Chicago in 1893. Best known for her portrait miniatures, she was a founding member and treasurer of the American Society of Miniature Painters.

She was awarded a bronze medal at the Paris Exposition of 1900, a silver medal at Buffalo in 1901, and a gold medal at the Saint Louis Exposition of 1904.

== Early life and education ==
Lucia Fairchild was born in Boston, Massachusetts, the daughter of Elisabeth A. (née Nelson) and Charles Fairchild, who served during President Grover Cleveland's administration as the Secretary of the Treasury Department. Her paternal grandfather was Jairus C. Fairchild, the first Mayor of Madison, Wisconsin, and her uncle was Lucius Fairchild, Governor of Wisconsin.

John Singer Sargent, a family friend, inspired Fairchild to become an artist. She wrote of her recollections of a visit to the Louvre with Sargent. (Note: Fairchild Fuller's recollections are available in manuscript at the Rauner Special Collections Library at Dartmouth College.)

She was educated at Shaw's Private School and the Cowles Art School in Back Bay, Boston, under Dennis Miller Bunker, a friend of Sargent's. She then continued her studies at the Art Students League of New York, under William Merritt Chase and the muralist, Henry Siddons Mowbray. Lydia Emmet was a colleague of hers at the Art Students League in 1889. Fairchild's skill in academic drawing classes at the League has recently been noted.

== Career ==
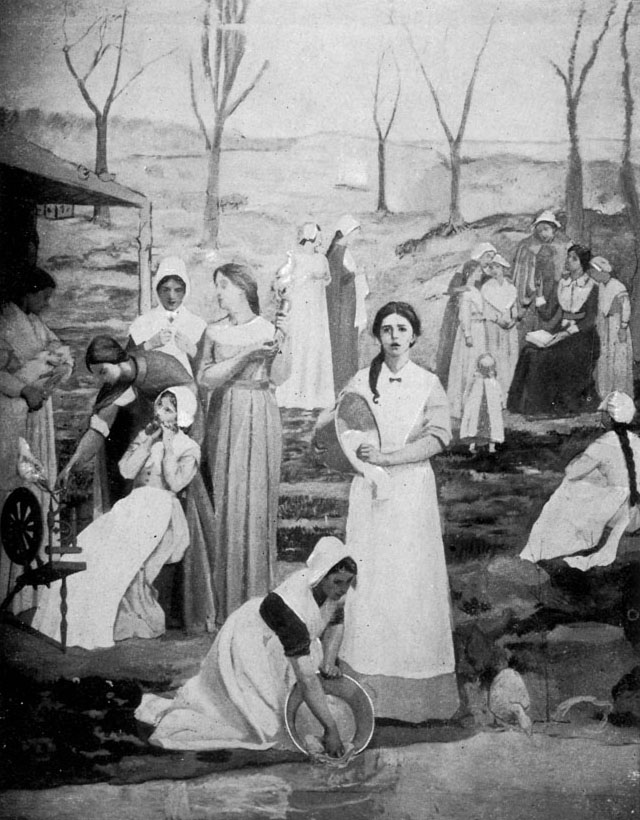
The Women of Plymouth ca. 1893. Oil on canvas, 132 x 144 in. Exhibited at the World's Columbian Exposition, Chicago, IL, 1893, Woman's Building. Blow-Me-Down Grange, Plainfield, NH.

An 1890 self-portrait demonstrates Fairchild's artistic abilities at age 18. She also did a portrait of her brother Blair Fairchild at the piano in 1891. Fairchild intended initially to paint murals, and was commissioned in 1893 to do one of six individual murals for the Woman's Building at the World's Columbian Exposition in Chicago, along with Lydia Emmet, Mary Cassatt, and Mary Fairchild MacMonnies. Her chosen subject was female New England settlers, and was titled The Women of Plymouth. It was considered a significant commission.

After a multi-year love affair, Fairchild married in 1893 her fellow student, the American painter Henry Brown Fuller. After she became pregnant, the immediate need to provide financial support for her family was pressing. Her father had recently lost his fortune in Boston, and she had married against his wishes. Pregnant with her first child, she turned to portraiture, and produced chiefly miniatures. Her husband made it clear he was above the pursuit of money for his art. Fairchild Fuller resorted to living in a dark and small room in New York City, using her significant social connections to contract for commissions, producing nearly two hundred by 1903.

She was awarded a bronze medal at the Paris Exposition of 1900, a silver medal at Buffalo in 1901, and a gold medal at the Saint Louis Exposition of 1904. Five works were at exhibited at the Panama-Pacific International Exhibition in San Francisco in 1915. Fairchild Fuller also exhibited her work in New Hampshire at Dartmouth College in 1916.

In 1899 she was a founding member and treasurer of the American Society of Miniature Painters. She also served as president in 1913. She was an elected member of the National Academy of Design and the Society of American Artists. She maintained memberships with the National Association of Women Artists and the New York Watercolor Club.

== Personal and later life ==
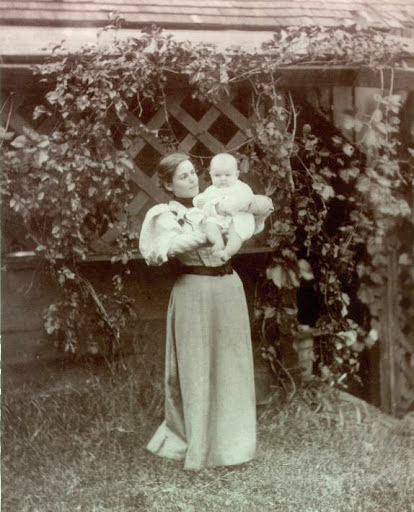
Fairchild Fuller with daughter, Clara Bertram, in 1895

The Fullers had two children, Clara Bertram, born in 1895, and Charles, born in 1897. (Note: A photograph taken of Lucia and Clara posing for Henry Brown Fuller's 1900 painting, Illusions, is included in the large collection of Fairchild Fuller papers at Dartmouth College. The final painting includes the figures of Lucia and Clara in the foreground, barely clad, and Mount Ascutney, with one of the many newly built Cornish Colony homes, in the background.) In 1897, they purchased a home in Plainfield, New Hampshire, and were active members of the Cornish Art Colony. (Note: After a devastating fire in 1899, they rebuilt the main house and added tennis courts and a swimming pool.) Fairchild Fuller's brother, "Jack" John Cummings Fairchild, married the painter Francis C. Lyons Houston's daughter, Charlotte Fairchild, in 1898.

The couple became estranged in 1901. Fairchild Fuller was portrayed in a 1902 painting, variously titled The Spinet, or Lady and Spinet, or Lady Playing Harpsichord, or Portrait of Lucia, by Cornish Colony founder and painter, Thomas Wilmer Dewing. Dewing executed a nearly identical "partner" painting of her that summer. In 1905, Fairchild Fuller became separated from her husband, who returned to his family home in Deerfield, Massachusetts to live with his mother, Agnes Higginson Fuller. They remained owners of their home in Plainfield, and continued to spend time in the area, often renting the home to other artists, including Ethel Barrymore and the Zorachs.

In 1905, Fairchild Fuller painted a second self-portrait, In the Looking Glass, a 6 x 4 inch watercolor on ivory, wherein she depicted herself as a mature woman with eyeglasses, looking directly at the viewer. The work, owned by Fairchild Fuller's family, was included in the 1987 publication American Women Artists, 1830-1930, by Eleanor Tufts, one of the first publications by the newly opened National Museum of Women in the Arts. Fairchild Fuller moved to New York City, where she taught at the Art Students League in the years 1910-11 and 1914-15. The only school specializing in miniature painting in New York City, The American School of Miniature Painting, operated from 1914 to 1924. Fairchild Fuller taught alongside the artist Elsie D. Pattee and trained the Texan artist Elsie Motz Lowdon.

In 1920, Fairchild Fuller published an article about her friend from the Cornish Art Colony, the sculptor, Frances Grimes. They were the same age, had arrived in Cornish about the same time, and had shared a decade of experience in the Cornish Colony.

Fairchild Fuller's recurrent illness forced her to return to her father's family hometown, Madison, Wisconsin in 1918. She died there of multiple sclerosis on May 21, 1924, at the age of 51.

== Gallery ==
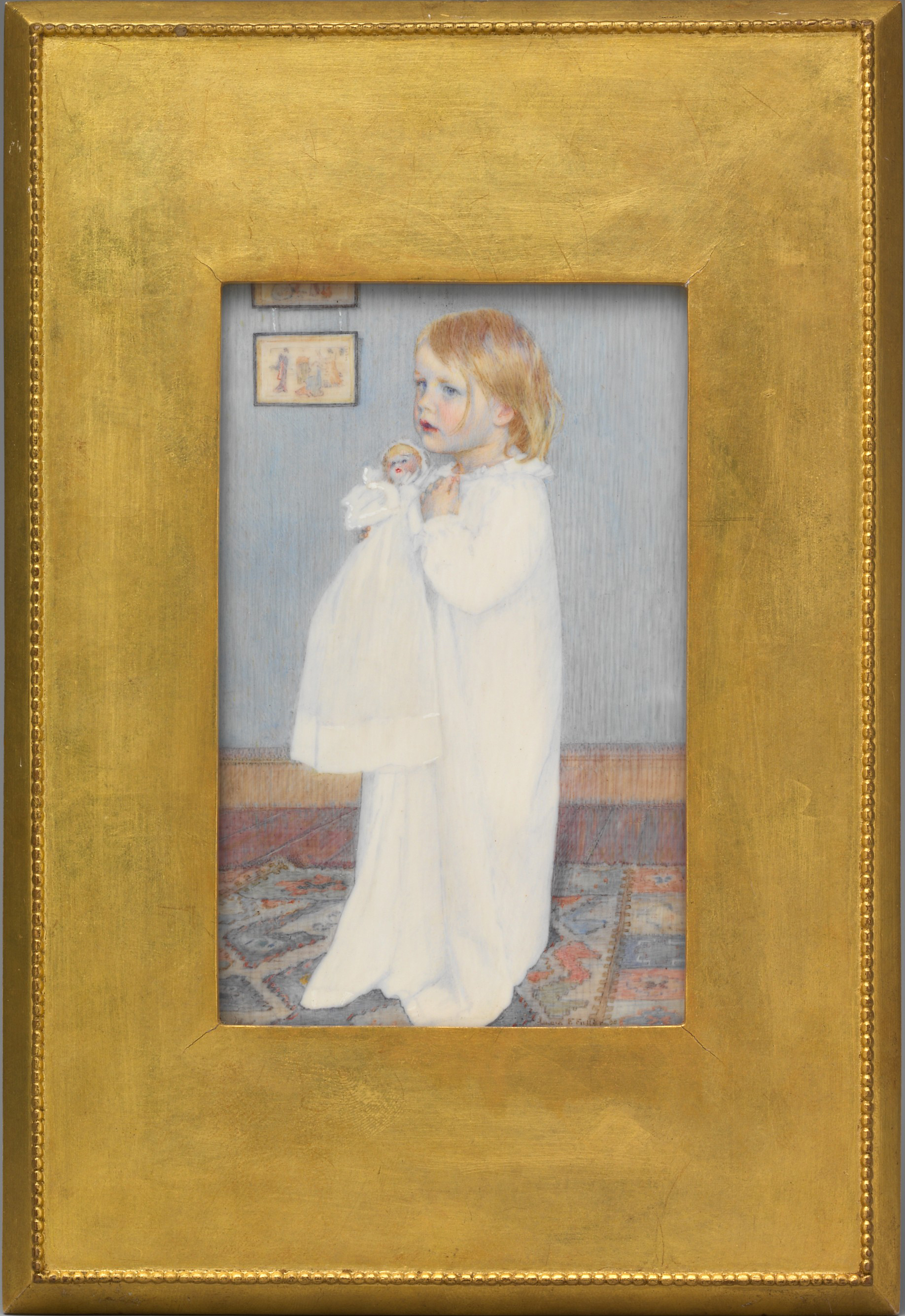
Clara B. Fuller. 1898. Watercolor on ivory. 4 1/2 x 2 13/16 in. Metropolitan Museum of Art

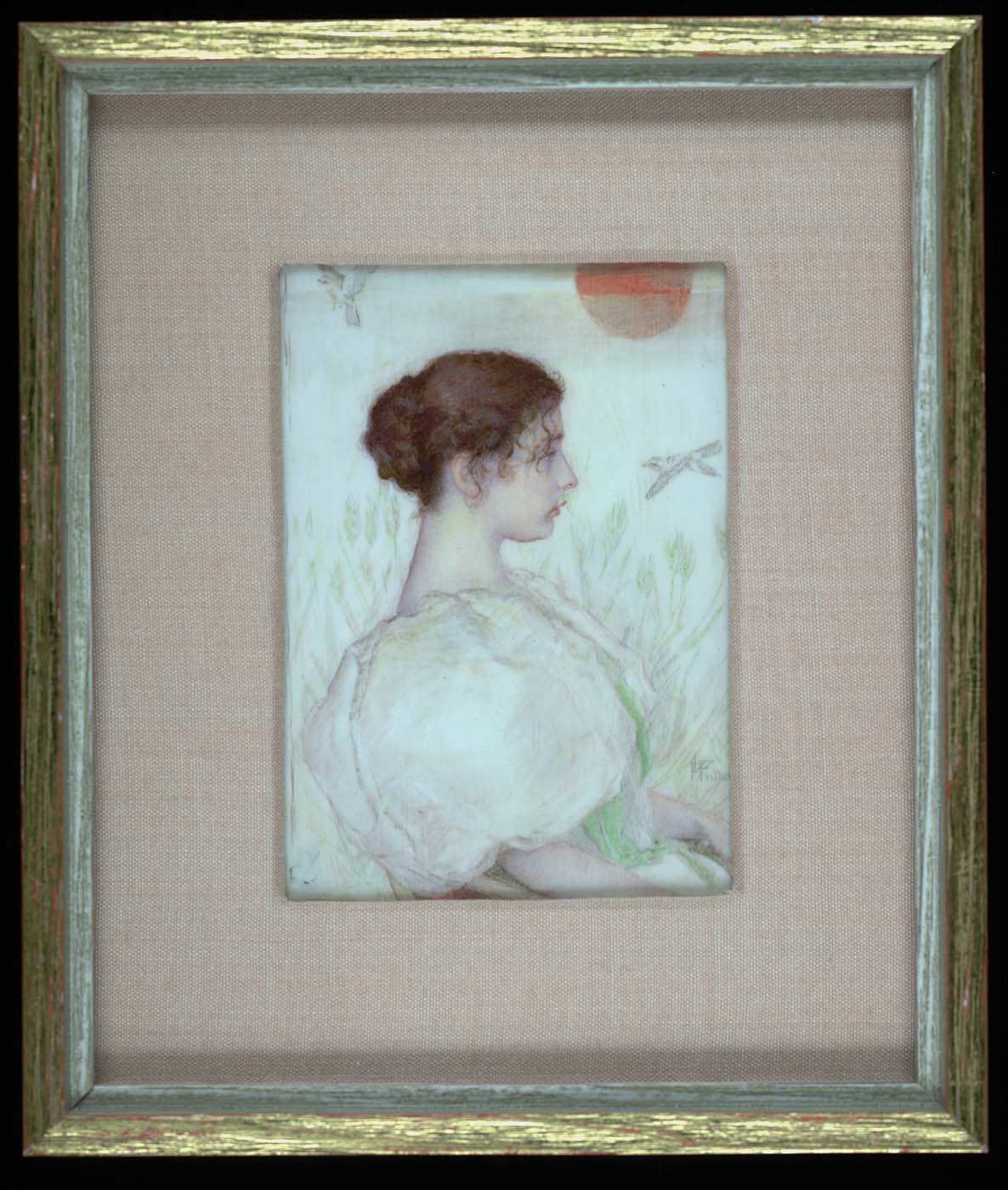
Head of a Young Girl. ca. 1900. Watercolor on ivory. 3 1/4 x 2 3/8 in. Smithsonian American Art Museum

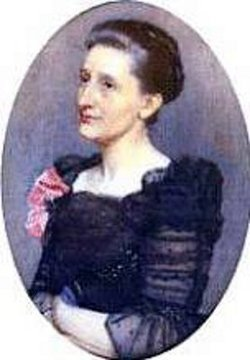
Hettie Sherman Evarts Beaman. ca. 1901. Miniature on ivory

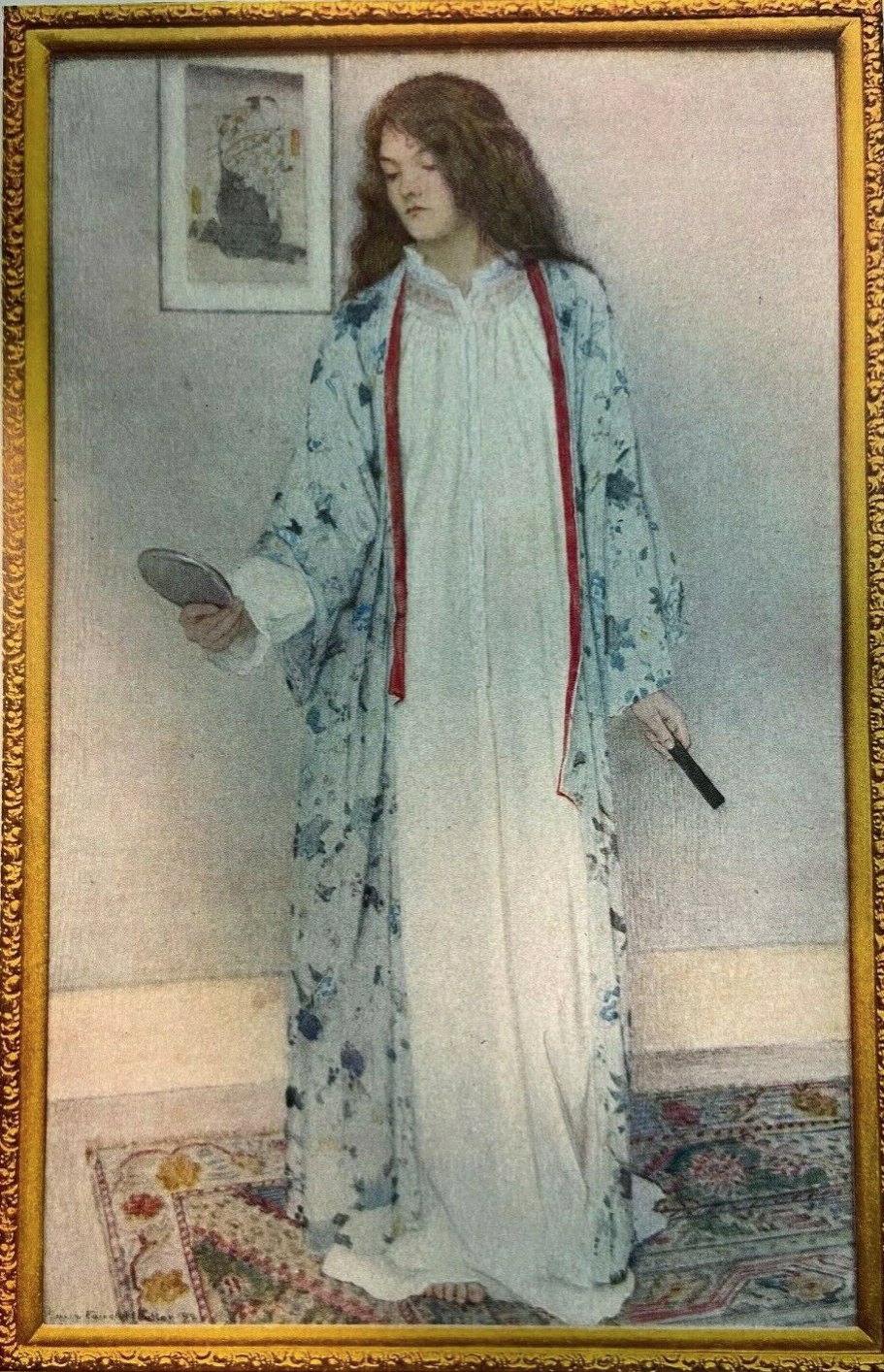
Girl with hand glass ca. 1903. Reproduction as published 1912.

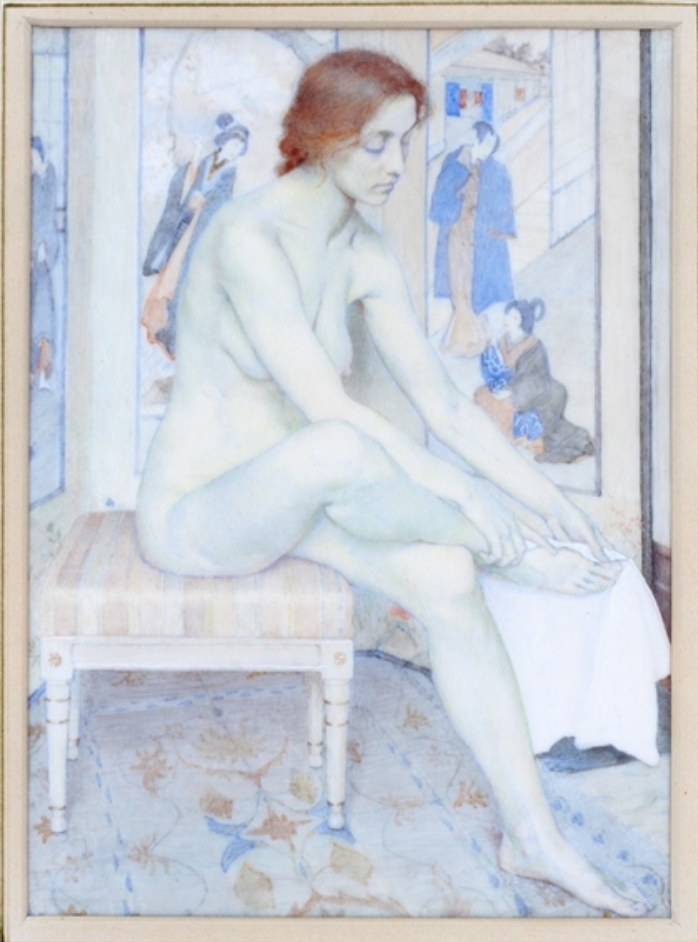
Girl drying her feet ca. 1903 Watercolor on paper. 5 3/4 x 4 1/4 in.

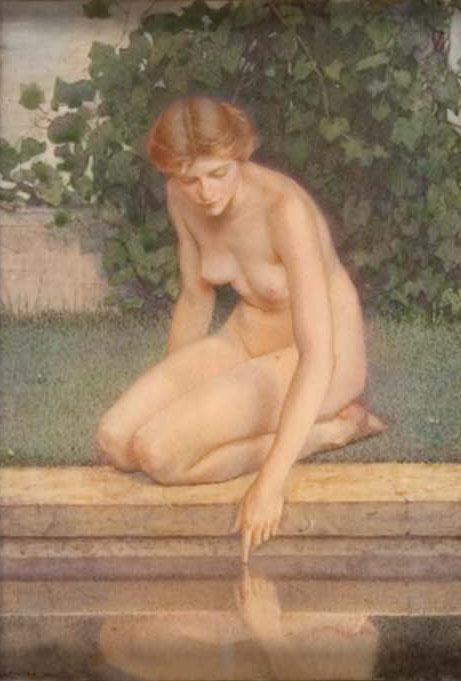
By a Clear Fountain 1907. Watercolor on ivory. 6 1/4 x 4 3/8 in. Smithsonian American Art Museum
