= George Fuller (painter) =

American painter

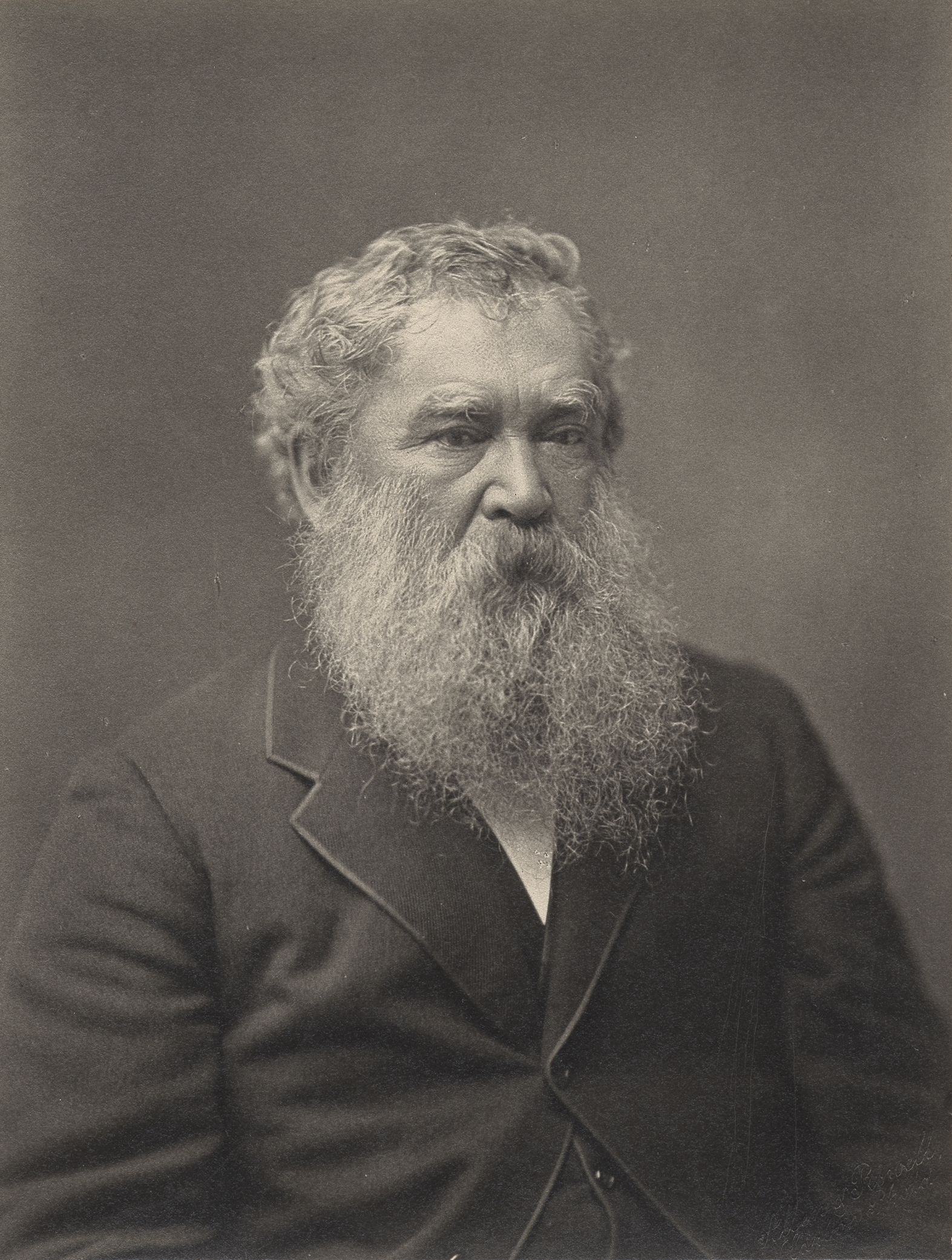
- Born: January 17, 1822; Deerfield, Massachusetts
- Died: March 21, 1884 (aged 62); Brookline, Massachusetts
- Known for: Painting
- Children: Henry Brown Fuller

George Fuller (January 17, 1822 – March 21, 1884) was an American figure and portrait painter.

== Biography ==
Fuller was born in Deerfield, Massachusetts. His father, Aaron Fuller, was a farmer. His mother was Aaron's second wife, Fanny Negus of Petersham, Massachusetts. His parents were not in favor of Fuller becoming a painter. At age thirteen, he went to Boston, Massachusetts to work for a grocer, then tried selling shoes before giving up on this also and returning home. A year or so later, he went to Illinois with a survey team for the railroad, and continued working with the survey team for a couple of years. Fuller then returned home once again, entered Deerfield Academy, and began to paint in his spare time.

In 1841, his desire to paint overcame his parents' opposition. He joined his half-brother Augustus as an itinerant painter, and enjoyed some success painting portraits in northern New York. That winter he went to Albany where he studied painting with Henry Kirke Brown for nine months. The next two winters, he studied painting with the Boston Artists' Association, working on the family farm in the summers. In 1846 he sold A Nun at Confession for six dollars. In 1847, he enrolled in the National Academy of Design in New York. He spent most of the next ten years in New York. Some winters he spent in the southern United States painting portraits and scenes about local life. Friends included painter E.T. Billings, with whom he travelled in the south. In 1857, he was elected an associate of the National Academy of Design.

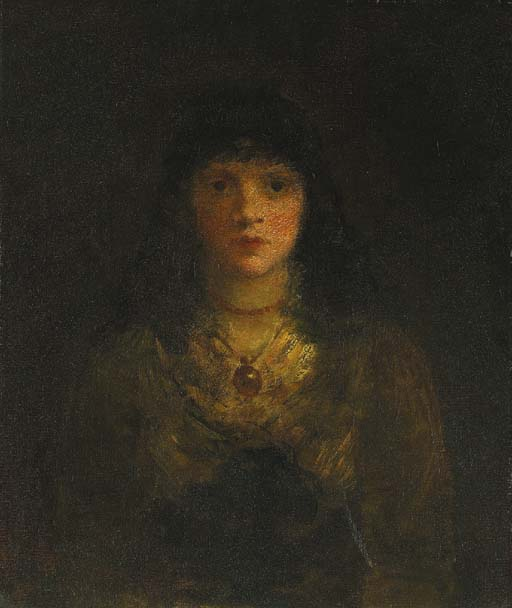
The Quadroon (study) by Fuller

His father died in 1859, and he became aware that he would eventually need to return to the family farm to support his family. In January 1860 he began five month a tour of Europe with friends during which they visited London, Paris, Florence, Rome, and Venice. He married Agnes Higginson of Cambridge, Massachusetts in 1861 and brought her home to the Deerfield farm. For the next fifteen years, he worked the farm and painted in his spare time in a studio converted from a carriage house. His farm failed in 1875, and he turned to painting for his livelihood.

In the spring of 1876, the opening of his first art exhibition relaunched his career as a painter. In 1878 the National Academy exhibition included his Turkey Pasture in Kentucky and By the Wayside. The following year he sent to the Academy And She Was a Witch and The Romany Girl. He sent more pictures to the Academy in 1881 as his reputation and commercial success grew.

In 1878, Fuller showed the oil painting, Reapers Resting, as his first exhibit at the Boston Art Club. Subsequently, at the Boston Art Club, he exhibited one oil painting, Head, in 1880; one oil painting, Portrait of Miss A___ in 1881; three oil paintings: Study Head, Portrait of Miss F., and Maidenhood, at the 1882 Boston Art Club exhibition; and the final oil painting he exhibited at the Club, Portrait of Miss C., was January 19–February 16, 1884.

His work continued to enjoy success until his death at his home in Brookline, Massachusetts on March 21, 1884, of kidney disease. A memorial exhibition of his works was held at the Boston Museum of Fine Arts in 1884.

Examples of Fuller's work reside in the collections of the Museum of Fine Arts in Boston and the Metropolitan Museum of Art in New York.

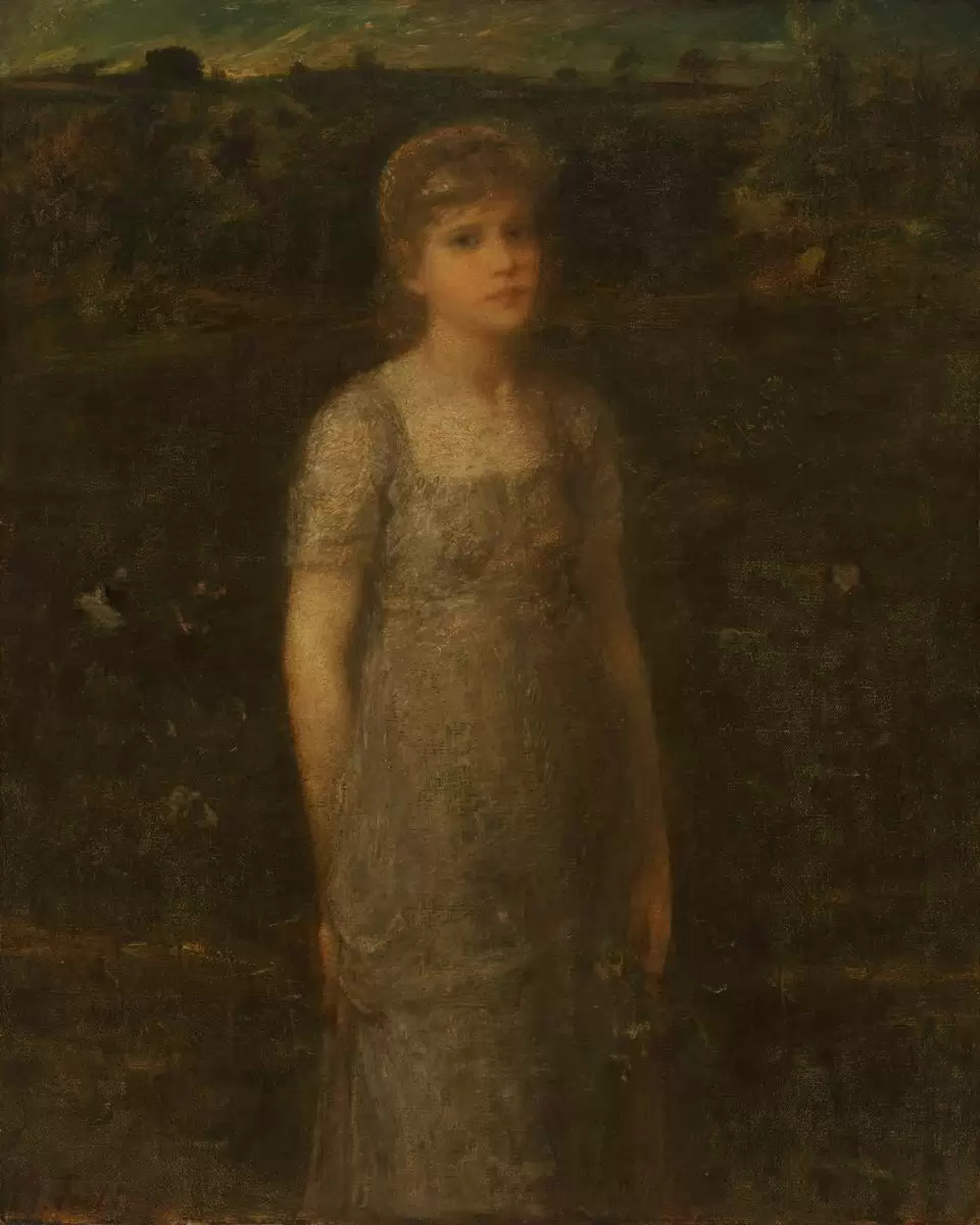
Winifred Dysart (1881)

== Works ==
- Hannah, 1879, oil on canvas, The Nelson-Atkins Museum of Art, Kansas City, Missouri
- The Plains Between "The Bars" and South Deerfield, c. 1836-1838, oil on canvas, Addison Gallery of American Art, Andover, Massachusetts
- Cupid, 1854
- "The Birdcatcher", 1880, oil on canvas The University of Arizona Museum of Art, Tucson, Arizona
- Negro Nurse with Child, 1861
- At the Bars, 1865
- Ideal Head of a Boy (George Spencer Fuller), c. 1867–1873, oil on canvas, Metropolitan Museum of Art New York City
- By the Wayside, 1877, Museum of Fine Arts, Boston
- The Romany Girl, 1877-1879, oil on canvas, Addison Gallery of American Art, Andover, Massachusetts
- Shearing the Donkey, 1877-1879
- And She Was a Witch, 1877–1884, oil on canvas, Metropolitan Museum of Art New York City
- Turkey Pasture in Kentucky, 1878
- The Dandelion Girl, 1879
- The Quadroon, 1880, oil on canvas, Metropolitan Museum of Art New York City
- The Gathering of Simples, 1880
- Sketch of the Deerfield Valley, c. 1880-1884, chalk on blue-grey wove paper, Addison Gallery of American Art, Andover, Massachusetts
- Portrait of Mary C. Hardy as a Child, 1881, oil on canvas, Addison Gallery of American Art, Andover, Massachusetts
- Winifred Dysart, 1881, Worcester Art Museum, Worcester, Massachusetts
- Hoeing Tobacco, Worcester Art Museum, Worcester, Massachusetts
- Nydia, 1882, oil on canvas, Metropolitan Museum of Art New York City
- Priscilla Fauntleroy, 1882
- Psyche, 1882
- November, 1882-1884
- Fedalma, 1883-1884, oil on canvas, Smithsonian American Art Museum, Washington, D.C.
- Arethusa, 1884, Museum of Fine Arts, Boston
- A Nun at Confession
- Boy and Bird
- Girl with a Calf
- Ideal Head, oil on canvas, Smithsonian American Art Museum, Washington, D.C.
- Reapers Resting
