= Hollis Smith =

Canadian politician

Hollis Smith (June 24, 1800 – March 29, 1863) was a businessman and political figure in Canada East, now part of the Canadian province of Quebec.

Smith was born in Plainfield, New Hampshire and grew up in Hatley Township in Lower Canada. He settled near Lennoxville, first as a farmer, then later opening a general store.

He then opened stores at Compton and Eaton (now part of Cookshire-Eaton). He also acquired land and worked with Alexander Tilloch Galt of the British American Land Company to build a road to open up access to the Eastern Townships.

Smith supported the Montreal Annexation Manifesto of 1849. He helped establish Bishop's College and was a partner in the St. Lawrence and Atlantic Railroad and the Sherbrooke Cotton Factory.

In 1856, he moved his residence to Sherbrooke, where he was secretary for the Mutual Fire Insurance Company. In 1856, he was elected to the Legislative Council of the Province of Canada for Wellington district. Originally a Liberal, he declared himself an Independent in 1857 and a Conservative in 1858.

He died in Sherbrooke, after an attack of apoplexy.

His daughter Susan Selina married Alexander Manning, a mayor of Toronto.
