= Charlotte Fairchild =

American photographer

Charlotte Fairchild (1876–1927) was an American photographer. Married to wealthy Bostonian John Cummings Fairchild in 1898, she initially had no interest in becoming an artist. However, after the sudden death of her husband in 1915, she had to support her three children, and needed a career. She moved to New York to start her successful art career as a photographer.

The New York Times featured a series of her photos on October 20, 1918 in support of a patriotic World War I campaign. The publicity brought Fairchild to national acclaim as a photographer. The artist’s photos could be found in theatre and fashion magazines alike, including Vogue and Vanity Fair. Her society portraits included Broadway stars such as Ethel Barrymore, Ina Clare and Irene Bordoni.

In 1927, Fairchild married Colonel Arthur Little, and moved with him to Wyoming. She died the same year on her husband’s ranch. The music for the funeral procession was provided by The Kentucky Choir led by notable African-American Noble Sissle. The Fairchild photography company left behind after Charlotte Fairchild’s passing continued to run into the 1930s. Multiple articles featured the tapestries, art objects, and furniture that were sold from her estate at an estimated 30,000 dollars.
