= Plainfield (CDP), New Hampshire =

Census-designated place in New Hampshire, United States

Plainfield, New Hampshire
- Census-designated place
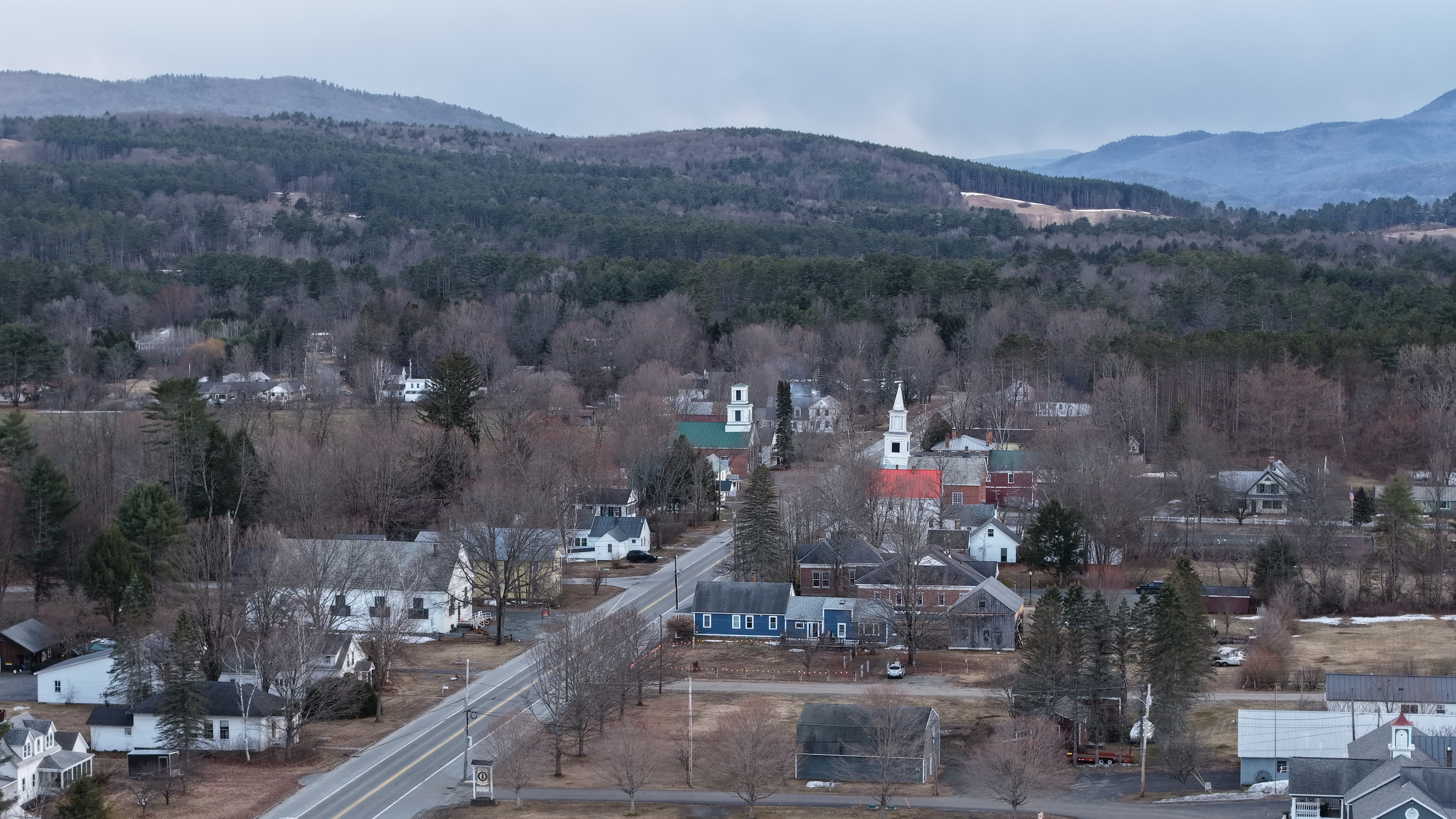
- Plainfield, New Hampshire, from the north

- Location within New Hampshire Location within the United States
- Coordinates: 43°32′04″N 72°21′13″W
- Country: United States
- State: New Hampshire
- County: Sullivan
- Town: Plainfield

Area
  - Total: 0.58 sq mi (1.50 km^{2})
  - Land: 0.58 sq mi (1.50 km^{2})
  - Water: 0 sq mi (0.00 km^{2})
- Elevation: 535 ft (163 m)

Population (2020)
  - Total: 178
  - Density: 308.1/sq mi (118.95/km^{2})
- Time zone: UTC-5 (Eastern (EST))
  - Summer (DST): UTC-4 (EDT)
- ZIP code: 03781
- Area code: 603
- FIPS code: 33-62260
- GNIS feature ID: 2629737

Plainfield is a census-designated place (CDP) and the namesake village in the town of Plainfield, New Hampshire, United States. The population of the CDP was 178 at the 2020 census, out of 2,459 in the entire town.

== Geography ==
The CDP is in the western part of the town of Plainfield, along New Hampshire Route 12A, which leads north 7 miles (11 km) to Interstate 89 in West Lebanon and south 5 miles (8 km) to the Cornish–Windsor Covered Bridge over the Connecticut River. The Plainfield CDP is bordered to the west by Clay Brook and to the east by Blow-me-down Brook, a southwestward-flowing tributary of the Connecticut. The southern end of the CDP is at the confluence of the two brooks, and the northern end is at Stage Road and NH 12A.

According to the U.S. Census Bureau, the CDP has a total area of 0.58 square miles (1.5 km^{2}), all land.

== Demographics ==
Historical population
Census	Pop.	Note	%±
2010	205		—
2020	178		−13.2%
U.S. Decennial Census

As of the census of 2010, there were 205 people, 87 households, and 56 families residing in the CDP. There were 91 housing units, of which 4, or 4.4%, were vacant. The racial makeup of the CDP was 98.0% white, 0.5% African American, 1.0% Asian, and 0.5% from two or more races. 0.5% of the population were Hispanic or Latino of any race.

Of the 87 households in the CDP, 27.6% had children under the age of 18 living with them, 52.9% were headed by married couples living together, 4.6% had a female householder with no husband present, and 35.6% were non-families. 25.3% of all households were made up of individuals, and 11.5% were someone living alone who was 65 years of age or older. The average household size was 2.36, and the average family size was 2.88.

20.0% of residents in the CDP were under the age of 18, 5.9% were from age 18 to 24, 21.5% were from 25 to 44, 34.2% were from 45 to 64, and 18.5% were 65 years of age or older. The median age was 46.8 years. For every 100 females, there were 103.0 males. For every 100 females age 18 and over, there were 102.5 males.

For the period 2011–15, the estimated median annual income for a household was $127,813, and the median income for a family was $97,500. The per capita income for the CDP was $37,137.
