= Edwin Tryon Billings =

American painter (1824–1893)

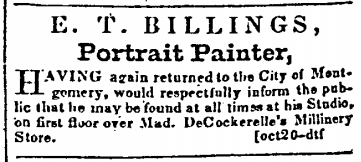
Advertisement for E. T. Billings, Montgomery, Alabama, 1851

Edwin Tryon Billings (1824–1893) was an American portrait painter who spent most of his career in Massachusetts. Among his numerous portrait subjects were Daniel Webster, William Lloyd Garrison and Oliver Wendell Holmes Sr.

== Biography ==
Billings was born November 20, 1824, to wheelwright Ira Billings and Eunice Tryon of Massachusetts. He lived in Montgomery, Alabama, intermittently c. 1850–1859; and in Worcester, Massachusetts, c. 1854–1856. He "first visited Worcester in 1854. Billings painted several important Worcester residents, including John Davis and Stephen Salisbury. His work hung in many public buildings including the Worcester County Courthouse and Mechanics Hall."

He moved to Boston in the 1860s, working in the Studio Building on Tremont Street c. 1864–1891. In the 1874 exhibition of the Massachusetts Charitable Mechanic Association, Billings showed several paintings, including "Child and Kitten," and "Children and Rabbits." His work also appeared in the 1887 National Academy of Design exhibit.

Billings married Frances E. Keller in 1867. Friends included painter George Fuller, with whom he travelled in the southern United States. Among Billings' possessions was a copy of Walt Whitman's Two Rivulets, annotated by Whitman, and notably auctioned for a relatively high sum in 1909.

Portrait subjects included:

- Josiah Bartlett, a founding father
- Ira Billings, father of E. T. Billings
- James Freeman Clarke
- Alpheus Crosby
- Thomas Russell Crosby
- John Davis
- George Fuller
- Helen Eliza Benson Garrison, wife of W. L. Garrison
- William Lloyd Garrison
- Oliver Wendell Holmes Sr.
- Abraham Lincoln
- Maria Mitchell
- Andrew Preston Peabody
- Abigail Lord Rogers
- Stephen Salisbury
- Daniel Webster
- Calvin Willard

Portraits by E. T. Billings

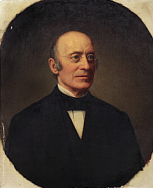
Portrait of W. L. Garrison, 19th century (New York Historical society)

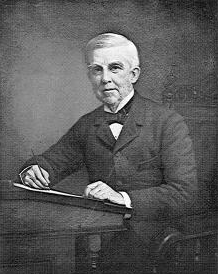
Portrait of O. W. Holmes Sr., 19th century

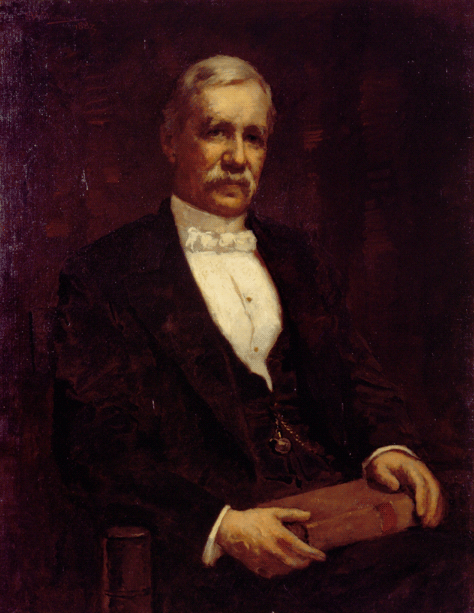
Portrait of Charles Gideon Putnam, MD, c. 1860s (Historic New England)

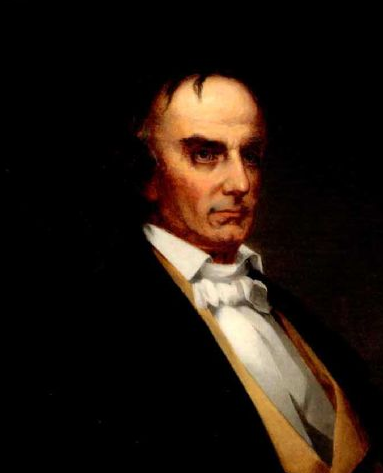
Portrait of Daniel Webster, 19th century

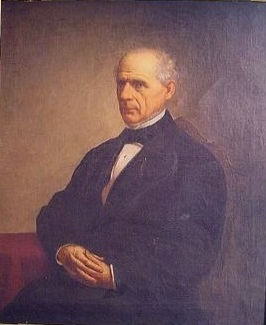
Portrait of Isaac Adams, 19th century
