= Elsie Motz Lowdon =

American painter (1883–1960)

- Born: Elsie Motz; December 10, 1883; Waco, Texas, US
- Died: May 19, 1960 (aged 76); Fort Worth, Texas, U.S.
- Resting place: Abilene Municipal Cemetery, Abilene, Texas, U.S.
- Other name: Elsie M. Lowdon
- Education: Baylor University
- Occupation: Painter

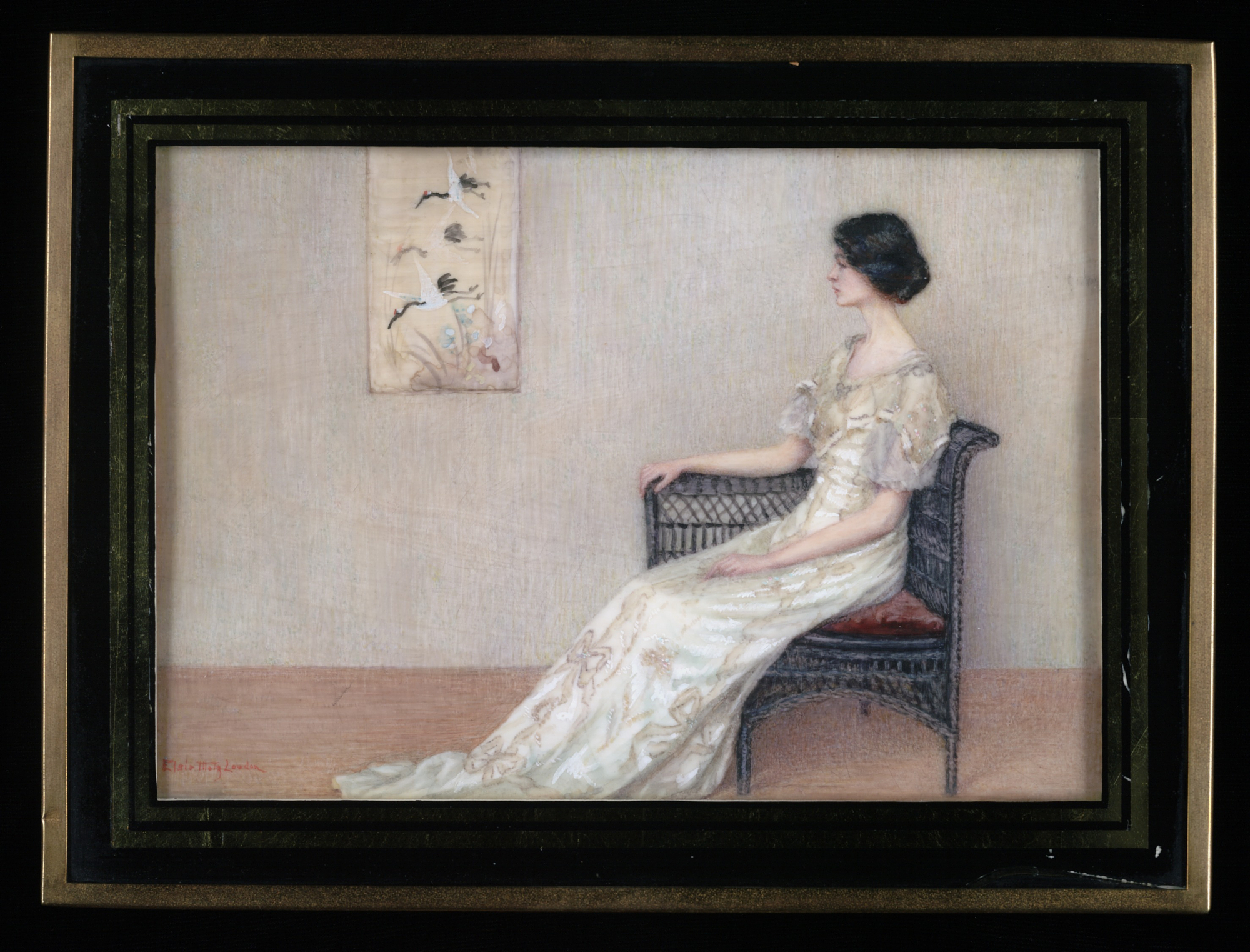
Elsie Motz Lowdon, Perdita, 1915, watercolor on ivory, Smithsonian American Art Museum, Gift of Alice L. McGowan, 1984.12.1

Elsie Motz Lowdon (1883–1960) was an American painter of portrait miniatures from Texas. She lived most of her life in Waco and Abilene, Texas.

== Life ==
Elsie Motz Lowdon was born as Elsie Motz on December 10, 1883, in Waco, Texas, and spent her early youth there. In the 1880s she moved with her family to Abilene, Texas. She studied with Eleanor T. Wragg at Baylor University in Waco, before moving to New York City, where she undertook further lessons with Lucia Fairchild Fuller and Elsie Dodge Pattee.

Her works were exhibited in New York City, in Atlanta, and in Washington, D.C. as well as in her native state, where she was included in the Texas Centennial Exposition of 1936; she also showed her work at a variety of other venues, presenting a portrait at the Panama–Pacific International Exposition in 1915. Known particularly for portraiture, she depicted members of such prominent Houston families as the Blaffers and Hobbys, as well as noted novelist Ellen Glasgow. Lowdon also produced a variety of interior and genre scenes.

She died of a heart attack on May 19, 1960, in a nursing home in Fort Worth.

Lowdon was a member of the National Association of Women Painters and Sculptors, the Southern States Art League, and the Texas Fine Arts Association. Four of her miniatures are in the collection of the Smithsonian American Art Museum, and two are owned by the Metropolitan Museum of Art. Her work may also be found in The Grace Museum in Abilene.
