= Ina Clare =

British actress (1932–2010)

- Born: 1932/33; Windsor, Berkshire, England, UK
- Died: 30 October 2010 (aged 77); Barnet, London, England
- Occupation: Actress
- Years active: 1972–2010

Ina Clare (1932/33 – 30 October 2010) was a British television actress, best known for her role as the background character Ina Foot in the BBC soap opera EastEnders. Clare also had roles in French and Saunders, Blake's 7 and In Sickness and in Health.

She was born in Windsor, Berkshire, and got her first job as a dancer in a pantomime at the Theatre Royal in Windsor at the age of sixteen. She suffered a cerebral haemorrhage and collapsed on the set of EastEnders on 28 October 2010 and died two days later, at the age of 77. The 1 November 2010 episode of EastEnders was dedicated to her.
