= Lowdon Heller =

American politician

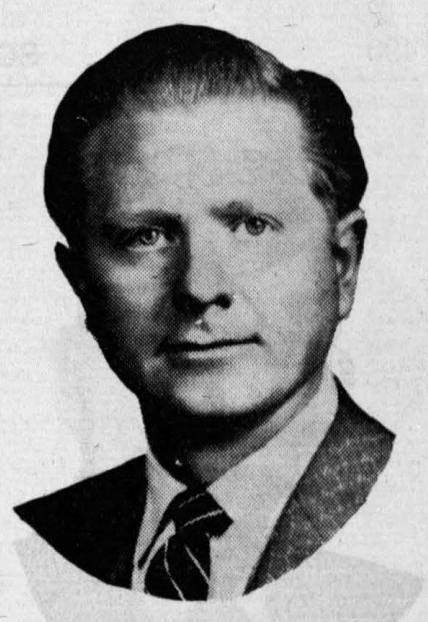

Member of the South Dakota House of Representatives
- In office 1957–1960

Personal details
- Born: February 24, 1924 Ideal, South Dakota
- Died: May 28, 2016 (aged 92) Gregory, South Dakota
- Party: Democratic
- Profession: businessman, farmer, teacher

Lowdon B. Heller (February 24, 1924 – May 28, 2016) was an American politician in the state of South Dakota. He was a member of the South Dakota House of Representatives from 1957 to 1960. He was an alumnus of the University of South Dakota and South Dakota State University, and was later a businessman, teacher and farmer. He died aged 92 in 2016.
