= Cornish Art Colony =

Art colony in New Hampshire, US

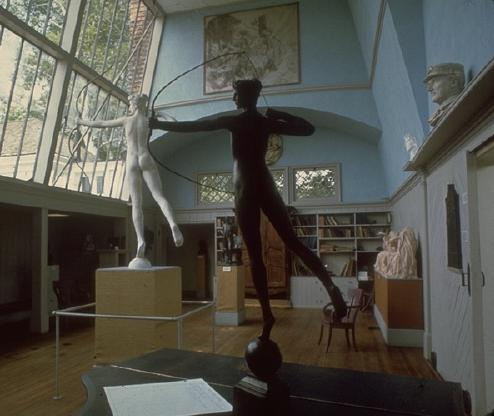
Studio at the Saint-Gaudens National Historic Site

The Cornish Art Colony (or Cornish Artists’ Colony, or Cornish Colony) was a popular art colony centered in Cornish, New Hampshire, from about 1895 through the years of World War I. Attracted by the natural beauty of the area, about 100 artists, sculptors, writers, designers, and politicians lived there either full-time or during the summer months. With views across the Connecticut River Valley to Mount Ascutney in Vermont, the bucolic scenery was considered to resemble that of an Italian landscape.

The central figure of the Cornish Colony was Augustus Saint-Gaudens. Beginning around 1885, Augustus attracted a summer colony of artists that grew into a single extended social network. Some were related, some were friends, some were promising students from the Art Students League of New York that Saint-Gaudens had co-founded, and some were Saint-Gaudens' assistants who developed significant careers of their own.

After his death in 1907 it slowly dissipated. His house and gardens are now preserved as Saint-Gaudens National Historic Site.

Though the colony's name referred to its social center in the village of Cornish, geographically it was spread out over the villages of Windsor, Vermont, and Plainfield, New Hampshire, as well. Windsor was the mailing address for the entire area and the arrival point of most of the colonists, who usually came from New York City by train.

== People associated with the Cornish Colony ==
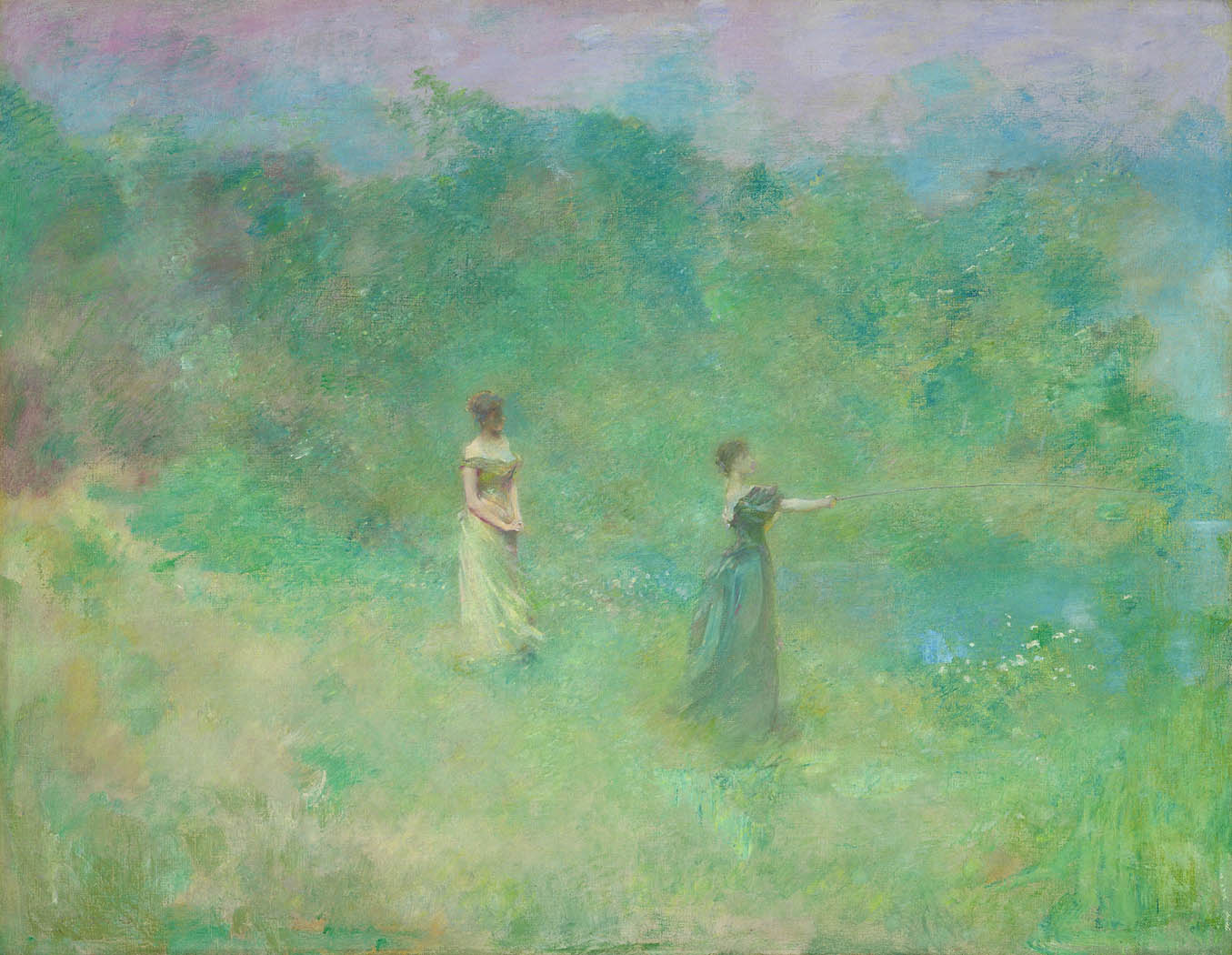
Thomas Dewing's Summer, 1890

The following people are known to have been part of the colony:

- Adeline Pond Adams, poet and art historian
- Herbert Adams, sculptor
- Ethel Barrymore, actress
- George de Forest Brush, painter
- Witter Bynner, poet
- Winston Churchill, American novelist
- Kenyon Cox, painter and muralist
- Herbert Croly, author and architect
- Thomas Dewing, painter
- Marie Dressler, actress
- Isadora Duncan, dancer
- Arthur Farwell, composer
- Barry Faulkner, muralist and mosaicist
- Daniel Chester French, sculptor
- Henry Brown Fuller, painter
- Lucia Fairchild Fuller, painter
- Learned Hand, judge
- Percy MacKaye, dramatist
- Paul Manship, sculptor
- Willard Metcalf, painter
- Rose Standish Nichols, garden designer, writer, and activist
- Maxfield Parrish, painter and muralist
- Stephen Parrish, painter and etcher
- Maxwell Perkins, editor
- Charles A. Platt, architect and garden designer
- Frederic Remington, painter, sculptor and author
- Augustus Saint-Gaudens, sculptor
- Louis St. Gaudens, sculptor and Augustus Saint-Gaudens' brother
- Everett Shinn, painter and illustrator
- Florence Scovel Shinn, illustrator and writer
- Ellen Biddle Shipman, landscape architect
- Bessie Potter Vonnoh, sculptor
- Robert Vonnoh, painter
- Woodrow Wilson, American president
- William Zorach, sculptor

== See also ==
- New Hampshire Historical Marker No. 134: The Cornish Colony
