= Meriden, New Hampshire =

Unincorporated community in New Hampshire, United States

- Unincorporated community
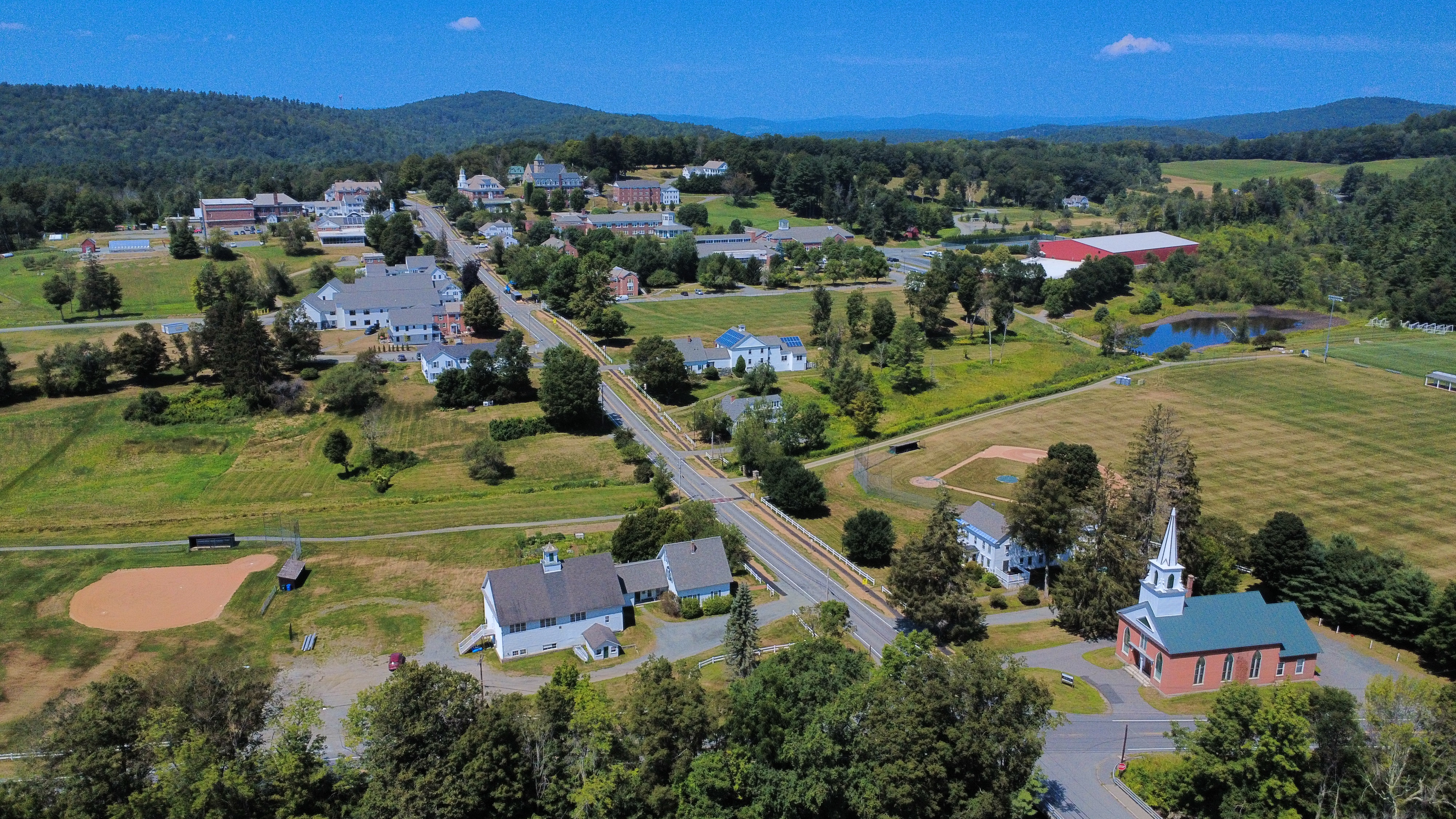
- Meriden, NH, from the southeast

- Location within New Hampshire Location within the United States
- Coordinates: 43°32′38″N 72°15′09″W
- Country: United States
- State: New Hampshire
- County: Sullivan
- Town: Plainfield
- Elevation: 928 ft (283 m)
- Time zone: UTC-5 (Eastern (EST))
  - Summer (DST): UTC-4 (EDT)
- ZIP code: 03770
- Area code: 603
- GNIS feature ID: 868389

Meriden is an unincorporated community in the eastern part of the town of Plainfield in Sullivan County, New Hampshire, United States. It is the location of Kimball Union Academy, a private boarding school. New Hampshire Route 120 passes through the village, leading north to Lebanon and south to Claremont.

Meriden has a separate ZIP code (03770) from the rest of Plainfield.
