= Plainfield, New Hampshire =

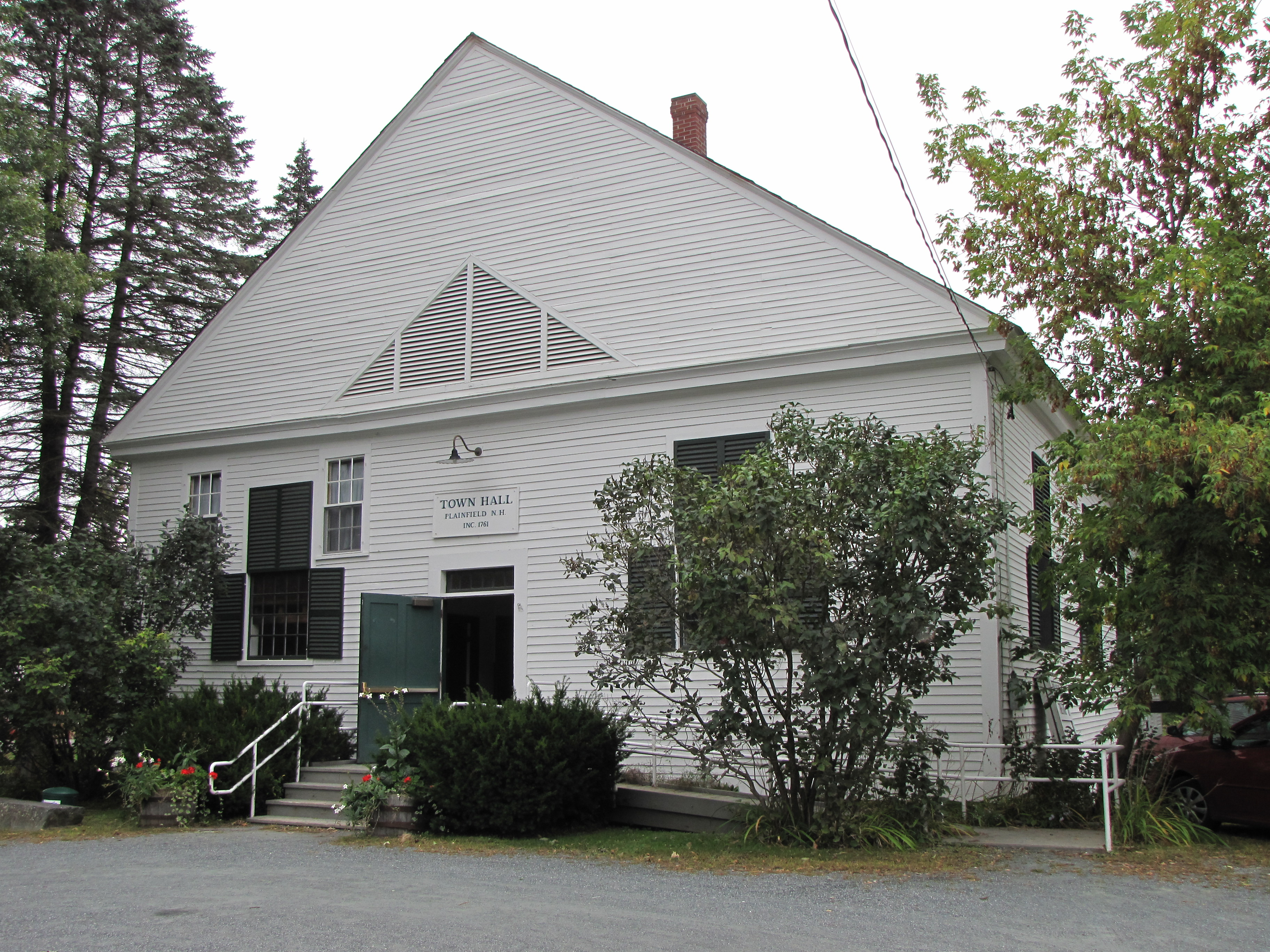
- Plainfield Town Hall

- Seal

- Location in Sullivan County and the state of New Hampshire.
- Coordinates: 43°33′04″N 72°16′57″W
- Country: United States
- State: New Hampshire
- County: Sullivan
- Incorporated: 1761
- Villages: Plainfield; East Plainfield; Meriden

Area
  - Total: 53.0 sq mi (137.2 km^{2})
  - Land: 52.2 sq mi (135.3 km^{2})
  - Water: 0.73 sq mi (1.9 km^{2}) 1.40%
- Elevation: 1,142 ft (348 m)

Population (2020)
  - Total: 2,459
  - Density: 47/sq mi (18.2/km^{2})
- Time zone: UTC-5 (Eastern)
  - Summer (DST): UTC-4 (Eastern)
- ZIP Codes: 03781 (Plainfield); 03770 (Meriden)
- Area code: 603
- FIPS code: 33-62340
- GNIS feature ID: 873700
- Website: www.plainfieldnh.org

Plainfield is a town in Sullivan County, New Hampshire, United States. At the time of the 2020 census, the town had a population of 2,459. The town is home to the Helen Woodruff Smith Bird Sanctuary and Annie Duncan State Forest.

The village of Plainfield, where 178 people resided at the 2020 census, is defined as the Plainfield census-designated place (CDP) and is located in the western part of the town along New Hampshire Route 12A. Plainfield also includes the village of Meriden, home to Kimball Union Academy, a private preparatory school.

== History ==
The town was first settled by a group from Plainfield, Connecticut. It was one of the towns incorporated by colonial governor Benning Wentworth in 1761, at the beginning of the reign of King George III. A part of Plainfield known as "Meriden Parish", named for the farm of Massachusetts Governor Jonathan Belcher, became the site of Kimball Union Academy, built in 1813.

Plainfield lies on the northern edge of the enclave known as the Cornish Art Colony, which existed between 1885 and 1930. Maxfield Parrish painted the stage backdrop in the Plainfield Town Hall. Parrish purchased land close to his parents' estate in 1898, at the age of 28, and relocated after leaving Philadelphia. He designed and built his home, The Oaks, over several years, eventually also designing and building an elaborate studio some distance behind the house. Parrish lived in Plainfield for 67 years, with the exception of a several-month period in Arizona, and a nine-month period when he resided and worked in New York City. In 1910, Ernest Harold Baynes founded the Meriden Bird Club, the first institution of its type in the nation.

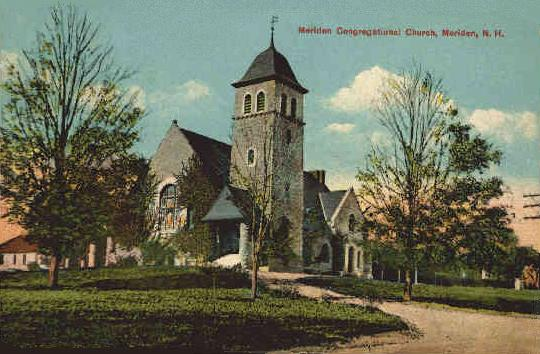
Meriden Congregational Church in 1914

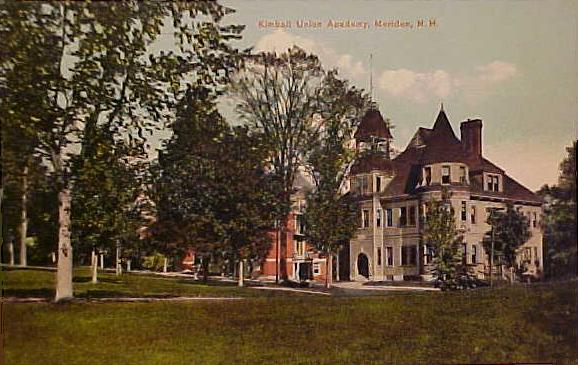
View of Kimball Union Academy c. 1910

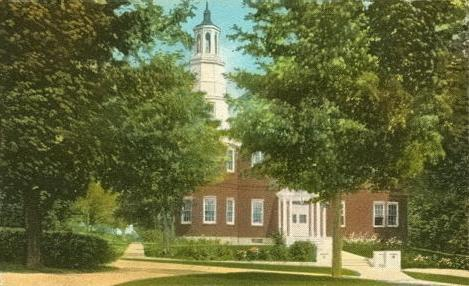
Baxter Hall c. 1922

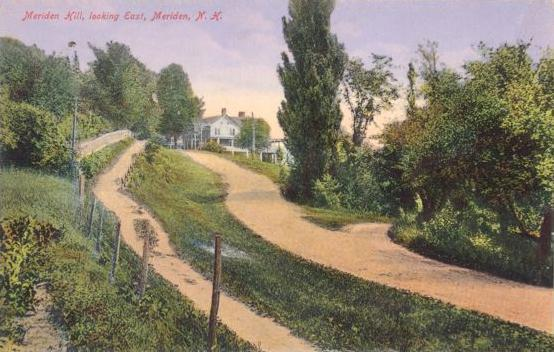
Meriden Hill c. 1908

== Geography ==
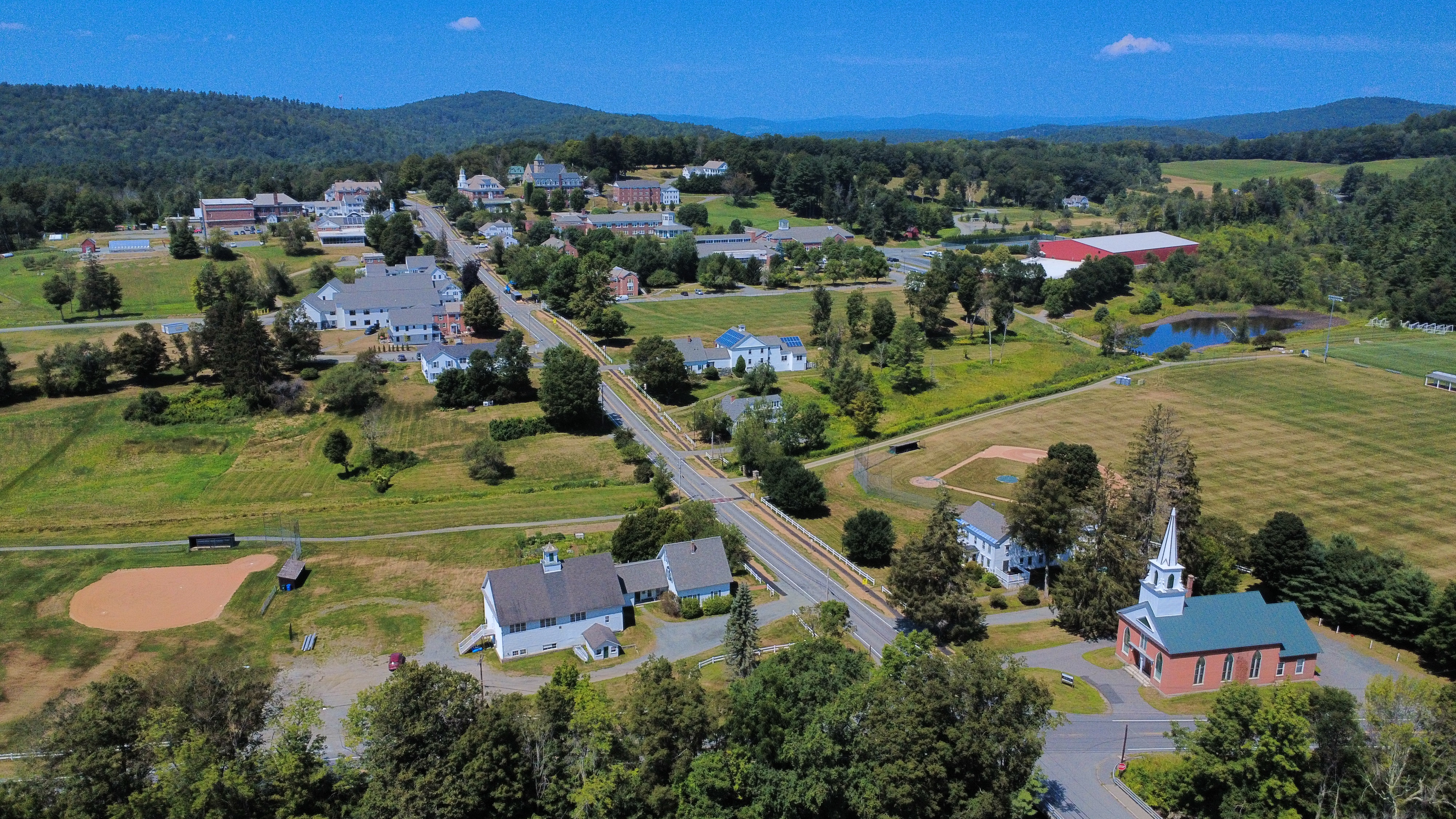
Meriden, NH, from the southeast

According to the United States Census Bureau, the town has a total area of 53.0 square miles (137.2 km^{2}), of which 52.2 square miles (135.3 km^{2}) are land and 0.73 square miles (1.9 km^{2}) are water, comprising 1.40% of the town. Bounded on the west by the Connecticut River, Plainfield is drained by Blood's Brook and Blow-me-down Brook. Great Brook, a tributary of the Mascoma River, drains the northeast corner of the town. Croydon Mountain is a high ridge that occupies the eastern edge of the town. Grantham Mountain, a peak along the ridge, is the highest point in Plainfield at 2,660 feet (810 m) above sea level.

The town is crossed by the north–south state routes 12A and 120. Route 12A, serving the western part of the town, passes through the village of Plainfield and leads north to West Lebanon and south to the west part of Claremont. Route 120, passing through Meriden in the eastern part of the town, leads north to downtown Lebanon and south to downtown Claremont.

=== Adjacent municipalities ===
- Lebanon (north)
- Enfield (northeast)
- Grantham (east)
- Croydon (southeast)
- Cornish (south)
- Windsor, Vermont (southwest at one point)
- Hartland, Vermont (west)

== Demographics ==
Historical population
Census	Pop.	Note	%±
1790	1,024		—
1800	1,435		40.1%
1810	1,463		2.0%
1820	1,460		−0.2%
1830	1,581		8.3%
1840	1,552		−1.8%
1850	1,392		−10.3%
1860	1,620		16.4%
1870	1,589		−1.9%
1880	1,372		−13.7%
1890	1,173		−14.5%
1900	1,114		−5.0%
1910	987		−11.4%
1920	853		−13.6%
1930	858		0.6%
1940	970		13.1%
1950	1,011		4.2%
1960	1,071		5.9%
1970	1,323		23.5%
1980	1,749		32.2%
1990	2,056		17.6%
2000	2,241		9.0%
2010	2,364		5.5%
2020	2,459		4.0%
U.S. Decennial Census

As of the census of 2010, there were 2,364 people, 923 households, and 684 families residing in the town. There were 984 housing units, of which 61, or 6.2%, were vacant. The racial makeup of the town was 98.0% white, 0.5% African American, 0.1% Native American, 0.5% Asian, 0.0% Native Hawaiian or Pacific Islander, 0.04% some other race, and 0.9% from two or more races. 1.1% of the population were Hispanic or Latino of any race.

Of the 923 households, 32.3% had children under the age of 18 living with them, 63.5% were headed by married couples living together, 7.0% had a female householder with no husband present, and 25.9% were non-families. 19.5% of all households were made up of individuals, and 6.4% were someone living alone who was 65 years of age or older. The average household size was 2.51, and the average family size was 2.88.

In the town, 22.8% of the population were under the age of 18, 4.4% were from 18 to 24, 22.4% from 25 to 44, 37.1% from 45 to 64, and 13.3% were 65 years of age or older. The median age was 45.2 years. For every 100 females, there were 100.0 males. For every 100 females age 18 and over, there were 97.5 males.

For the period 2011–2015, the estimated median annual income for a household was $82,250, and the median income for a family was $90,729. Male full-time workers had a median income of $56,385 versus $52,813 for females. The per capita income for the town was $38,810. 1.0% of the population and 0.3% of families were below the poverty line. 0.0% of the population under the age of 18 and 2.5% of those 65 or older were living in poverty.

== Notable people ==
- Ethel Barrymore (1879–1959), actress (summer resident)
- Edward and Elaine Brown, anti-federal-income-tax activists
- Ben Cherington (born 1974), vice-general manager of the Toronto Blue Jays
- Kathryn Woodman Leighton (1875–1952), artist
- Dennis Meadows (born 1942), former director of UNH Institute for Policy and Social Science Research
- Donella Meadows (1941–2001), farmer, MacArthur Fellow, author of The Limits to Growth
- Willard Metcalf (1858–1925), impressionist painter, seasonally between 1910 and 1920
- Maxfield Parrish (1870–1966), artist, illustrator
- Will Sheff (born 1976), musician
- Ellen Biddle Shipman (1869–1950), landscape architect
- Hollis Smith (1800–1863), businessman, Canadian politician
- Peter C. Whybrow, author, psychiatrist, director of the Semel Institute at UCLA
