= Nathan Allen (disambiguation) =

Nathan Allen (1813–1889) was a physician, social reformer, and public health advocate.

Nathan Allen may also refer to:

- Nathan Allen (travel writer), American travel writer and photographer.
- Nathan Allen, American chemist and forum moderator on the /r/science Reddit forum
- The Nathan Allen House, a historic house in Pawlet, Vermont
