= Voat =

American social networking service

Voat Inc.
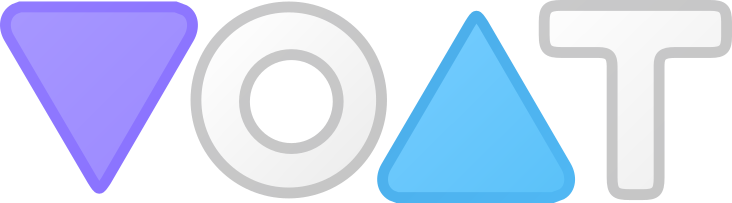
- Company type: Private
- Website type: Social news
- Available in: English
- Dissolved: December 25, 2020; 5 years ago
- Country of origin: Switzerland
- Website: voat.co (archived 2 January 2015)
- Commercial: Yes
- Registration: Required to post
- Launched: April 2014; 12 years ago (as WhoaVerse)
- Current status: Defunct
- Written in: C#

Voat Inc. (/ˈvoʊt/; styled VOΛT) was an American alt-tech news aggregator and social networking service where registered community members could submit content such as text posts and direct links. Registered users could then vote on these submissions. Content entries were organized by areas of interest called "subverses". The website was widely described as a Reddit clone and a hub for the alt-right. Voat CEO Justin Chastain made an announcement on December 22, 2020 that Voat would shut down. The site was shut down on December 25, 2020.

== Overview ==
Voat, founded as WhoaVerse, was a site which hosted aggregated content and discussion forums. According to Wired, Voat was "aesthetically and functionally similar to Reddit." Like Reddit, Voat was a collection of entries submitted by its registered users to themed categories (called "subverses" on Voat) similar to a bulletin board system. Unlike Reddit, Voat emphasized looser content restrictions and an ad-revenue sharing program. Voat was written in the C# programming language, while Reddit is written in Python.

Voat was described by media outlets including Quartz, The New York Times, New York, and the US and UK editions of Wired, as a hub for the alt-right. The site was also widely described as a clone of Reddit, or sometimes dubbed "the alt-right Reddit". In a January 2017 New Yorker article, Voat was described as a descendant of 2chan, 4chan, and 8chan, where users compete for shock value. The Verge described the site as "Imzy's dark twin", in that both were indirect products of the Gamergate culture war. The site has also been described by The Verge as a model for other "censorship-free" alt-tech services, including Gab, Parler, and Hatreon.

The name "Voat" is a play on the words 'goat' and 'vote'. The site's mascot is a goat. The website used the top-level domain .co, and was registered in November 2014.

== Company and funding ==
Founded in April 2014 as WhoaVerse, the website was a hobby project of Atif Colo (known on Voat as @Atko), then a college student. He was later joined by Justin Chastain (known as @PuttItOut on Voat). The website has been labelled as an alternative to Reddit with a focus on freedom of expression. In December 2014, WhoaVerse changed its name to Voat for ease of use.

Although Voat was based in Switzerland, Voat became incorporated in the United States in August 2015. Colo explained in a post announcing the incorporation that this was because "Switzerland seemed like a great option in the beginning, but when it comes to freedom of speech, the main idea behind Voat, U.S. law by far beats every other candidate country we’ve researched." Following a large influx of users from Reddit in July 2015, Voat's operators were approached by investors interested in funding the project, though they said they "hadn't had the time to talk" about the offers.

In January 2017, Colo resigned as CEO of Voat, citing a lack of time available to devote to the site. Colo was replaced as CEO by Chastain.

=== Shutdown ===
In May 2017, Chastain ran a fundraising campaign, announcing that Voat might have to shut down due to lack of money. However, after forming a partnership with an investor, Voat stayed online.

On December 22, 2020, Voat again announced that it would be shut down due to a lack of funding. Co-founder and CEO Chastain said that he had been funding the site himself after a key investor defaulted on their contract in March, but had run out of money by December. On December 25, 2020, Voat shut down.

== History ==
Over Voat's six years of operation, accusations of censorship against Reddit and its moderation decisions, including the banning of various subreddits, caused several influxes of Reddit users to Voat. In early June 2015, after Reddit banned five subreddits for harassment—the largest of which, r/fatpeoplehate, had around 150,000 subscribers—many users of Reddit began to create accounts on Voat. The influx of new participants temporarily overloaded the site, causing downtime. In early July 2015, following the dismissal of a popular administrator on Reddit, another influx of Reddit members registered with Voat, leading to traffic levels which again caused Voat to experience downtime. In November 2016, more users relocated to Voat after Reddit banned the Pizzagate conspiracy theory subreddit, r/pizzagate, due to doxing and harassment concerns. In November 2017, some of Reddit's incelosphere frequenters moved to Voat after an incel community, r/incels, was banned on Reddit. On September 12, 2018, Reddit banned several subreddits dedicated to discussing the QAnon conspiracy theory, stating that they had violated its rules prohibiting "inciting violence, harassment, and the dissemination of personal information." This caused many of the QAnon posters to migrate to Voat.

In April 2019, Voat's CEO announced in a post that he had been contacted by a "US agency" about threats that were being posted on the website. In the post, he wrote that Voat would work with law enforcement and take down any "gray area" posts if requested. According to Vice, "Voat users took offense to the perceived curtailing of their ability to post racial slurs and endorse violence. The first comment on Chastain's post opened with an anti-Semitic slur and call to exterminate Jews."

=== Deplatforming and cyberattacks ===
Voat's web hosting service, Host Europe (a precursor to Webfusion), refused service to Voat in June 2015, alleging that the service "was publicizing incitement of the people, as well as abusive, insulting and youth-endangering content" and "illegal right-wing extremist content." Host Europe is based in Germany, and is subject to stronger hate speech laws than those of the United States. Voat's founder attributed the shutdown to political correctness. PayPal froze payment processing services to Voat the same month due to "sexually oriented materials or services." Voat shut down four of its own subverses in response, two of which hosted sexualized images of minors ("jailbait"). The website continued to accept cryptocurrency donations, and was able to continue functioning as it had moved to a different hosting provider. The website continued to experience downtime due to an ongoing distributed denial of service (DDoS) attack, rendering the 700,000 unique visitors unable to access the site.

Also in July, Voat, alongside WikiLeaks, was subject to a Bitcoin "dust" attack and more DDoS attacks. The Bitcoin attack slowed payment processing to the websites. The DDoS attack, launched July 12, was unsuccessful due to Cloudflare DDoS protection services, although it had the side effect of rendering third-party Voat apps incapable of functioning.

== See also ==
- Controversial Reddit communities
- Gab
- 8chan
- DLive
- Minds
- Parler
