= Counter-Strike surfing =

Counter-Strike game mode

Overhead view of "Egypt 2" (surf_egypt2), a surf map created by Joyce, showing the obstacle course design of the level without emphasis on combat.

Counter-Strike surfing is a modded game mode based on the Counter-Strike series of first-person shooter video games. Consisting of custom-created obstacle course levels known as surf maps, players make use of a physics engine glitch to float along inclined planes while propelling themselves forward at high speeds in a manner resembling surfing. Accidentally invented by Charles "Mariowned" Joyce in the original Counter-Strike, surf maps gained significant popularity and continued to appear as fan-made levels in every game since. The game mode has been praised by both fans and critics for its casual and relaxing nature compared to typical Counter-Strike gameplay.

== History ==
Sliding game modes date back to Quake II, but did not gain significant popularity. The first Counter-Strike surf map was created in 2004 after Joyce, who had created a custom map called "Killbox" (ka_killbox), began to slide off the roof of a house and was able to jump to safety. Realizing this would be fun in and of itself, he began to create a new map solely dedicated to surfing, "The Gap" (surf_the-gap). The map solely had a ramp that led to a small platform with a button that would blow up the level. He later began creating more complex maps, such as "Egypt", "Christmas" and "Ninja". He struggled to gain popularity for the mode, leaving open dedicated servers and sometimes being flamed by players who were not able to perform the tricks. However, once he realized that tweaking a setting called "airaccelerate" from 10 to 100 would allow for easier movement, the mode took off with players. The mode expanded into a variety of multiplayer games, including Team Fortress 2.

Around 2008, Joyce gradually phased out of the community, but revealed his integral role in an AskReddit post later on, and was inundated with praise from fans, with some relaying anecdotes about how the maps saved them from depression or suicidal thoughts, causing him to become shocked and emotional. He reiterated that he did not claim to invent the idea of sliding in shooter games, but was the first to create dedicated maps and coin the term "surfing" in relation to them. He continued working on surf maps, creating "surf_eventide" in 2020.

== Gameplay ==
Surf dedicated servers are accessed from the game's built-in server browser, presenting obstacle-course-like levels that depend on players properly navigating a series of sloping ramps, jumping between them as they progress through the map. Smooth, sweeping motions with the mouse are necessary to avoid slipping off the ramps and losing momentum. Maps are separated into different difficulty tiers, with Tier 1 being the easiest.

== Reception ==
Luke Plunkett of Kotaku called surfing a "strange little quirk" that dramatically changed the game, making it faster and more chaotic. Steven T. Wright of Eurogamer called the mode a "fun palate-cleanser at the end of a long night of gaming", though he found it difficult to learn at first. Emma Matthews of Rock Paper Shotgun also described surfing as "fun", noting the satisfaction of achieving a perfect run. She stated that it also helped players improve their Counter-Strike skills, such as being able to bunny hop better. Alice O'Connor of the same publication said that she loved watching surfing, expressing the regret that she was bad at it herself and wanting to learn. She called newer surf maps graphically "amazing". Gökhan Çakır of Dot Esports called surfing "one of the more enjoyable casual experiences you’ll come across" when playing Counter-Strike, noting that it could also improve a player's jump timing.

Professional esports team Fnatic sponsored the creation of a surf map, "surf_summer", in 2017, with the appearance of a beach and boardwalk.

== Legacy ==
Nathan Grayson of Kotaku compared the wall-riding movement techniques of Overwatch hero Lúcio to surfing in Counter-Strike, noting that both required deceptive amounts of technique and constant momentum-based motion, and wondering if surf maps would be created for the game in a similar fashion.
