= R/anime =

Anime community on Reddit

r/anime
- Website type: Subreddit
- Available in: English
- Website: www.reddit.com/r/anime/
- Users: 10 million (as of May 2024)
- Launched: January 25, 2008; 18 years ago
- Current status: Active

r/anime is a subreddit dedicated to anime.

== Content ==
This website has more than ten rules, one of which stipulates that posts must be related to anime. Adult content is prohibited, and spoilers are generally subject to deletion. For anime currently airing, dedicated threads are created for each episode to facilitate discussion. Anime is defined as "an animated series, produced and aired in Japan, intended for a Japanese audience".

Since 2018, r/anime has held an annual anime awards ceremony to honor outstanding works. As of 2020, this subreddit has 1.3 million subscribers. The number of subscribers reached 10 million in May 2024.

== History ==
In 2016, when the music video for Shelter by Porter Robinson and Madeon was posted to r/anime, it was removed by moderators for failing to meet the definition of anime, despite having an approval rating of 98%. This decision sparked controversy and even escalated into death threats against the moderator.

In 2022, Takayuki Hirao, the director of Pompo: The Cinéphile, participated in an "Ask Me Anything" session on r/anime.

When Twins Hinahima which utilized AI in its production was broadcast in 2025, r/anime user reacted negatively to the production method. In the same year, negative reactions were also posted when Crunchyroll announced it was discontinuing its free, ad-supported streaming service.

== See also ==
- MyAnimeList
