= MyAnimeList =

English-language anime and manga database website

- Company type: Kabushiki gaisha
- Website type: Anime and manga social networking and cataloging
- Available in: English
- Headquarters: Tokyo, Japan
- Owner: Gaudiy
- Creator: Garrett Gyssler
- Key people: Yuya Ishikawa (CEO)
- Website: myanimelist.net
- Commercial: Yes
- Registration: Free
- Launched: November 5, 2004; 21 years ago
- Current status: Active

MyAnimeList, often abbreviated as MAL, is an anime and manga social networking and social cataloging application website run by volunteers. The site provides its users with a list-like system to organize and score anime and manga. It facilitates finding users who share similar tastes and provides a large database on anime and manga. As of January 2023, the site reported having over 23,000 anime and 62,000 manga entries in its database. In 2015, the site received 120 million visitors per month.

== History ==
The site was launched in November 2004 by Garrett Gyssler and maintained solely by him until 2008. Originally, the website was called AnimeList, but Gyssler decided to incorporate the possessive "My" at the beginning, following the fashion of the most important social network in those years: Myspace.

On August 4, 2008, CraveOnline, a men's entertainment and lifestyle site owned by AtomicOnline, purchased MyAnimeList for an undisclosed sum of money. In 2015, DeNA announced that it had purchased MyAnimeList from CraveOnline, and that they would partner with Anime Consortium Japan to stream anime on the service, via Daisuki.

MyAnimeList announced in April 2016 that they had embedded episodes from Crunchyroll and Hulu directly onto the site, with over 20,000 episodes being made available on the site.

On March 8, 2018, MyAnimeList opened an online manga store, in partnership with Kodansha Comics and Viz Media, allowing users to purchase manga digitally from the website. The service originally launched in Canada but later expanded to United States, the United Kingdom, and several other English-speaking countries.

MAL became inaccessible for several days in May and June 2018 when site staff took it offline for maintenance, citing security and privacy concerns. The site operators also disabled the API for third-party apps, rendering them unusable. The moves were done in an effort to conform to the European Union's GDPR program.

MyAnimeList was acquired by Media Do in January 2019; with their purchase, they announced their intention to focus on marketing and e-book sales to strengthen the site.

On September 25, 2019, Hidive and MyAnimeList announced a partnership which would incorporate MyAnimeList's content ratings into Hidive's streaming platform, while exclusively providing MyAnimeList users with a curated selection of embedded Hidive content for free.

On February 18, 2021, MyAnimeList announced it had conducted a third-party allotment of ¥1,200 million, with Kodansha, Shueisha, and Shogakukan, and parent company Media Do collectively investing ¥600 million. On May 31, 2021, it was revealed that Akatsuki, The Anime Times Company, DMM.com, and Kadokawa Corporation had invested ¥311 million during its initial third-party allotment. On July 26, 2021, it was revealed that Bushiroad, Dentsu, and other companies had invested ¥448 million, with the total third-party allotment raising to ¥1,360 million.

In October 2021, MyAnimeList collaborated with e-book publisher and parent company Media Do to release Fist of the North Star Manga Fragments: Dying Like a Man, a series of non-fungible token (NFT) products based on the Fist of the North Star manga.

On May 10, 2023, MyAnimeList went under an emergency maintenance after being hacked with the titles of all anime being replaced with a reference to Serial Experiments Lain. On May 13, the website resumed online activity after restoring its databases. Personal information and data of users was not breached during the hack, however any list updates, forum posts, edits, etc. made ~8.5 hours before the incident would have to be remade.

In April 2025, Gaudiy, a Tokyo-based company that specializes in Web3 and AI technology, acquired Media Do's ownership stake in MAL. On May 7, 2025, Gaudiy proceeded to buy out the remaining shareholders and in turn has become the sole owner of MAL.

== Features ==
MyAnimeList lists anime, aeni, donghua as well as manga, manhwa, manhua, doujinshi and light novels. Users create lists that they strive to complete. Users are able to submit reviews, write recommendations, blogs, produce interest stacks, post in the site's forum, create clubs to unite with people of similar interests, and subscribe to the RSS news feed of anime and manga related news. MAL also initiates challenges for users to complete their 'lists.'

=== Profile ===
MyAnimeList provides users the ability to customize their personal profiles and lists. List views can be freely customized, including cover image, background image, background image style, colors, and customized CSS. Users can customize their profiles with two options, "Modern" and "Classic". Classic provides the user with a text box to modify the profile's BBcode, allowing the user to freely add features to their profile. The "Modern" customization allows users to add an image, title, and introduction, along with the ability to show the user's published anime and manga. Furthermore, users have the ability to add certain rankings for manga and anime they enjoyed.

=== Scoring ===
MyAnimeList allows users to score the anime and manga on their list on a scale from 1 to 10. These scores are then aggregated to give each show in the database a rank from best to worst. A show's rank is calculated twice a day using the following formula:

$$R = \frac{vS + mC}{v + m}$$

Where $v$ stands for the total number of user votes, $S$ for the average user score, $m$ for the minimum number of votes required to get a calculated score (currently 50), and $C$ for the average score across the entire anime/manga database. Only scores where a user has completed at least 20% of the anime/manga are calculated.

In February 2020, MyAnimeList updated its scoring system to prevent vote brigading.

== Controversy and censorship ==
In January 2017, MyAnimeList rewrote an anti-Nazi article written by a contributor on the site without notice to the contributor. The contributor, who happened to be Jewish, criticized the website for softening the tone of the article and adding a semi-heroic nazi character.

MyAnimeList has been permanently blocked in Russia since October 2025, due to "extremist" LGBTQ+ content.

== See also ==
- Otaku
- Otaku USA
- Anime News Network
- The Visual Novel Database
- r/anime
