= MeaningCloud =

Software service

- Inception: 2015
- Manufacturer: MeaningCloud LLC
- Website: https://www.meaningcloud.com/

MeaningCloud is a Software as a Service product that enables users to embed text analytics and semantic processing in any application or system. It was previously branded as Textalytics.

MeaningCloud extends the concept of semantic API with a cloud-based framework that makes the integration of semantic processing into any system something close to a plug-and-play experience. MeaningCloud is available both in SaaS mode and on-premises.

== History ==
MeaningCloud is a brand by MeaningCloud LLC, a wholly owned subsidiary of MeaningCloud Europe S.L., previously known as Daedalus. Daedalus was founded in 1998 by Jose C Gonzalez and other colleagues as a spin-off from their Artificial Intelligence research lab at the Technical University of Madrid.

In June of 2022, Reddit acquired MeaningCloud for an undisclosed sum.

== Functionality ==
- Topic Extraction: identifies appearances of named entities and abstract concepts in the text.
- Text Classification: assigns a text to one or several categories in a predefined taxonomy.
- Sentiment Analysis: assigns a polarity (positive, negative, neutral) to a document or to the individual topics or attributes appearing in a document (aspect-based sentiment).
- Text Clustering: discovers the underlying themes in a document collection and groups these documents according to their similarities and their adherence to those themes.

== Integration and customization ==
Advanced APIs provide functionality for diverse applications. In addition, customization and integration capabilities offer a shorter learning curve and faster results.

- Customized resource management tools allow users to easily incorporate their own semantic resources (dictionaries, taxonomies, sentiment models) to adapt the operation of the system to their needs.
- SDKs and plug-ins increase the convenience and integrability of the APIs in the most common environments and platforms. MeaningCloud provides SDKs for Java, Python, PHP, and Visual Basic, and plug-ins for Microsoft Excel and GATE.

== Research Applications ==
Meaningcloud has been applied to compare French and English Tweets sentiment.

== See also ==
- Software as a service
- Natural language processing
- Computational linguistics
- Text mining
- Media monitoring
- Social media measurement
- Semantic publishing
- Semantic technology
