= Niniane Wang =

American engineer

Niniane Wang is an American software engineer and technology executive. In her early career at Google, Wang co-created Google Desktop and created Google Lively. She was previously vice president of engineering of Niantic after her company Evertoon was acquired by Niantic in 2017.

== Early life and education ==
Wang went to school in New Mexico and Nevada. At fifteen years old, she attended the California Institute of Technology, where she received a bachelor's degree. While studying for a master's degree in computer science at the University of Washington, she worked as an engineering team leader on Microsoft's Flight Simulator 2004.

== Career ==
=== Google ===
Wang worked at Google for five years starting in 2003. There she was an engineering manager of products such as Gmail and co-founded Google Desktop, winning a Google Founders' Award for the latter. In a 2008 post on Google's official blog, Wang announced Google Lively, a web-based virtual world officially part of Google Labs. Wang explained that she developed Lively as a "20% Project", referring to Google's practice of allocating a portion of its employees' paid work time towards personal projects. Google planned to make Lively into a platform for developers to create games, but ultimately discontinued the service after five months in December 2008.

=== Minted ===
For four years after she left Google, Wang was chief technology officer of Minted, an online marketplace that crowdsources designs for paper products such as stationery and wall art. During this time, in 2010, Wang and Yishan Wong founded the Sunfire Offices coworking space in Mountain View, California.

=== Evertoon and Niantic ===
Wang founded the company Evertoon in 2016. Evertoon's mobile app allowed users to produce short animated films. Evertoon raised $1.7 million in venture capital financing and released its app in November 2016.

In June 2017, Wang was one of six women who accused venture capitalist Justin Caldbeck of sexual harassment; she told Fortune magazine that it took "100 hours of work" before and after publishing the article that leveled the accusations against Caldbeck. Initially denying the allegations, Caldbeck resigned from his position at Binary Capital four days later.

In November 2017, American software developer Niantic acquired Evertoon and hired its team of five employees. The Evertoon app was shut down later that month. After the acquisition, Wang became Niantic's vice president of engineering, where she oversaw products including Ingress and Harry Potter: Wizards Unite.

=== Basis Set Ventures ===
Wang currently serves as the chief technology officer of Basis Set Ventures, a venture capital fund.
