= RedditGifts =

Gift exchange service website

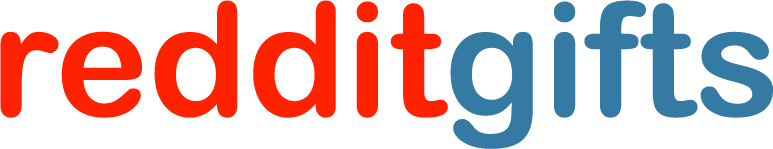
- Owner: Reddit
- Website: www.redditgifts.com (now links to reddit.com)
- Registration: Required to sign up for gift exchanges
- Launched: 2009; 17 years ago
- Current status: Discontinued

RedditGifts, stylized as redditgifts, was an online user-to-user gift exchange service for Reddit users. Free to participate in, RedditGifts was first created by Reddit user "kickme444" (the alias of Dan McComas), while working on freelance projects. The service had involved signing up, filling out a profile based on the user's preferences, and agreeing to send a gift to a randomly assigned user.

== Overview ==
The service matched a Reddit user with another Reddit user, and each user had to then send a gift to the other user according to that user's tastes and preferences listed on their profile. Participation was free, although extra perks could be purchased with the optional "RedditGifts Elves" membership, and goods were usually priced between $10 and $25 USD. The service also requested that users leave "thank-you notes" for their gift-giver on the website. The company took a 15 to 20 percent cut of every purchase.

After startup, it added a variety of different themed exchanges that ran throughout the year, such as a Halloween theme and a Nintendo theme. The service also runs the so-called "Arbitrary Day", which is "a celebration of nothing in particular". Before 2011, approximately $1.5 million had been spent on gifts.

Microsoft chairman and philanthropist Bill Gates participated in the service for five years under the username "thisisbillgates". This was confirmed by the Bill & Melinda Gates Foundation.

== History ==
RedditGifts was originally created by Reddit user Dan McComas and an anonymous user known as "5days". McComas first conceived the idea in 2009.

The site was launched in 2009 with 4,500 participants. RedditGifts reports that 212,894 people worldwide participated in the event during 2014.

The site was a three-time Guinness World Record holder for the World's Largest Gift Exchange.

2021 Secret Santa exchange was the last one to take place before the RedditGifts site was shut down in January 2022.

=== Reddit acquisition ===
In August 2011, Reddit bought the RedditGifts site. The two site-runners reportedly could not afford to continue maintaining the site while simultaneously working their day jobs. Both site-runners continued to run the website. Reddit operated the website as part of its ongoing plans to monetise their website. As of December 2013, approximately 14 percent of Reddit's revenue came from running the service, although McComas said that those sales alone could "put Reddit firmly in the black", and that the company may choose to reinvest funds in e-commerce customer service and infrastructure.

In December 2013, while expressing his desire for the Reddit business to become self-sustaining, then-Chief Executive Yishan Wong stated that the RedditGifts service "provides real value", and called it "promising" for the business. Wong increased the staff count dedicated to the project to eight after realising the service's potential.

On 9 June 2021, Reddit announced the shutdown of RedditGifts, effective at the conclusion of the 2021 Secret Santa exchange. New account registration was disabled when the announcement was issued.
