= Google Lively =

Defunct virtual-world website

Google Lively/Lively by Google/Lively by Google BETA
- Website type: Virtual world
- Owner: Google
- Creator: Google
- Launched: July 8, 2008
- Current status: Discontinued

Google Lively (also known as Lively by Google or Lively by Google BETA) was a web-based virtual environment created and developed by Google. It was discontinued and permanently shut down on December 31, 2008.

== History ==
Lively was only supported on Internet Explorer or Mozilla Firefox, using Windows XP or Windows Vista. It required a special download as well as Flash. The program was designed to be integrated with the Web and provided a new way to access information. This was enabled through the embedding of Lively "rooms" into any HTML webpage—which meant content could be provided in a two-dimensional format, and communication surrounding the topic of that content could be made in the three-dimensional room without the need to enter a separate program.

Encounter of two Lively avatars

Engineering manager Niniane Wang supervised this Google project, described in The New York Times by Brad Stone:

Up to 20 people could occupy a room and chat with one another. Text appeared as cartoon-style bubbles atop the avatars. Users could design their own virtual environments and hang YouTube videos and photos from Picasa, Google's photo service, on the walls as if they were pieces of art... Students at Arizona State University tested Lively for several months. Ms. Wang wrote in the blog post that she started Lively as a 20 percent project referring to Google’s philosophy that employees should spend one day a week working on projects outside their day-to-day responsibilities. Compared to Second Life, the virtual world run by Linden Lab of San Francisco, the world of Lively is considerably smaller. Also, unlike Second Life, in Lively, the users could not buy and sell products. Since there was no user-generated content on Lively, items such as hairstyles, clothing and furniture were limited to a catalog of pre-designed selections.

Google eventually introduced this product on July 8, 2008, with this comment by Wang:

If you enter a Lively room embedded on your favorite blog or website, you can immediately get a sense of the room creator's interests, just by looking at the furniture and environment they chose. You can also express your own personality by customizing your avatar's look, showing people who you are without having to say a word. Of course, you can chat with each other, and you can also interact through animated actions.

Gadgets in Lively rooms could also run on a user's desktop through Google Desktop.

== See also ==
- Metaverse
