= R/dataisbeautiful =

Subreddit focused on data visualization

r/dataisbeautiful
- Website type: Subreddit
- Available in: English
- Founder: u/zanycaswell
- Website: www.reddit.com/r/dataisbeautiful
- Commercial: Yes
- Users: 22 million (as of August 2025)
- Launched: February 14, 2012; 14 years ago

r/dataisbeautiful, also known as Data Is Beautiful, is a subreddit dedicated to aesthetically pleasing works of data visualization. It was created in 2012; as of January 2022, it has over 20 million members.

== Rules ==
The r/dataisbeautiful subreddit requires users submitting visualizations to clearly credit both the individual who created the visualization and the source of the data on which it is based. If someone submits a visualization they created themselves, the rules require them to put "[OC]" in the title of the submission, and to identify the source of data and software tool they used to create it. "OC" is a standard Reddit acronym for "Original Content".

== Media attention ==
A 2014 VentureBeat article noted that r/dataisbeautiful "...aims to collect the best of the Web in a daily rounded [sic] up of gorgeous data visualizations." The article also stated that the subreddit has been "unearthing the best ways to visualization thought-provoking and topical stories."

In November 2019, the decision of moderators at r/dataisbeautiful to temporarily ban animated bar chart graphs showing the relative position of entities on a list over time – so-called bar chart races – received attention from The Next Web.

In January 2020, Eleanor Peake noted that, because the subreddit had received so many submissions by Tinder users plotting their experiences on the app, one Reddit user set up a separate subreddit dedicated entirely to Tinder-related data visualizations.

Individual posts in the subreddit have also been reported on by the National Post and Vice.
