= R/BreadStapledToTrees =

Humorous subreddit where users staple bread to trees

r/BreadStapledToTrees
- Logo of the subreddit
- Website type: Subreddit
- Available in: English
- Founder: Charlie L. (Note: Charlie L. does not disclose his full surname)
- Website: www.reddit.com/r/BreadStapledToTrees/
- Commercial: Yes
- Users: 335K (as of August 2025)
- Launched: March 22, 2017; 9 years ago

r/BreadStapledToTrees is a subreddit in which users post photos of bread that has been stapled to trees. The posts create variations on the premise and unique combinations of bread and trees. As a virtual community, r/BreadStapledToTrees is popular for its absurd premise, but has a sense of community identity. Its absurdity has been compared to early internet culture.

The idea for r/BreadStapledToTrees was created by two high schoolers, Charlie L. and his friend, in March 2017. It became an internet meme with global participants, and the subreddit grew to hundreds of thousands of members. The subreddit grew in popularity during the COVID-19 pandemic. The subreddit has rules to ensure creativity, safety of trees, and adherence to the premise.

== History ==
r/BreadStapledToTrees was founded in March 2017 by Charlie L., nicknamed "the OG Bread Stapler". Charlie, who was 15 at the time, got the idea from a friend who came up with it after school; the two initially had the idea of a subreddit for "whole wheat bread stapled to trees", but changed it to be less specific. In a post from a since-deleted account, Charlie's explanation for the subreddit's creation was, "I honestly don't know." A post on the subreddit explains its premise with the definition of bread as a "staple food".

In 2019, the subreddit was covered in Esquire, which called it a "baffling new meme", and Yahoo! News, which called it a "bizarre trend". The subreddit surged in popularity during the COVID-19 pandemic as an outdoor activity people could do while staying at home. It gained over 315,000 members and three moderators by 2022.

Stapling bread to trees became a global trend. A member of a Facebook group for Redcliffe Peninsula residents posted a photograph of bread stapled to a tree in 2019; users responded by linking to the subreddit. The trend appeared in Sheffield, England, the same year, when a resident posted a photo and wrote, "There is a curious development in Brincliffe Gardens... Is this part of some weird new cult?"

== Content ==
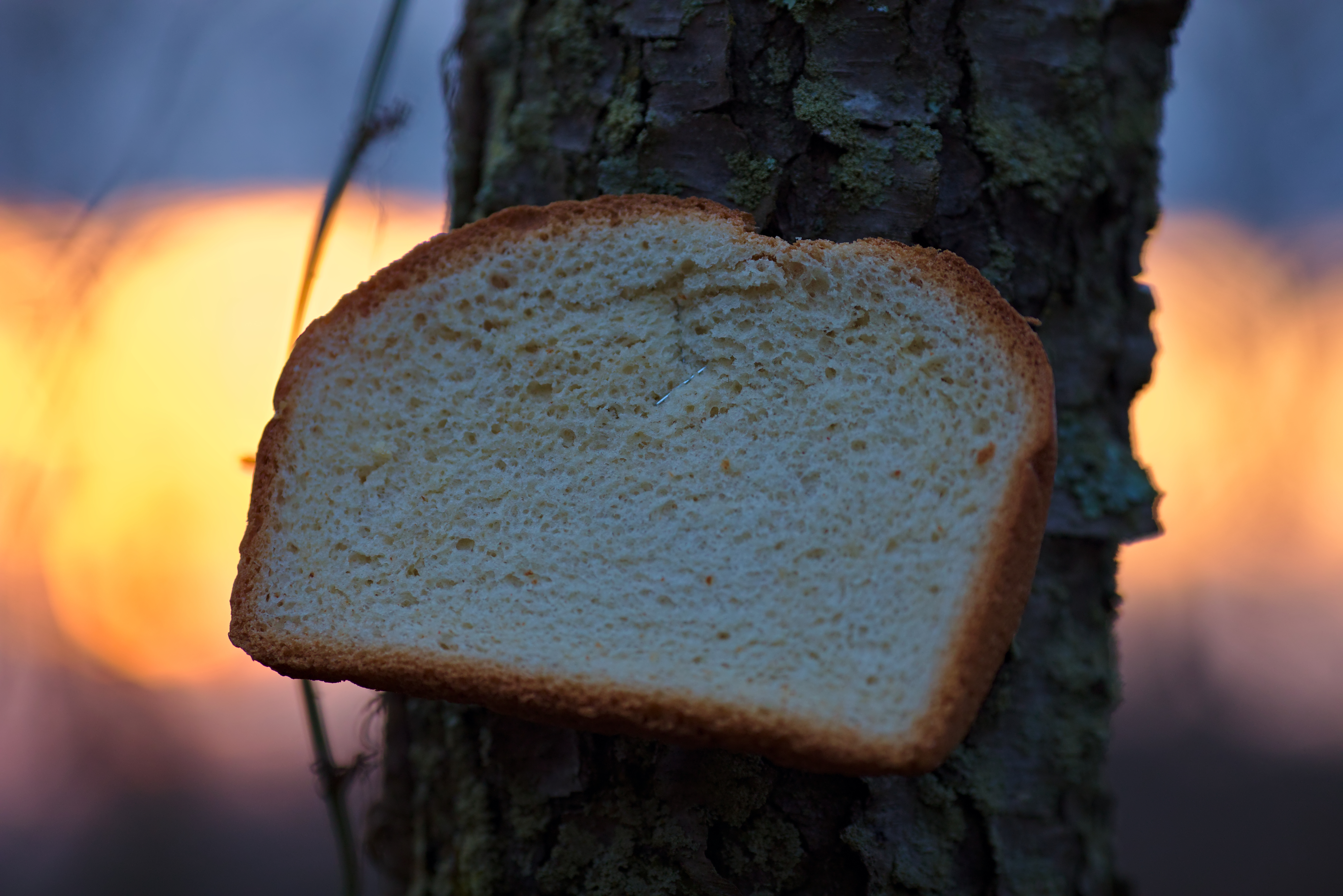
A photo of bread stapled to a tree, typical of the subreddit

The subreddit's first three rules say:

1. Don't post non-bread
2. Don't post non-stapled bread
3. Don't staple it to non-trees

The "acceptable bread list" specifies what is allowed to be stapled, including dough-based foods besides bread. Alternative subreddits exist for fastening methods other than staples. To ensure trees are not damaged, it is banned to use more than three slices of bread, or to use bonsai, cacti, or young trees, and it is recommended to remove staples after photographing them to prevent animals from eating them. The moderators remove posts that do not actually contain bread stapled to trees, but may make exceptions for creativity; moderator Bob Anderson told Bon Appétit, "We want people to actually be creative, actually go outside and staple bread to trees. We don't want someone to just be lazy with it."

Users come up with creative variations on the subreddit's simple concept. They post photos with titles describing their combinations of breads and trees, such as "Dempster's White on Canadian Oak". Some staple bread as a social activity or post bread they found stapled by others. Users have posted prom and homecoming proposals that consist of bread stapled to trees.

The subreddit's users provide friendly, constructive comments; a paper by social media analyst Kim Cousins says, "Although focused around an absurd topic, [it] is an example of a strong virtual community and displays many characteristics of a traditional offline community including weak ties and strong social identity." Bon Appétit and Esquire have compared the subreddit's weird appeal to the early internet.

== See also ==
Media related to /r/BreadStapledToTrees at Wikimedia Commons

- Apple Wassail — ritual that involves attaching bread to tree branches
- Bird feeding
