= R/malefashionadvice =

Subreddit for men seeking fashion advice

r/malefashionadvice
- Website type: Subreddit
- Founded: September 2, 2009; 17 years ago
- Owner: Reddit
- Website: reddit.com/r/malefashionadvice
- Users: 6.3 million (as of August 2025)

r/malefashionadvice is a subreddit for men seeking fashion advice. Founded in September 2009, the subreddit features men providing their outfits and asking for advice.

In June 2023, r/malefashionadvice protested changes to Reddit's application programming interface (API), and the subreddit's community moved to Discord and Substack. Reddit administrators seized control of the subreddit on July 20.

== History ==
r/malefashionadvice was founded by Jeremy Wagner-Kaiser in September 2009 after discussing men's fashion with other users on Reddit. Speaking to Esquire, Wagner-Kaiser said, "[r/malefashionadvice] was created explicitly to give advice to people who don't have any idea what they're doing. We want them to have clear, straightforward answers", referring to the elitism of forums such as NikeTalk, Superfuture, Styleforum, and Ask Andy About Clothes.

During the 2023 Reddit API controversy, r/malefashionadvice voted to become a subreddit to discuss male fashion of the 1700s, including imagery of Jack Sparrow, as did r/femalefashionadvice. The subreddit went private shortly afterwards as moderators urged members to move to Discord and Substack. Reddit administrators informed moderators that they would be removed if the subreddit remained private. On July 20, Reddit took over the subreddit under an account named "ModCodeofConduct". Reddit has called for additional moderators on the subreddit.

== Content ==
r/malefashionadvice is a community-focused advice subreddit; Wagner-Kaiser attributes the success of the subreddit to its anti-elitist mission, as well as novices and hobbyists. Users can run outfits by each other, ask advice, and provide resources. "What I'm Wearing", a regular thread on the subreddit, features users sharing their outfits and asking for advice. "What Are You Wearing Today?" is a biweekly thread in which users share their outfits in pride. Joseph Knowles, a Vancouver student, was voted twice in a row as the subreddit's best-dressed man for his entries in the thread.

The culture of r/malefashionadvice references Internet memes. The inexpensive, generic "Basic Bastard" attire, a frequent in-joke, has developed from a blue Oxford shirt, khaki chinos, and desert boots from Clarks, to a gray crew neck sweater, denim, and minimalist white sneakers. The moderators of the subreddit attempt to avoid toxic masculinity, pickup artists, and men complaining about high fashion, such as a Thom Browne runway.

== Reception and influence ==
Law professor and blogger Ann Althouse praised the subreddit in a 2019 blog post. The Wall Street Journal reporter Jacob Gallagher tested several methods to identify a jacket David Beckham wore on The Late Late Show with James Corden, finding asking r/malefashionadvice to be the fastest method; users correctly identified the jacket from RRL, Ralph Lauren's rugged brand.

r/malefashionadvice and r/malefashion have been used to organically promote products. In 2011, fashion brand Outlier appeared on the front page of Reddit through r/malefashionadvice, leading the brand to create its own subreddit. The outfit calculator Twelve70 experienced a surge in popularity after its creators posted the app on r/malefashionadvice, becoming one of the most popular posts on the subreddit.

== In academia ==
Sociologist J. Slade Lellock analyzed r/malefashionadvice in a 2018 study, finding that the subreddit reflected a shift in masculinity and an acceptance of fashion, though reserved that engagement in fashion is strategically supportive of men's ideals, affirming fashion scholar Ben Barry's assertion.
