= Jen Wong =

American business executive

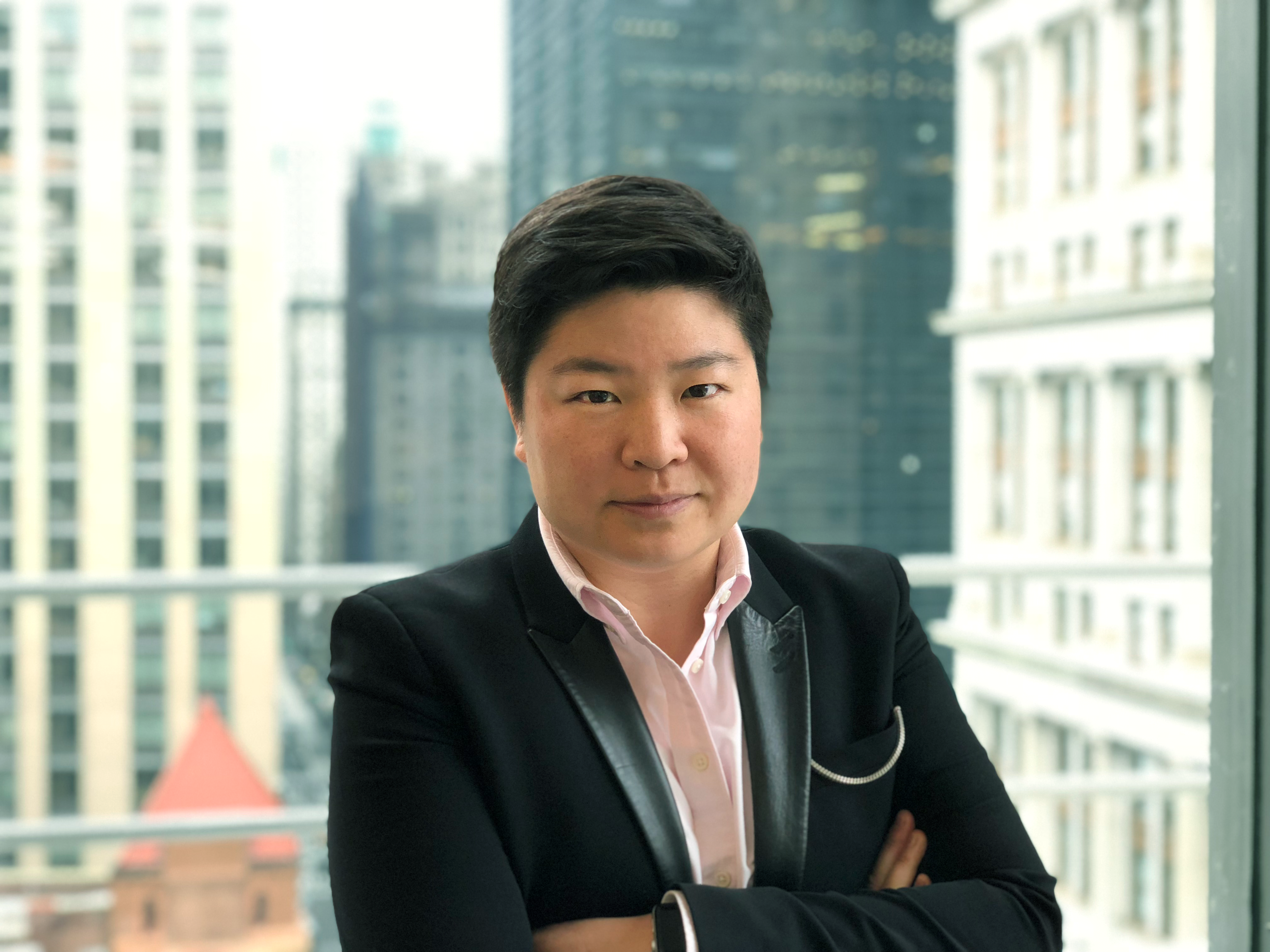
- Wong in 2025
- Born: c. 1975 (age c. 50–51)
- Education: Yale University (BA); Stanford University (MA); Harvard University (MBA)

Jen Wong (born c. 1975) is an American business executive and COO of Reddit, overseeing its business strategy. She also serves on the Board of Directors for Capital One. Wong was previously president of digital and chief operating officer at Time Inc. and worked at McKinsey.

She became the COO of Reddit in 2018. Under Wong's tenure, Reddit's ad revenue was expected to double in 2021 to $350 million. Wong has spoken publicly about Reddit's platform safety.

Wong was No. 4 on Fast Company's 2021 Queer 50 list and No. 1 on their 2022 list. She graduated from Yale University (BS), Stanford University (MS), and Harvard University (MBA).
