= R/HaveWeMet =

Reddit roleplay community

r/HaveWeMet
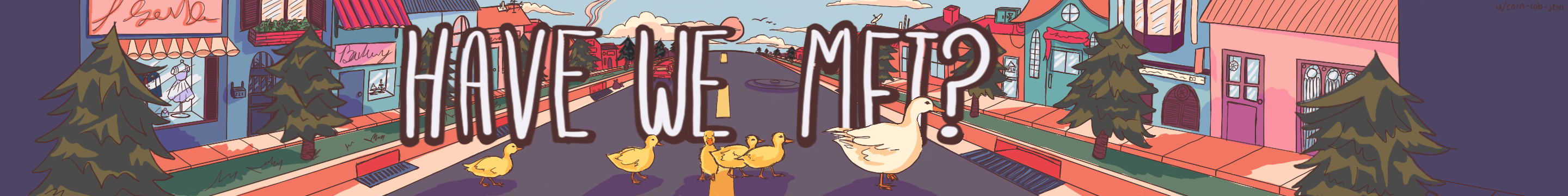
- Website type: Subreddit
- Available in: English
- Founder: Devuluh
- Website: reddit.com/r/HaveWeMet
- Users: ~145,000 members (as of August 2025)
- Launched: February 9, 2017; 9 years ago

r/HaveWeMet is a subreddit where members roleplay as residents of a fictional town known as Lower Duck Pond. Members also create fictional, in-depth personas for themselves. As mutual residents of Lower Duck Pond, users pretend to know each other in improvised interactions, continuously developing the lore of the town. The Verge compared HaveWeMet to a "long-running D&D campaign". HaveWeMet was created by the user Devuluh, or David, a college sophomore majoring in computer science, in early 2017.

== History and content ==
HaveWeMet was created by the user Devuluh, or David, a sophomore majoring in computer science, in early 2017. He was inspired to create the subreddit after starting a thread on the subreddit findareddit, discovering that there were no communities where people pretended to know each other. The first members joined from this thread. The next day, HaveWeMet was on trending on Reddit. Guidelines include that members must stay in-character and act like they have personally known every user they interact with for a long time. They cannot break the illusion of the basic premise.

Interactions are improvised and roleplayed. Storylines are often protracted and span multiple forum posts and comments. This develops the lore behind the town of Lower Duck Pond. Members invent fictional personas they roleplay as, and often use flairs ("nametags") next to their usernames to mark the name of their character.

A town council was formed to discuss concerns in the community. Members can role-play as animals: several animals such as "Ulysses the alpaca" have been elected mayor of Lower Duck Pond. Unlike most subreddits, members are allowed to operate multiple accounts to role-play as different characters. User WanderCold, one of the more prominent members, role-plays as a weatherman with a merchandise shop and regularly reports on fictionalized weather. Several fictional locations in the town, such as stores, bars, and amenities, have been established. There are also fictionalized local events, such as a murder and occult activities. Strange "quirks", such as having a group of elks for pets, are accepted unquestioningly within the roleplay.

HaveWeMet has inspired several spinoffs, such as the subreddit WillWeMeet, a futuristic variant, and the more seriously-oriented subreddit LakeWobegon. The subreddit HaveWeMeta is where users are able to comment on events in Lower Duck Pond out-of-character and from a real-world context. Two years after its inception, in September 2019, HaveWeMet had over 87,000 members.

== Reception ==
The Verge compared HaveWeMet to a "long-running D&D campaign". It has also been compared to the Facebook page of a small town. Neon listed HaveWeMet as one of the weirdest subreddits.
