= Nathan Allen (travel writer) =

American travel writer and photographer

- Occupation: Travel Writer Photographer

Nathan Allen is a travel writer and photographer from The United States. He is the creator of the lifestyle and travel website "I Dreamed Of This". In November 2013 he finished up a year living around and exploring the Philippines, then wrote an article about his observations. It was originally titled "What I REALLY The article on November 30, 2013, retitling it "A year in the PHL: Honest observations from a Westerner on his way home”.

In January 2016, Nathan ended up on the No. 2 spot of HuffPost UK's "World's Top Male Travel Bloggers".

== Persona Non Grata ==
CNN Philippines reports that on a subsequent visit to the Philippines in April 2015, Allen wrote a Facebook post about being "disappointed in Donsol", a town in the eastern region of Sorsogon. Allegedly, Allen had visited the Donsol Tourism Office, and explained who he was and why he was there. He requested the staff to have the local tourism officer contact him. He stated that he never received a response.

Citing that Allen's post had reached "thousands of people" who may no longer want to visit Donsol, the board of the Donsol Tourism Office filed a resolution declaring him persona non grata in Sorsogon on May 2.
