= R/AskReddit =

Subreddit providing a forum for users to ask questions

AskReddit
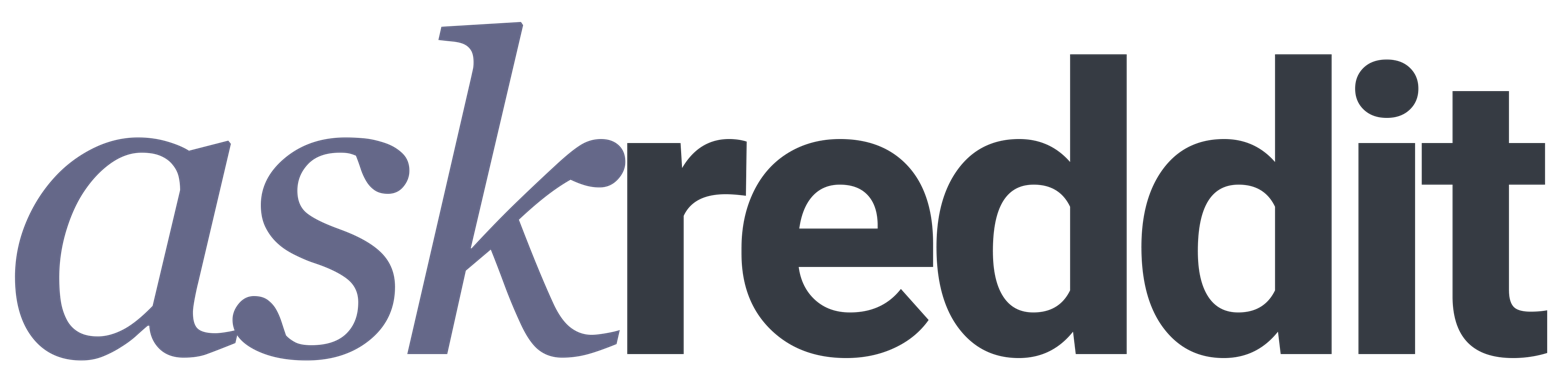
- Website type: Subreddit
- Available in: English
- Website: www.reddit.com/r/AskReddit/
- Commercial: Yes
- Users: 57 million (as of August 2025)
- Launched: January 25, 2008; 18 years ago

AskReddit, sometimes stylized as Ask Reddit or Ask Reddit..., is a subreddit on the website Reddit, where users can submit open-ended questions to which other users can then reply. The subreddit describes its focus as "to ask and answer questions that elicit thought-provoking discussions". As of July 2015, AskReddit was the most popular subreddit on all of Reddit, and as of December 2024, it has 50 million members. In November 2018, Kevin Wong of Complex wrote:

Reddit bills itself as the front page of the Internet. If one were to extend this metaphor, then AskReddit would be the headline splashed across the top of that front page, because there is nothing as consistently exciting, absorbing, and cringe-worthy as the posts on AskReddit.
