= Unidan =

American redditor and ecologist (born 1986)

Ben Eisenkop
- Born: August 9, 1986 (age 40)
- Other names: Unidan (username); UnidanX (username post-ban)
- Citizenship: United States
- Education: Binghamton University (BS)
- Known for: Answering questions about biology and ecology on Reddit, subsequent ban from the website for vote fraud
- Scientific career
- Fields: Biology, Ecology
- Workplaces: Binghamton University, New York, United States
- Patrons: Reddit

Ben Eisenkop, known online by his Reddit username Unidan (born August 9, 1986), is an American ecologist. He became popular on the social media website Reddit as the "excited biologist" who answered questions and explained concepts related to biology and ecology before being banned from the website for vote fraud – using multiple secret accounts to increase the popularity of his own posts and decrease the popularity of competitors' posts.

== Background ==
Eisenkop earned his bachelor's degrees in biology and environmental science from Binghamton University in Vestal, New York. He was a doctoral student there from 2011 until 2018, but left before completing his doctoral degree. He worked as a graduate instructor in the Department of Biological Sciences at Binghamton University, teaching courses in biology, ecology, and environmental science. He performed doctoral research on ecosystem ecology, studying how communally roosting crows in New York affect the environment.

== Career ==
Eisenkop wrote an article for Mental Floss. He has been a graduate instructor for Biology 117: Introduction to Organismal, and Population and Environmental Studies 101: Environment and Man/Women: An Ecological Perspective, and helps instruct an animal behavior course with professor Anne Clark and has been involved in studying communally roosting crows in New York, by tracking them across the state and monitoring their environmental impact. He was also a collaborator on the book Great Adaptations, which teaches concepts of evolution to kids. In April 2014, Eisenkop hosted a TEDx with Binghamton University, "Alternative Futures of Science Funding".

== Reddit ==
Eisenkop, using the pseudonym Unidan, had been answering biology-related questions on Reddit for several years, when an Ask Me Anything ("AMA", a Q&A style event hosted on Reddit) he did in 2013 made it to the front page of Reddit. Thereafter, his popularity rose and he became one of the most recognizable Reddit users. Eisenkop's popularity and visibility on Reddit garnered him many science education-related job offers, such as with Mental Floss.

=== Vote fraud and site ban ===
In July 2014, Eisenkop's Unidan account was banned from Reddit for using alternate (or "sock puppet") accounts. The accounts were used to upvote his own submissions and downvote submissions made by other users that were posted around the same time and were potentially attracting attention away from his own. He also used them during discussions in which he upvoted his own comments and downvoted comments from users whom he was debating. Reddit community manager Alex Angel (cupcake1713) described Unidan's actions as "pretty blatant vote manipulation, which is against our site rules", and The Daily Dot wrote that "Unidan's fall adds him to a list of power users who have abused their influence of Reddit's system for their own benefit".
