= Imzy =

- Headquarters: Salt Lake City, Utah
- Founder: Dan McComas
- Industry: Social networking service
- Parent: Saurus, Inc.
- Website: imzy.com
- Launched: 2016
- Current status: Defunct as of 2017

Imzy was a social media site led by ex-Reddit employee Dan McComas, which purported to create a "friendlier" alternative to Reddit. The site was started in 2016 by six former employees of Reddit and one of Twitter (Joshua Fraser). Some of the first publications to announce collaboration with Imzy include Lenny Letter and the podcasts Harmontown and Black Girls Talking. On 24 May 2017, Imzy announced that the site was shutting down as they had failed to "find [their] place in the market."

== History ==
Product Chief Dan McComas left Reddit in July 2015 over disagreements on how the site should be run. This happened during a revolt by users that involved the shutdown of the Ask Me Anything subreddits. In August 2015, McComas's wife Jessica Moreno stepped down as Head of Community at Reddit. This made her the fourth prominent female employee to leave the company in that month. Moreno accused a Recode article of insinuating a connection with the other three departures and stated that she was leaving for family reasons. Nevertheless, she later stated that threats of rape and death were part of her experience working for Reddit. Other founding members of Imzy cited the inconvenience of working in San Francisco as motivation to start a new business.

The following year, McComas, Moreno and the rest of their team founded Imzy in Salt Lake City. Upon launch, it raised $3 million from Charles River Ventures and O’Reilly AlphaTech Ventures. The name was chosen as a happy-sounding word that could be easily searched.

== Business model ==
Imzy integrated a system for users to tip one another and took a percentage of each transaction. On the company's decision to avoid running ads, McComas stated "you get into this game of selling certain kinds of ads, and then you need to add enough traffic to those communities. This flies directly in the face of keeping communities healthy."

McComas had also expressed a desire to enforce a positive atmosphere through the architecture of the website rather than direct intervention. As part of this effort, groups on Imzy only accepted posts from people who were already subscribed. Also, Imzy used community-wide as opposed to site-wide usernames to disincentivize the creation of new accounts. Moreno had stated that some Imzy accounts belonged to people who are known for breaking some of Reddit's rules. She has stated that they were acting in a thoughtful manner on Imzy and attributed this to a culture that rewarded a different type of discourse. In June 2016, Gina Bianchini revealed that she was pessimistic about Imzy becoming more than a niche platform.

In May 2017, Dan McComas announced that the site would shortly be ceasing operations due to having failed to find its place in the market.
