= Suicide of Sunil Tripathi =

2013 suicide of an American student

Sunil Tripathi
- Status: Body found April 23, 2013
- Died: March 16, 2013; Providence, Rhode Island, U.S.
- Cause of death: Suicide by drowning
- Education: Brown University
- Known for: Wrongly accused of being one of the perpetrators of an April 15, 2013 bombing of the Boston Marathon

Sunil Tripathi (died March 16, 2013) was an American student who went missing on March 16, 2013. His disappearance received widespread media attention after he was wrongfully accused by Reddit users to be a suspect in the Boston Marathon bombing. Tripathi had been missing for a month by the time of the attack, which took place on April 15. His body was found on April 23, after the actual bombing suspects had been officially identified and apprehended.

== Disappearance ==
Sunil Tripathi, a Brown University undergraduate student, had gone missing on March 16, 2013, having suspended his studies due to bouts of depression. He had left his phone and wallet behind in his student accommodation. Tripathi's family turned to social media to assist in their search for him, uploading a video to YouTube and setting up a Facebook page. His father was an immigrant from India.

== Misidentification ==
In the aftermath of the Boston Marathon bombing, Tripathi was one of several people misidentified as a suspect by users on social media. On April 16, 2013, one day after the bombings, Reddit users created a subreddit named r/findbostonbombers with the intention of consolidating the information surrounding the events of the bombings in an attempt to identify the culprits of the attack. By Wednesday, April 17, over 3,000 people had joined the subreddit in order to crowdsource the investigation of the evidence. At 5:00 p.m. on April 18, the Federal Bureau of Investigation published photos of the suspects believed to be involved in the bombings. Soon after, another Redditor named Tripathi as a plausible suspect after asserting a resemblance between the suspects in the FBI's pictures and Tripathi, who had gone missing a month before the bombings. Although this behavior violated the subreddit's rule that prohibited naming suspects without evidence, the moderators did not delete the post. To further the speculation behind Tripathi, a woman claiming to be his classmate tweeted that she too thought Tripathi resembled a suspect in the FBI's photographs.

Soon after the release of the photos, people began trying to contact the Tripathi family through phone calls on ABC News as well as angry messages on Tripathi's Facebook page dedicated to finding him. At 11 p.m. on the same day, the real bombing suspects (Dzhokhar and Tamerlan Tsarnaev) shot and killed a police officer of the Massachusetts Institute of Technology Police Department. The following day at 2:45 a.m., a Reddit user reposted a tweet by Twitter user "Greg Hughes": "BPD has identified the names: Suspect 1: Mike Mulugeta. Suspect 2: Sunil Tripathi." This caught the mainstream media's attention after BuzzFeed reporter Andrew Kaczynski shared a tweet that named Tripathi as the primary suspect from his personal Twitter account. According to the BBC, Tripathi had soon become the "standout suspect" on social media before the FBI identified the real suspects to be the Tsarnaev brothers.

Tripathi was found dead on April 23. Mulugeta was an unrelated person whose last name was spelled out in the Boston Police scanner that night, and whose first name was never confirmed to be "Mike." Tripathi's name was never mentioned in the scanner.

=== Reaction ===
The misidentification of Tripathi led to questions in the media about whether the so-called "crowd-sourced investigations" should be prevented in the future, citing the harm caused to people such as the relatives of Tripathi, as well as other wrongly-identified suspects who then feared for their safety. Some argued that they are unstoppable because of the nature of the Internet, with the only hope being that awareness of the possible effects of errors such as this would lead to future caution. Reddit issued a public apology for providing a forum wherein users openly speculated upon suspects.

Posting on Facebook, Tripathi's family described the tremendous amount of attention the misidentification had caused as painful, but they sought to use the negative publicity of the case to assist in their search by raising awareness.

== Discovery of death ==
A decomposed body was found floating in the stretch of the Seekonk River behind the Wyndham Garden Providence hotel on April 23, 2013. Using dental records, it was confirmed to be Sunil Tripathi. The cause of death was not immediately known, but authorities said they did not suspect foul play. The family later confirmed Tripathi's death was a result of suicide by drowning on March 16.

== In media ==
The CBS drama, The Good Wife based the episode "Whack-a-Mole" (first aired on November 24, 2013) on the misidentification of Tripathi. Although the name was changed, the creator of the show researched what happened to Tripathi and based the episode around the legal ramifications that social media sites potentially face as a result of false information being disseminated.

In "Boston", the season 3 premiere of the HBO series, The Newsroom (first aired on November 9, 2014), the editorial staff discuss the misidentification of Tripathi.

Help Us Find Sunil Tripathi, completed in early 2015, is a documentary feature film that examines what happened during the night of the misidentification and how the story spread from social media to traditional media. The film features voicemails left by journalists and family footage. The story is told through interviews with the Tripathi family, friends, journalists, and former Reddit general manager Erik Martin. The documentary was aired on Al Jazeera America on February 14, 2016.

== See also ==
- List of solved missing person cases (post-2000)
