= Yishan Wong =

American engineer and entrepreneur

- 黄易山
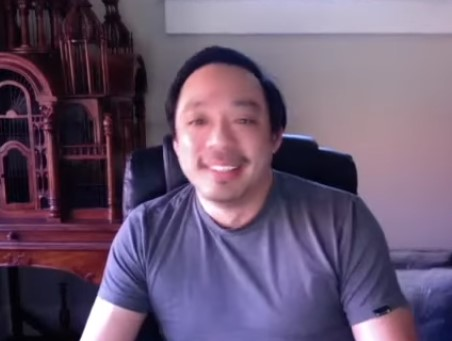
- Wong in 2019
- Born: Pittsburgh, Pennsylvania, United States
- Education: Carnegie Mellon University
- Occupation: Co-founder of Sunfire Offices
- Years active: 1997-present
- Known for: Former CEO of Reddit
- Spouse: Kimberly Algeri-Wong
- Website: algeri-wong.com

Yishan Wong
- Simplified Chinese: 黄易山
- Traditional Chinese: 黃易山
- Hanyu Pinyin: Huáng Yìshān
Transcriptions
Standard Mandarin
- Hanyu Pinyin: Huáng Yìshān

Yishan Wong (Chinese: 黄易山; pinyin: Huáng Yìshān) is an American engineer and entrepreneur who was CEO of Reddit from March 2012 until his resignation in November 2014. With Niniane Wang, he is also co-founder of the Mountain View coworking space Sunfire Offices, and was an advisor at Quora. Wong was briefly a contributing blogger to Forbes magazine.

== Career ==
=== PayPal and Facebook ===
Wong worked as a senior engineering manager at PayPal from 2001 to 2005. He is a member of PayPal's early group of employees known collectively as the PayPal Mafia. In 2005, he joined Facebook as a director of engineering on projects including crowd translation. Before leaving Facebook in 2010, he became an active Reddit user and posted often.

=== Reddit CEO ===
After three months of talks with Reddit in late 2011, Wong was offered the position of CEO, an offer which he claims friends met with "uproarious laughter".

In 2012, when asked about various controversial Reddit communities, Wong said that the site should offer a platform for objectionable content: "We will not ban legal content even if we find it odious or if we personally condemn it." In 2013, he hired Ellen Pao as the Vice President of Business Development and Strategic Partnerships and later recommended her as CEO.

In 2014, Reddit board member and YC president Sam Altman announced that Wong was leaving the company, after being unable to garner support for a proposal to move the Reddit office from San Francisco to Daly City. Reportedly, Wong "stopped showing up at the office" when the board of directors ignored his proposal. Wong, who thought newer employees would prefer to work in a less expensive area, stated that before the disagreement he had considered leaving due to an abundance of stress.

=== Terraformation ===
In 2020, Wong founded Terraformation to combat global warming through reforestation.

== Personal life ==
Wong is a graduate of Mounds View High School in Arden Hills, Minnesota, and of Carnegie Mellon University in Pittsburgh, Pennsylvania. He is married to Kimberly Algeri-Wong, who holds a Master of Fine Arts in screenwriting.

Wong supported Barack Obama and spoke favorably about Obama's familiarity with the Internet.
