= R/science =

Science subreddit

r/science
- Website type: Subreddit
- Available in: English
- Founder: u/spez
- Website: www.reddit.com/r/science
- Users: 33 million members
- Launched: October 18, 2006; 19 years ago

r/science is an Internet forum on Reddit where the community of participants discuss science topics. A popular feature of the forum is "Ask Me Anything" (AMA) public discussions. As of 2014, r/science attracted 30,000–100,000 visitors per day, making it the largest community-managed science forum and an attractive place to host discussions. It has over 33 million members as of 2024.

== History ==
Nathan Allen speaks about r/science to the American Chemical Society.

=== Nathan Allen ===
Nathan Allen is an American chemist. While working as a chemist at Dow Chemical Company, Allen began to imagine that scientists could use Reddit's "ask me anything" (AMA) interview format to create discussions between scientists and the public. Allen became a forum moderator there and has since been prominent in guiding the culture of the community there and as a spokesperson for the forum. Allen has advocated that chemists should be more active in communicating with the public in online forums such as reddit.

=== AMA series ===
As of 2014, r/science attracted 30,000–100,000 visitors per day, making it the largest community-managed science forum and an attractive place to host discussions. In January 2014 Allen began the r/science AMA series with the goal of raising the visibility of scientists who are producing groundbreaking work in their fields but who are not well known outside of their fields. Outgoing links posted in the forum must go to peer-reviewed science articles published within the last six months.

The discussion series was instantly a success, and established the world's largest two-way discussion between scientists and the public. Allen does most of the organization for the talks, including soliciting scientists to participate and training them to communicate in reddit's discussion format.

In May 2018, the series ended due to a change in Reddit's ranking algorithm making AMA talks less visible and less engaging.

== Featured content ==
r/science has an ongoing content partnership with PLOS. As an academic journal, PLOS invites authors who are publishing scientific papers to publicly present their work in r/science and to participate in community "ask me anything" discussions in the forum at scheduled times.

== Editorial decisions ==
Editorial decisions in r/science are made by the moderators who themselves follow rules that they present for the forum. If new rules are introduced then those are discussed with the community of readers. Rules for r/science include guidance that contributors keep discussion on-topic and thoughtful.

Allen led the decision to ban discussion in r/science which gives credibility to climate change denial.
