= Alexandria Lafci =

American social entrepreneur

Alexandria Lafci is an American social entrepreneur and venture capitalist dedicated to closing the housing gap. For her efforts towards building affordable housing, she has been named a Forbes 30 Under 30.

== Early life ==
Alexandria Lafci grew up in Section 8 housing and endured housing instability growing up.

She attended Boston University where she graduated with a bachelor's degree in international relations.

== Career ==
After graduating from college, she worked for Teach For America for two years teaching sixth grade English, and then worked in operations management for an industrial supply firm in Atlanta. She has said that nearly one-third of all the students she taught in Washington, DC experienced homelessness during the school year.

=== New Story ===
In 2014, Lafci met her co-founders at a social entrepreneurship gathering, and they started the non-profit New Story with the aim to build affordable homes for people living with inadequate shelter. They applied and were accepted into Y Combinator in 2015. Since then, New Story has built more than 2,000 homes across Haiti, El Salvador, Mexico, and Bolivia; it focuses on building clusters of houses and gives full ownership to families. New Story has partnered with 3-D printing companies and has stated that they can print a new, 600 square foot home for under $4,000 within 24 hours.

=== Hometeam Ventures ===
In 2021, Lafci founded the venture fund Hometeam Ventures with the goal of investing into startups in the construction and housing industries in order to close the housing gap. The fund raised $18 million, which is one of the largest fundraises for a Black female general partner; a notable investor was Alexis Ohanian.
