= Libertad =

Libertad (Spanish, 'freedom') or La Libertad may refer to:

== Arts, entertainment and media ==
=== Fictional characters ===
- Libertad, in the comic strip Mafalda
- Libertad, in the video game Far Cry 6

=== Film and television ===
- La Libertad (film), or Freedom, a 2001 Argentine film
- Libertad (film), a 2021 Spanish-Belgian film
- Libertad (TV series), a 2021 Spanish TV series
- Libertad, the merged tribe on Survivor: Nicaragua
- Libertad, a starship in the 2006 anime series Strain: Strategic Armored Infantry

=== Literature ===
- Libertad (newspaper), in Valladolid, Spain, 1931–1979
- Libertad Digital, a Spanish-language online newspaper
- La Libertad (Spain), a Spanish newspaper 1919–1939
- La Libertad (Colombian newspaper), a newspaper in Colombia

=== Music ===
- Libertad (Delirious? album), 2002
- Libertad (La Ley album), 2003
- Libertad (Velvet Revolver album), 2007
- "Libertad" (song), a 2005 single by Ivy Queen
- "Libertad", a 2011 song by Anahí and Christian Chávez
- "Libertad", a song by Breed 77 from the 2006 album In My Blood (En Mi Sangre)
- "Libertad", a 1995 song by Kairo
- "Libertad", a song by Tribal Seeds from the 2009 album The Harvest
- "La Libertad" (song), by Álvaro Solera, 2019

== Places ==
=== Argentina ===
- Libertad, Buenos Aires
- Libertad Department, Chaco

=== Colombia ===
- La Libertad, Colombia
- La Libertad Province

=== Ecuador ===
- Libertad, Ecuador, damaged in the 1949 Ambato earthquake
- La Libertad, Ecuador
  - La Libertad Canton

=== El Salvador ===
- La Libertad Department (El Salvador)
  - La Libertad, La Libertad

=== Guatemala ===
- La Libertad, Huehuetenango
- La Libertad, Petén

=== Honduras ===
- La Libertad, Comayagua
- La Libertad, Francisco Morazán

=== Mexico ===
- Libertad, Chihuahua, Jiménez Municipality, Chihuahua
- La Libertad, Chiapas
- Libertad, Tabasco, Paraíso, Tabasco
- La Libertad, Veracruz, a town affected by Tropical Storm Jose (2005)

=== Nicaragua ===
- La Libertad, Nicaragua

=== Peru ===
- Department of La Libertad

=== Philippines ===
- Libertad, Antique
- Libertad, Butuan, Caraga
- Libertad, Misamis Oriental
- La Libertad, Negros Oriental
- La Libertad, Zamboanga del Norte
- Libertad, Pasay, National Capital Region
  - Libertad station

=== United States ===
- La Libertad, California

=== Uruguay ===
- Libertad, Uruguay

=== Venezuela ===
- Libertad Municipality, Anzoátegui
- Libertad Municipality, Táchira, Táchira
- Libertad, Barinas, Rojas Municipality, Barinas
- Libertad, Cojedes, Ricaurte Municipality, Cojedes

== Ships ==
- Libertad (1847 schooner), chartered by the U.S. Navy during the Mexican–American War
- Chilean battleship Libertad, later HMS Triumph
- ARA Libertad, several ships of the Argentine Navy

== Sports ==
- Club Libertad, a Paraguayan football club
- Libertad de Trujillo, a Peruvian football club
- Club Deportivo Libertad, an Argentinian basketball club
- Libertad F.C. (Ecuador), a football club
- Libertad F.C. (El Salvador), a defunct professional football club from La Libertad

== Other uses ==
- Libertad (name), including a list of people with the surname or given name
  - Albert Libertad (Joseph Albert, 1875–1908), known as Albert Libertad or Libertad, anarchist and writer
- Libertad (coin), gold and silver bullion coins issued by Mexico
- Libertad (crater), on the planet Mars
- Libertad Formation, a geologic formation in Uruguay
- Liberty Movement (Movimiento Libertad), a political party in Peru

== See also ==
- Land and liberty (disambiguation) (¡Tierra y Libertad!)
- Helms–Burton Act, the Cuban Liberty and Democratic Solidarity (Libertad) Act of 1996
- Libertad 1, a Colombian satellite
