= To Be or Not to Be (book) =

Choose your own adventure book by Ryan North

To Be or Not To Be
- Author: Ryan North
- Illustrator: various
- Cover artist: Ray Fawkes, ND Stevenson
- Language: English
- Subject: Characters Hamlet, Ophelia, King Hamlet, Claudius, Gertrude, Rosencrantz and Guildenstern, Polonius, Laertes, Horatio
- Genre: Comedy
- Publisher: Breadpig
- Publication date: 2013
- Pages: 740
- ISBN: 978-0-9828537-4-0
- Followed by: Romeo and/or Juliet

To Be or Not to Be: A Chooseable-Path Adventure, also referred to as To Be or Not to Be: That Is the Adventure, is a 2013 novel by Ryan North, retelling the story of Shakespeare's Hamlet in a choose your own adventure format and mostly contemporary language. The initial run of the book was crowd funded through Kickstarter and published by charitable "uncorporation" Breadpig. It was eventually followed by two sequels, also by North, Romeo and/or Juliet and William Shakespeare Punches a Friggin' Shark and/or Other Stories.

== Development ==
North posted To Be or Not to Be: That Is the Adventure to Kickstarter on November 21, 2012, with a fundraising goal of $20,000, which was reached in three and a half hours. North promised stretch rewards for higher fundraising amounts reached, including improving the book to be created and further prizes for backers. One promise originally made in jest was at the $500,000 level: "I will literally explode (literally)". Although made in jest, this promise was fulfilled with the assistance of Site 3 coLaboratory, where a 3D scan was taken of North's head, a replica 3D-printed out of blue plastic, and that replica exploded using a dry ice pellet in a plastic bottle. North said that calling the response "'amazing and incredible' would almost be underselling it." By the close of the 30-day fundraising period, the project had raised $580,905, making it the most funded Kickstarter publishing project (second-most as of May 2013). The book was mailed to backers in August 2013, three months after the original proposed date. A prequel story titled Poor Yorick, illustrated by Tyson Hesse, was made available to backers.

Wired referred to the book's successful Kickstarter campaign as "a demonstration of the power of new media", considering it the type of project that could not have succeeded under a more traditional publishing model.

== Structure ==
To Be or Not to Be offers the reader the option to play as one of three characters: Hamlet, Ophelia, or Hamlet Sr., King of Denmark. From there the story branches frequently, with some options following the course of the original play and others providing the choice to give up on the quest to kill King Claudius, or to follow other pursuits (Ophelia, for example, is a keen scientist who can invent indoor heating, and King Hamlet, as a ghost, can choose to explore the ocean floor or tame the ghosts of dinosaurs). The choices that follow Shakespeare's play are marked with little "Yorick skulls". The story can reach any of 110 endings, each illustrated in colour by one of a wide variety of artists, including fellow webcomic artists Kate Beaton, Christopher Hastings, Jeph Jacques and Randall Munroe, among many others.

The book features references to other works, including other plays of Shakespeare's (in one ending, Hamlet returns to the University of Wittenberg, befriends classmate T. J. Macbeth who nicknames Hamlet "Banquo", and returns with him to Scotland) and more recent pop culture. Occasionally the player can switch control between characters, such as taking over as Hamlet after his father has succeeded in convincing him to kill Claudius, playing as Claudius while reading a "The Adventure is Chosen by You" book-within-a-book based on play-within-a-play The Murder of Gongazo, or having a brief adventure as Horatio.

Reviewers noted that the choose your own adventure format of the book proved to be a good fit for the themes of the original Shakespeare play. Lev Grossman of Time stated that "Hamlet is all about the difficulty of choosing your own adventure: it's a story about a man caught between the urgent necessity of action and the existential impossibility of making decisions". Slate's Alison Hallett referred to the "To be, or not to be" soliloquy of the original, noting that the book "puts the being vs. not-being decision square in the reader's hands".

== Adaptation ==
An interactive fiction video game adaptation of the book, published by Tin Man Games, was released in 2015 for PC and iOS. The iOS version received a Metacritic score of 93, indicating "universal acclaim".
