= Lu Qi =

Lu Qi is the name of:

- Lu Qi (Tang dynasty) (fl. 8th century), Tang dynasty official
- Lu Qi (actor) (born 1953), Chinese actor
- Lu Qi (computer scientist) (born 1961), Chinese computer scientist
