= Mister Splashy Pants =

Humpback whale who is popular online

- The Mister Splashy Pants logo, created by Reddit co-founder Alexis Ohanian, that gained fame on the internet
- Species: Humpback whale (Megaptera novaeangliae)
- Sex: Male
- Born: Before 2007
- Known for: Tracking by Greenpeace and naming by Reddit users
- Residence: Southern Ocean and South Pacific Ocean, south of New Zealand

Mister Splashy Pants, or Mr Splashypants, is a humpback whale in the South Pacific Ocean. It is being tracked with a satellite tag by Greenpeace as a part of its Great Whale Trail Expedition, which was working to raise awareness about whales threatened by the Japanese Fisheries Agency's hunting of 50 humpback whales annually. The whale's name was chosen in an online poll that garnered attention from several websites, including Boing Boing and Reddit, quickly becoming an internet meme. Mister Splashy Pants became the subject of a TED Talk by Reddit co-founder Alexis Ohanian, titled "How to make a splash in social media."

== History ==
Greenpeace humpback whale naming poll, 2007
- November–December 2007
- Website: greenpeace.org

Results
Mister Splashy Pants	79.58%
Humphrey	2.87%
Others	17.55%
- Assuming 150,000 votes total

Originally, Greenpeace had accepted 30 names for voting. Among the more unusual names was what was possibly intended as a joke, "Mr. Splashy Pants". On 26 November 2007, a user with an IP address in Arizona, United States found that disabling cookies removed any voting limits, and the user began voting at 120 votes per minute for 38 minutes without pause.

The massive leap in votes for the name attracted the attention of b3ta.com, 4chan's /b/ board, BoingBoing, reddit, Digg, and numerous blogs. Though Greenpeace removed the extra votes from the results, users from the social networking sites flocked to vote for the name, and the percentage moved quickly from 5 percent to 75 percent in less than a day. In response to the spike, Greenpeace decided to hold the competition open for an extra week, until 7 December. Reddit took the voting so seriously that they temporarily changed their logo to feature Mr. Splashy Pants. Facebook also began garnering interest, and a Facebook application was created with the tagline "Vote your conscience, vote Splashy Pants." On the 30th, Fark posted a thread linking to the voting as well, and for a few days internet traffic on the Greenpeace server spiked to almost untenable levels.

There was some controversy over the naming, with TreeHugger and an associated blog initially claiming that the name was not beautiful enough, and seeking to instigate votes for the other names. According to Greenpeace insider Brian Fitzgerald, the name also was controversial within the organisation.

On 10 December 2007, Mister Splashy Pants was announced as the winner of the competition. Voters reportedly numbered 150,000 people and 'Splashy' received 119,367, over 78 percent of the votes. The nearest rival, Humphrey, received 4,329 votes, or less than 3 percent. The other top ten names—Aiko, Libertad, Mira, Kaimana, Aurora, Shanti, Amal and Manami—received less than 1 percent each. Reddit alone was responsible for 20,322 of the votes.

=== Outcome ===
After their initial reluctance, Greenpeace embraced the result of the popular vote and used the name at the center of its campaign. The added publicity, at no cost to Greenpeace, gave it enough impact to convince the Japanese government, and the plan to hunt humpback whales was abandoned in December 2007.

In Campaign Magazine, advertising figure Russell Davies praised Greenpeace's handling of the campaign as "one of the defining moments in New Media marketing." The name has since spawned clothing, logos, Flash videos, and the slogan "Save Mister Splashy Pants."

== Pop-culture references ==
- On 6 November 2009, in Mysore, India, Alexis Ohanian presented a TED Talk at TED India entitled "How to make a splash in social media" about the Mister Splashy Pants saga. His conclusion was, that on the Web, "You lose control over your message, − and that's OK."
- Mister Splashy Pants features in a novel by Jenni Barrett entitled Look into the Eye. The author was the top peer-to-peer fundraiser for the Greenpeace Great Whale Trail campaign, and so got to name one of the other Humpbacks in the study. She chose SIDD, an acronym of the names of three Irish crewmembers and a blogger on board the Greenpeace ship Esperanza.

== See also ==
- List of Internet phenomena
- List of individual cetaceans
- Meme
- Boaty McBoatface
