= Garry Tan =

American venture capitalist (born 1981)

- 陳嘉興
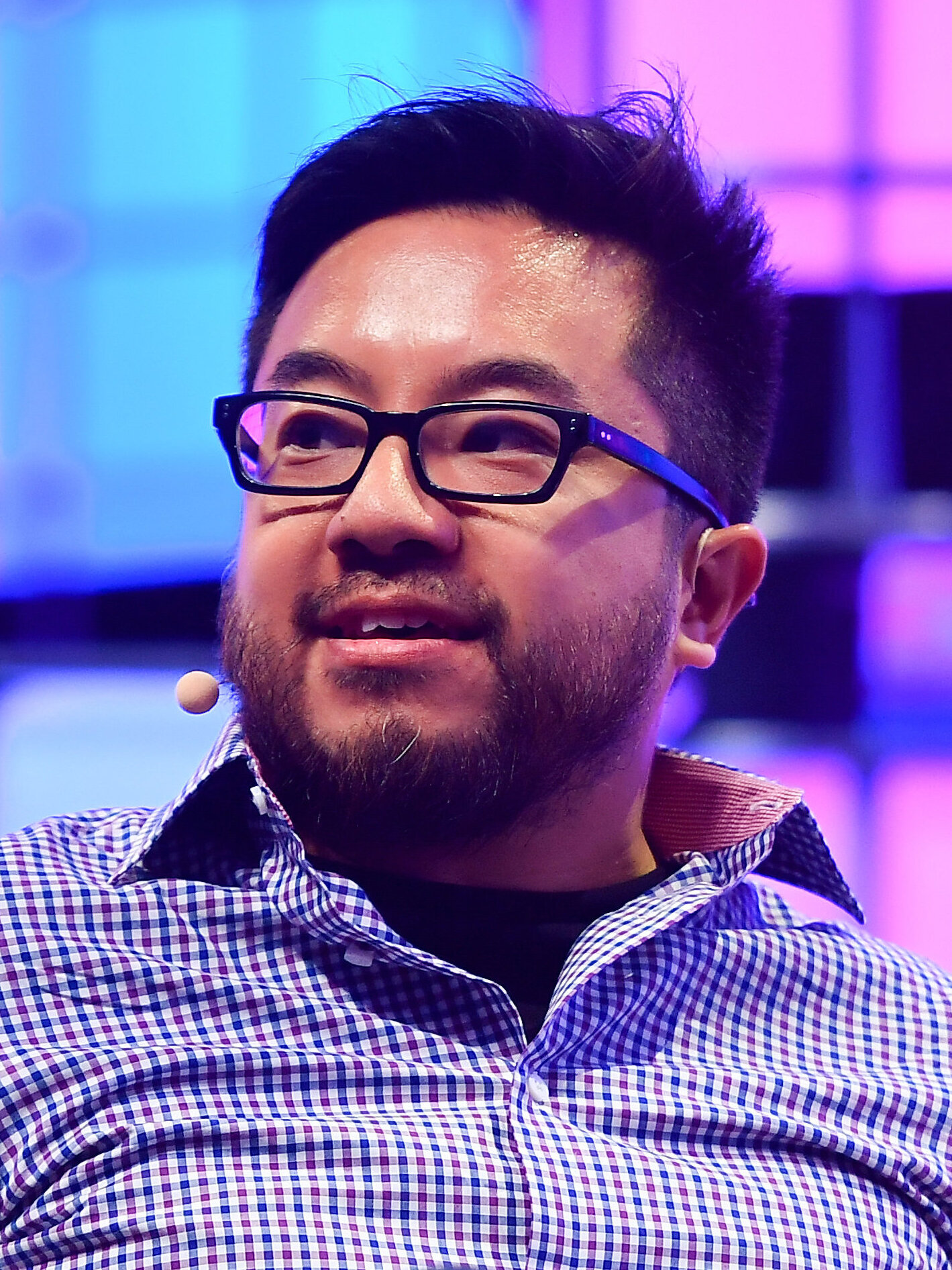
- Tan at Web Summit 2018
- Born: 1981 (age 44–45); Winnipeg, Canada
- Education: Stanford University (BS)
- Occupation: Venture capitalist
- Known for: Y Combinator; Posterous; Posthaven; Initialized Capital

Chinese name
- Traditional Chinese: 陳嘉興
- Simplified Chinese: 陈嘉兴
Transcriptions
Standard Mandarin
- Hanyu Pinyin: Chén Jiāxìng
Southern Min
- Hokkien POJ: Tân Ka-heng

Garry Tan (Chinese: 陳嘉興; pinyin: Chén Jiāxìng; Pe̍h-ōe-jī: Tân Ka-heng; born 1981) is a Canadian-American venture capitalist who is the CEO of the startup accelerator Y Combinator and a founder of the venture capital fund Initialized Capital. He previously co-founded Posterous and Posthaven. He was an early employee at Palantir Technologies, and previously a partner at Y Combinator. Tan is also known for his engagement in San Francisco politics, both as a commenter on social media and as a political donor.

== Early life and education ==
Tan was born in 1981 to a Chinese Singaporean father and a Burmese Chinese mother in Winnipeg, Canada. His father worked in a machine shop as a foreman, and his mother was a nursing assistant. The family settled in Fremont, California, in 1991, and Tan graduated from American High School. He started programming at 14 and claims he found his first job by cold-calling the Yellow Pages.

He attended Stanford University from 1999 to 2003, and graduated with a bachelor's degree in computer systems engineering.

== Career ==
Tan worked at Microsoft and then became the tenth employee at Palantir Technologies. In 2008, Tan co-founded Posterous, a blogging platform, which was acquired by Twitter in 2012 for $20 million. He co-founded Posthaven after the shutdown of Posterous. He joined Y Combinator in 2011 as a designer in residence and partner. At Y Combinator, Tan helped compile a directory of "the best and the brightest interaction designers and visual designers" and wrote Coinbase's first seed round check in 2012. While at Y Combinator, Tan and fellow Y Combinator partners raised $7 million in venture capital funding to support Y Combinator alumni companies, including Instacart and Coinbase.

Tan was a founder of Initialized Capital, a venture capital fund. In 2012, Tan, Harj Taggar, and Alexis Ohanian operated Initialized Capital's $7 million first fund, followed by a $39 million second fund in 2013. In 2016, Initialized Capital raised a $115 million third fund. The latest fund was closed in December 2021 for $700 million. Through Initialized, Tan led investments in Instacart, Coinbase, and Flexport.

Tan has been listed on the Forbes Midas List from 2018–2022.

In August 2022, Y Combinator announced that Tan would become president of the company in January 2023, replacing Geoff Ralston. As president, Tan restructured Y Combinator’s investment operations by winding down its Continuity Fund and transferring follow-on investment decisions to group partners. He also initiated a consolidated fundraising effort with a stated goal of raising $2 billion across new funds.

== Politics ==
Tan has been actively involved and influential in San Francisco politics, both by directing attention to various topics via his social media presence and through donations totaling to approximately $400,000 as of March 2024. Examples of causes espoused by Tan include increased funding for police to deal with property crime, opposition to regulation of self-driving cars, changes to education, decelerationism, Apple's monopoly on apps, and censorship by YouTube. Tan self identifies as a "moderate Democrat".

Tan has especially focused on increased housing development in San Francisco. Tan began making donations to YIMBY housing activists in 2015 and became more politically active during the COVID-19 pandemic in 2020. Tan has focused his political giving primarily on housing development, public schools, and public safety. In 2020, Tan said in an interview that he supported housing of all kinds, including market-rate housing, affordable housing, and homeless shelters. As part of his political funding, he has supported San Francisco Bay Area Renters' Federation, YIMBY Action, and YIMBY Law.

Tan has served a board member of GrowSF, a San Francisco pro-growth political group, donating at least $54,500 to the organization. He promoted and raised funds for the recall of members of the San Francisco School Board. Tan himself donated $20,000 to the campaign, and fundraised from friends like Cyan Banister. He promoted the recall and raised money from his Twitter following.

Tan supported the 2022 recall campaign against progressive San Francisco District Attorney Chesa Boudin. Tan donated at least $100,000 to the effort. Tan blamed Boudin for physical attacks on Asians. Tan alleged that Boudin failed to hold violent criminal offenders accountable and failed to protect the general public, particularly the least advantaged. After the recall campaign succeeded, Tan supported the election of appointed District Attorney Brooke Jenkins, and appointed Supervisor Matt Dorsey. Tan has also encouraged tech leaders to participate in San Francisco local politics in 2023.

Tan is known for his controversial, "bombastic" and "pugnacious" presence on X (formerly Twitter), where he is vocally critical of San Francisco politicians and other figures who oppose his policy recommendations. In 2024 Tan made a tweet saying "die slow motherfuckers" (a reference to a Tupac lyric) aimed at seven members of the San Francisco Board of Supervisors, including Myrna Melgar, Aaron Peskin, Dean Preston, Connie Chan and Ahsha Safaí. Tan later apologised for the tweet and deleted it, which had resulted death threats being sent towards the supervisors. Several police reports were filed about the tweet.

Tan is vocally critical towards what he describes as legacy media, specifically newspapers. He has described The New York Times as upholding "Woke Capital". Tan is known for having blocked tens of thousands of accounts on Twitter/X, including public figures and journalists who have never interacted with him.

== Personal life ==
As of 2023, Tan lived in Noe Valley, San Francisco, with his wife and two children. Tan is a Christian. In July 2026, Tan announced in a Facebook post that he was divorced.
