= Throwing Fits =

American fashion podcast

- Format: Audio • video
- Country of origin: United States
- Language: English

Cast and voices
- Hosted by: James Harris; Lawrence Schlossman

Publication
- Original release: 10 January 2020

Related
- Website: www.throwingfits.com

Throwing Fits is a menswear and culture podcast created by James Harris and Lawrence Schlossman in 2020. The show features interviews with guests from the entertainment, fashion, and media industries.

== History ==
Harris and Schlossman met in 2011 while working at a fashion public relations and event agency. In 2012, and both joined Complex Media, where they launched the video series, Fashion Bros in 2014. Their podcast began in 2016, as a side project recorded at Grailed, where Schlossman was brand director. The show, originally titled Failing Upwards, and was acquired by Barstool Sports in 2017. After leaving Barstool due to disagreements about the business and its shared advertising revenue model, the hosts rebranded the podcast as Throwing Fits in 2020.

== Collaborations and projects ==
In 2023, the show partnered with GANT to present a curated archive installation in New York City.

In 2024, Harris and Schlossman worked with online menswear retailer Mr Porter to curate 74 items of apparel, accessories, and footwear from 13 brands, and produced a selection of Throwing Fits merchandise.

In the same year, the hosts partnered with C.P. Company on a capsule collection.

== Notable guests ==
In June 2025, New York City mayoral candidate Zohran Mamdani appeared on Throwing Fits.
