= Initialized Capital =

American venture capital fund

Initialized Capital Management, LLC
- Type: Private
- Industry: Venture capital
- Founded: 2011; 15 years ago
- Founder: Harj Taggar; Garry Tan; Alexis Ohanian
- Headquarters: San Francisco, California, United States
- Key people: Brett Gibson (Managing Partner)
- Website: initialized.com

Initialized Capital is a venture capital fund founded in 2011 and headquartered in San Francisco. It was founded by Alexis Ohanian, Harj Taggar, and Garry Tan.

As of 2021, it has raised more than $3.2 billion in assets.

Initialized Capital has 27 portfolio companies it invested in at seed that have since become unicorns, including Coinbase, Ro, Cruise Automation, Instacart, Flexport, Opendoor, Algolia, Goat Group, Color Health, Flock Safety, Patreon, Reddit, Rippling, Athelas, and CoinTracker.

== History ==
Initialized raised $7 million in its first fund. In February 2012, it filed its Form D notice of exempt offering of securities. It raised $39 million in its second fund in August 2013.

In 2013, Initialized Capital became an early investor in Coinbase, wiring the cryptocurrency app's founder Brian Armstrong $200,000. Garry Tan left Y Combinator in 2015 to focus on Initialized full time.

On June 7, 2016, the firm announced a $100M target for its third fund and then closed $125 million.

In late 2018, it raised a $225 million fund, the company's fourth.

In June 2020, Ohanian ended his role as managing partner at Initialized.

In August 2020, the firm raised $230 million, the company's fifth round.

In December 2021, Initialized Capital completed its sixth funding round, raising $700 million to invest in startups.

In August 2022, it was announced that Garry Tan would be stepping back to re-join Y Combinator as CEO. Jen Wolf and Brett Gibson took over leadership of the firm in Tan's absence. In October 2024, Jen Wolf left the firm. Brett Gibson is the managing partner of Initialized Capital, overseeing investment strategy and operations.

== Recognition ==
Garry Tan has been listed on the Forbes Midas List from 2018 to 2022.
