= New Story =

New story, A New Story, or New Stories may refer to:

== Media ==
- New Stories from the South, annual compilation of short stories published by Algonquin Books of Chapel Hill
- A New Story (Jersey Shore), TV episode
- A New Story, album by Kanon (singer)

== Organizations ==
- New Story (charity), a non-profit organization
