= Qai Qai =

Doll belonging to Alexis Olympia Ohanian

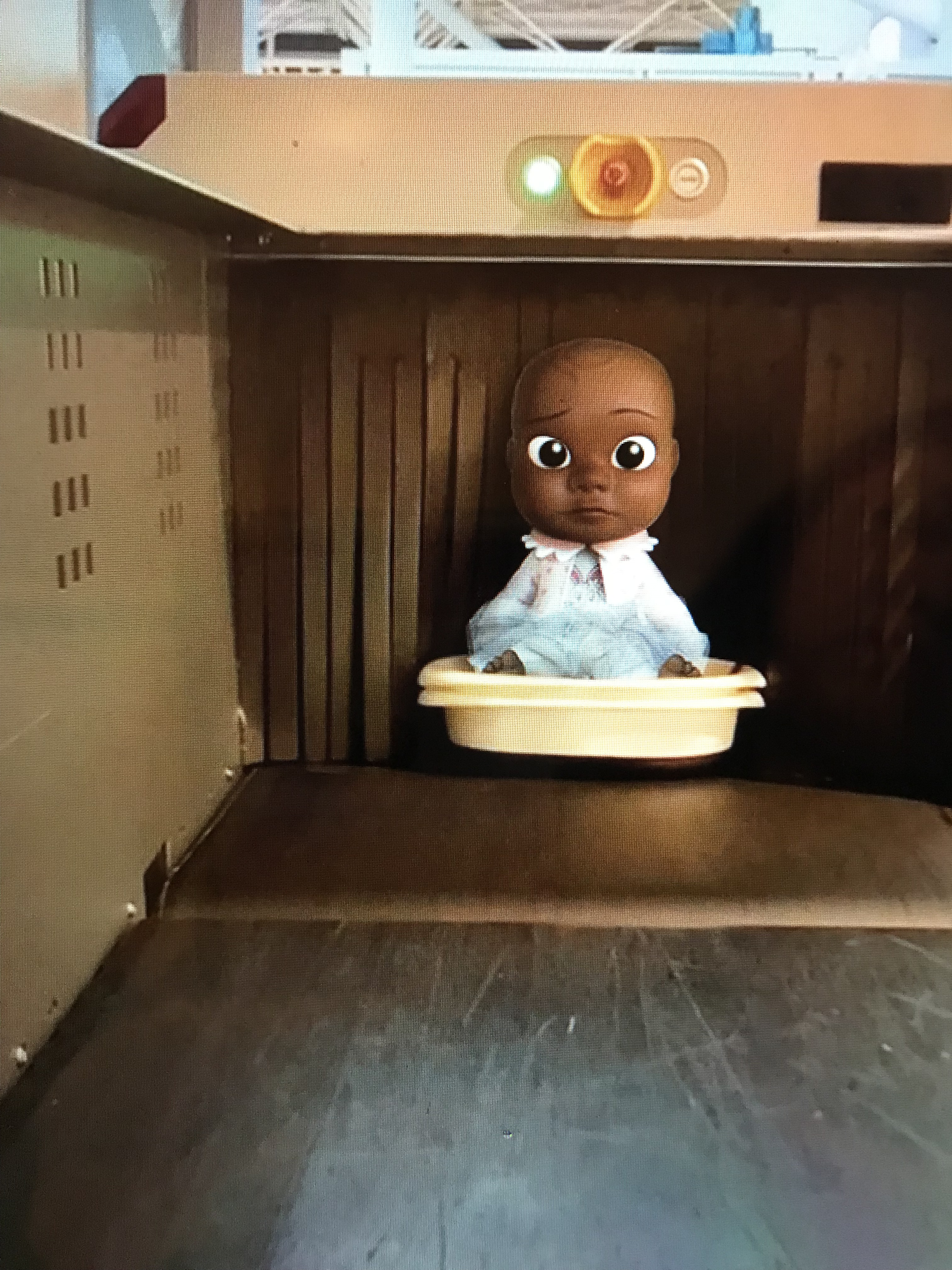
- Qai Qai digitized

Qai Qai (/ˈkweɪkweɪ/) is a doll belonging to Alexis Olympia Ohanian, the daughter of American professional tennis player and winner of 23 Grand Slam titles, Serena Williams, and co-founder of Reddit and Initialized Capital, Alexis Ohanian Sr. The doll became popular on social media in 2018, with many pictures of her face digitized and animated to have various expressions.

Alexis Ohanian and Serena Williams' daughter, Olympia, was born on September 1, 2017, in West Palm Beach, Florida. When Williams bought the doll for Olympia, she indicated that she wanted her daughter's first doll to be black because growing up, she did not have many opportunities to own a black doll. Qai Qai got her name from Williams's nephew.

Qai Qai's first post on her own Instagram was on August 22, 2018, where she is lying on the floor. While likely run by Williams and Ohanian Sr., it is unknown who administers the doll's account.

Qai Qai has been featured in several USA Today articles, Today and Oprah magazine, the last of which she did an exclusive interview. On September 23, 2021, Alexis Ohanian was interviewed by PEOPLE, discussing Qai Qai and a new digital coloring book.

Qai Qai is portrayed as a physical doll and has a digitized version with a full personality. Qai Qai appears animated facial expressions digitally created and inserted into photographs and has over 3.1 million followers on TikTok. As of October 2020, Qai Qai dolls were being sold by Amazon.

== See also ==
- Baby Nancy
