= Posterous =

Simple blogging platform

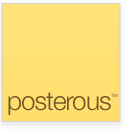
- Website type: Blogging platform, Lifestreaming
- Founders: Sachin Agarwal, Garry Tan
- Industry: Internet
- Services: Microblogging, social media integration (Twitter, Facebook, Flickr), URL shortening
- Parent: Twitter (acquired 2012)
- Registration: Required
- Launched: May 2008
- Current status: Defunct

Posterous was a simple blogging platform started in May 2008. It supported integrated and automatic posting to other social media tools such as Flickr, Twitter, and Facebook, a built-in Google Analytics package, and custom themes. It was based in San Francisco and funded by Y Combinator.

Updating to Posterous was similar to other blogging platforms. Posting could be done by logging into the website's rich text editor, but it was particularly designed for mobile blogging. Mobile methods include sending an email, with attachments of photos, MP3s, documents, and video (both links and files). Many social media pundits considered Posterous to be the leading free application for lifestreaming. The platform received wide attention when leading social media expert Steve Rubel declared he was moving his blogging activity entirely to Posterous.

Posterous also had its own URL shortening service, which as of March 2010 could post to Twitter.

Posterous allowed users to point the DNS listing for a domain name or subdomain they already owned to their Posterous account, allowing them to have a site hosted by Posterous that used their own domain name.

In January 2010, the3six5, a Posterous-based storytelling project, launched. It was nominated for a Webby Award in 2011.

Posterous shut down in April 2013, after being acquired by Twitter the previous year.

== E-mail spoofing ==
Posterous allowed posting of content directly to one's blog via e-mail, choosing where to put the content based on the return address of the e-mail. While this feature was very convenient, return e-mail addresses are easily spoofed, allowing for malicious users to post unwanted content on another person's blog. Posterous claimed that they could filter out messages not actually sent by the account holder through other means besides the return address. They did not publish their methods, but it appears that they used a combination of SPF-checking and filters on e-mail headers to verify that the e-mail client or machine from which the e-mails were sent are similar to previously verified e-mails. Posterous did not offer any options for the user to require confirmation on all posts, no matter who sends them.

In June 2008, a blog post on TechCrunch challenged its readers to try to spoof the author's Posterous blog. Three posters were successful, out of quite a few attempts, but Posterous quickly fixed the security hole which allowed these posts to go through.

== Mobile ==
In August 2009, Posterous launched PicPosterous, an iPhone application for quickly posting photos to a posterous page.

In January 2011, Posterous launched an app for the Android platform which was supported by 9 different phone models.

== Shutdown ==
Posterous agreed to be shut down on March 12, 2012, after it was announced that much of the team was acquired by Twitter.

On February 15, 2013, Posterous announced that they would be shutting down the service on April 30, 2013. Users would be able to back up and export their contents to other blogging platforms. Following the shutdown, Posterous URLs displayed a "bye" page showing an image of an astronaut with a spanner and a satellite. As of May 2013, Posterous founders were developing a similar but paid service called Posthaven. Until the Posterous API was shut down, Posterous users could export their data to their new Posthaven account. Posthaven pledged that they would never be acquired and were not looking for any investors.

== See also ==
- Y Combinator
