= Harj Taggar =

Founder, entrepreneur, and investor

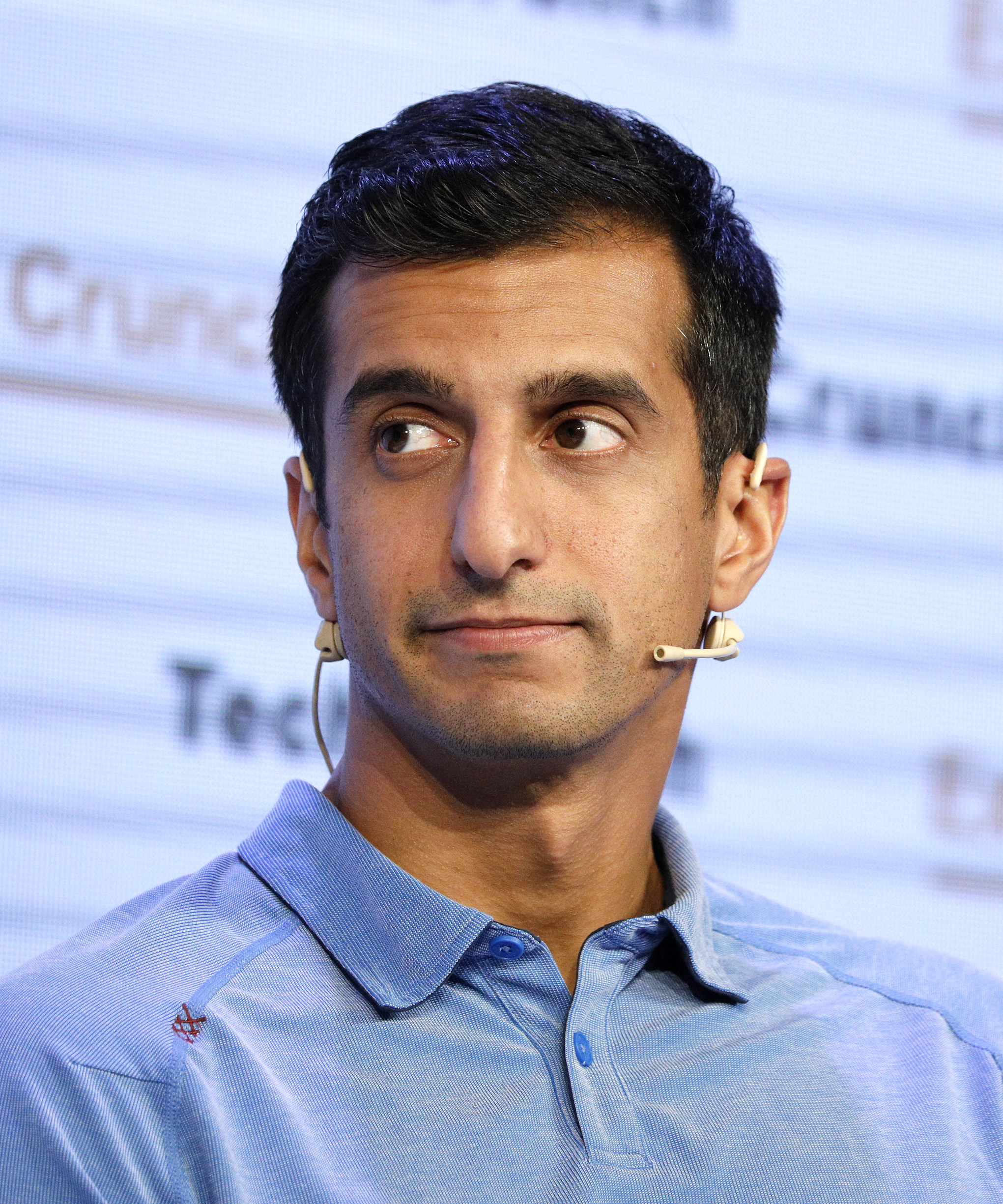
- Taggar in 2019
- Born: Harjeet Taggar; 1984 or 1985 (age 40–41)
- Occupations: Founder; Entrepreneur; Investor
- Employer: Y Combinator
- Known for: Startups: Auctomatic, Triplebyte 0

Harj Taggar (born 1984 or 1985) is an entrepreneur and investor. In 2007, he co-founded Auctomatic, a platform for online sellers, and in 2015, he co-founded Triplebyte, a technical hiring platform designed to assess the skills of those looking for jobs as software engineer regardless of background.

Taggar was also the first non-founder Partner at the startup accelerator, Y Combinator, having first joined in 2010. After co-founding and leading Triplebyte for several years, he returned as a Group Partner in 2020. He is also an angel investor, having co-founded Initialized Capital with Garry Tan and Alexis Ohanian.

== Education ==
Taggar attended the University of Oxford's law school for a few years. In 2006, Taggar left law school in order to move to Silicon Valley and follow through on a business idea he had which would eventually become Auctomatic.

== Career ==
In 2007, Taggar co-founded Auctomatic, a platform for online sellers to manage auctions and marketplace listings online, with his brother Kulveer as well as Patrick Collison and John Collison. It was on-boarded to Y Combinator that same year. Since Taggar and his co-founders were "non-technical," Y Combinator accepted them with the condition that one of them learned programming; Taggar was the one who eventually learned. One year later, Auctomatic was acquired by Live Current Media.

Taggar joined Y Combinator in 2010; he was one of its first non-founder Partners. There, Taggar was frequently interviewed in publications like TechCrunch, Business Insider, and Fast Company where he shared his thoughts on startup accelerators, what makes startups successful, and considerations for pitching companies to investors, among other topics. In 2015, he coined the term "second-time founder syndrome":

... you've seen all of these ideas, and so you really want to obviously work on the one that’s going to be a huge success... you can start thinking a lot more about which ideas are going to sound impressive when you tell other people who understand startups that you’re hanging out with.

In 2011, Taggar became an angel investor through the joint fund, Initialized Capital, which he co-founded with Garry Tan and Alexis Ohanian. In 2013, they pooled $39 million to put into startups.

In 2015, Taggar, along with Ammon Bartram and Guillaume Luccisano, co-founded Triplebyte, a hiring platform to assess the technical skills of software engineers, especially those without established education backgrounds at "traditionally well-known colleges." While at Y Combinator, Taggar had begun envisioning new systems and processes to reach, interview, and hire engineers, including an "interviewing checklist" which Y Combinator still uses. Taggar's insights into how to modernize recruiting would thus inform Triplebyte's foundation. Taggar also stated that the platform was intended to help software engineers identify how to grow their skills.

The same year that Taggar, Bartram, and Luccisano co-founded Triplebyte, it was on-boarded to Y Combinator. By 2018, the company raised $10 million in a Series A funding round spearheaded by Initialized Capital. One year later, it raised millions of dollars in several other rounds of seed funding with backing from YC Continuity and other investors. Over 500 companies have since have used Triplebyte to hire over a thousand employees, including Adobe, Box, Instacart, Uber, Dropbox, American Express.

In 2020, Taggar returned to Y Combinator as a Group Partner.
