= MiraclePlus =

Chinese venture capital firm

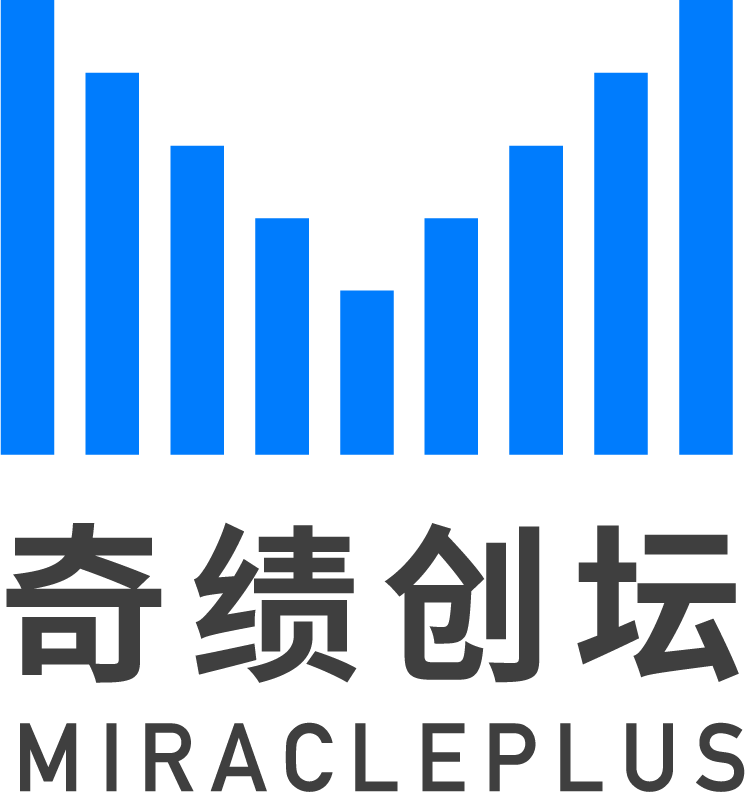
- Native name: 奇绩创坛
- Formerly: Y Combinator China
- Type: Private
- Industry: Venture Capital
- Founded: 2018; 8 years ago
- Founder: Lu Qi
- Headquarters: Beijing, China
- Website: miracleplus.com

MiraclePlus (Chinese: 奇绩创坛; pinyin: Qíjì Chuàngtán) is a startup accelerator and Chinese venture capital firm based in Beijing. It began in 2018 as YC China, the Chinese branch of the American accelerator Y Combinator, and became independent in November 2019 after Y Combinator closed the branch. Its founder and chief executive is Lu Qi, a former executive vice president of Microsoft and chief operating officer of Baidu.

The firm runs a three-month accelerator program twice a year and takes equity in the startups it admits.

== History ==
In 2018, Y Combinator (YC) president Sam Altman recruited Lu Qi to build YC China, a version of the accelerator's program run locally in China. Lu had been an executive vice president at Microsoft and chief operating officer at Baidu. YC China's first cohort of 22 startups was chosen from more than 1,700 applicants.

On 21 November 2019, Y Combinator announced that it would close YC China. It said a change in its leadership had led it to return to backing startups through its Silicon Valley program, which would continue to accept companies from China. It added that the timing was wrong for a country-specific version of the accelerator. The announcement coincided with mounting US–China friction over trade and technology, and Y Combinator described the decision as a strategic choice unconnected to that friction.

Lu later said Y Combinator's leadership first proposed withdrawing from China in May 2019, the month Geoff Ralston became the accelerator's president. Lu and the YC China team continued the program as MiraclePlus, a separate firm with its own funding, staff, and operations. Lu said that global conditions at the time called for a fully local organization. He also said that Y Combinator's US program required startups to go through incubation in the United States, which he called impractical for most Chinese startups.

The Spring 2020 cohort, the first under the MiraclePlus name, drew drew 20 percent more applicants than the fall 2019 cohort, according to Lu. Lu asked startups to address the question "Why now?" in their pitches. Thirty startups presented at the firm's first demo day under the MiraclePlus name in November 2020; most worked in technology-driven fields such as chips, sensors, life sciences, energy, and satellites.

The Wire China reported in February 2026 that MiraclePlus had kept Y Combinator's practice of investing the same amount in every startup it admits, giving each US$300,000 for 7 percent of its equity.

MiraclePlus' first fund had received $55 million in funding at the end of October 2019 according to the U.S. Securities and Exchange Commission. After MiraclePlus became independent it continued to acquire funding with its investors including Sequoia Capital, University of Michigan and Liu Qiangdong.

MiraclePlus has invested in companies including the AI inference platform SiliconFlow and the robotics maker AgiBot.

On 19 October 2026, the US State Department imposed sanctions on MiraclePlus and three related entities under the Protecting American Intellectual Property Act. The same action targeted Shanghai Zhisuan Technology, which Linwei Ding, a former Google software engineer, founded in 2023. A federal jury had convicted Ding in January 2026 of stealing Google trade secrets related to artificial intelligence. According to the State Department, Ding applied to MiraclePlus's incubation program on Zhisuan's behalf and promoted his familiarity with Google's technology. The department said MiraclePlus had taken an equity stake in Zhisuan as a seed investor. MiraclePlus said in a statement that it had not invested in Zhisuan and that it would seek to have the sanctions lifted.
