= The3six5 =

The3six5 was a global collaborative storytelling project involving 365 people – one for each day of the year – writing about something that was happening in the world that day and how it related to them.

It was created by Len Kendall and Daniel Honigman, and began on January 1, 2010. The idea was to create a crowdsourced journal of the year from the perspective of 365 individuals from around the world. The project ran for three years.

== Format and history ==
Volunteers from all corners of the world chose a date based on availability. Every day of the year, a different person would write a 365-word entry about his or her experience and thoughts from that day. Volunteers came from all walks of life and included news anchor Ann Curry, advertising legend Alex Bogusky, The Onion’s web editor Baratunde Thurston, interestingness curator Maria Popova, online performance artist, composer and humorist Ze Frank. and Chicago-based celebrity chef Rick Gresh Many of the posts exist at the intersection of history and biography as they share how world events relate to individuals. The project ran for over three years and produced over 1000 unique contributions. The collection of content originally existed on a now-defunct blogging platform called Posterous. The archive of the project now lives on Squarespace.

Volunteers can participate in the project only once.

In 2011, 12 editors were selected to manage the project on a daily basis for a month. The 12 editors were Daniel Timothy Edmundson, Jessica Mahajan, Dan Weingrod, Amanda Miller, Tim Dreyer, Mary Myers, Jenn Zuko Boughn, Bill Green, Stephanie Florence, Jose Callejas, Andreana Drencheva and Helene Kwong. The editors for 2012 are Andreana Drencheva, Jessica Mahajan, Karen Hong, Peter Combs, Christianne Weaver, Amanda Kasper, Jose Callejas, Tim Dreyer, John Pajarillaga and Marcus Gilmer.

Volunteers in Chicago launched a local edition of the3six5 in 2011. Local editions of Denver and Sinclair followed in 2012. The local editions create snapshots of the year from the perspective of 365 individuals from their local communities.

== Awards ==
In 2011, the3six5 was nominated for a Webby Award in the category of personal blog/website.
