= Caroline Hyde =

British journalist

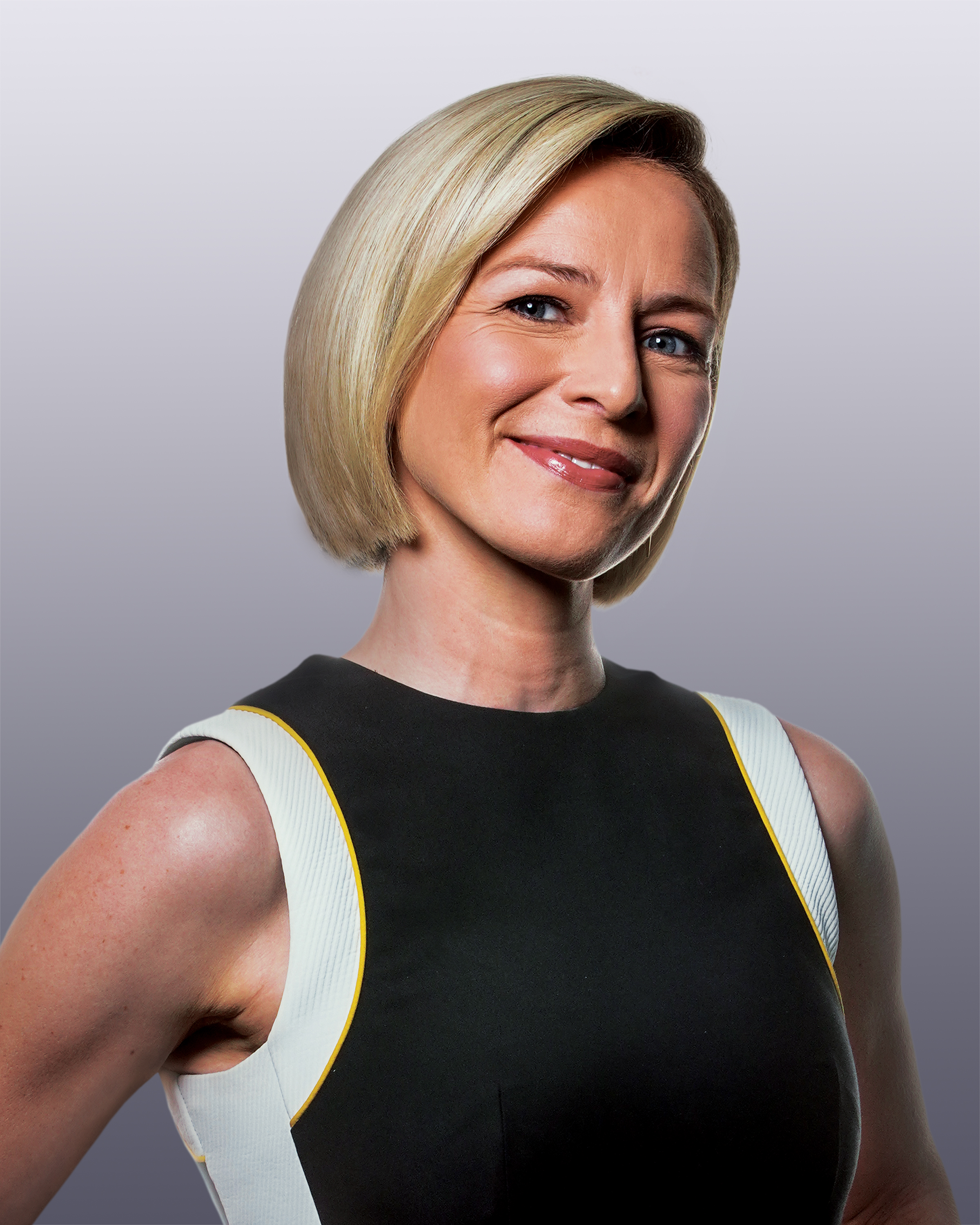
- Hyde in 2022
- Born: 24 May 1984 (age 42); London, England
- Education: Oxford University
- Occupation: Broadcast journalist
- Employer: Bloomberg L.P.
- Television: Bloomberg Markets: The Close
- Spouse: Ben Floyd (m. 2016)
- Children: 2

Caroline Hyde is a British journalist specialising in business and technology news. She currently co-anchors Bloomberg Technology, Bloomberg's flagship daily technology show from New York. She has also served as co-anchor of Bloomberg Markets: The Close and the network’s chief European correspondent, covering European business and technology since 2011.

== Early life ==
Hyde studied at Oxford University and has a masters in Politics, Philosophy and Economics. Upon graduation Hyde worked in public relations for London's Moorgate Group, where she was a debt market specialist, managing campaigns for clients including Standard & Poor's and Lloyds Banking Group.

== Bloomberg ==
Hyde joined Bloomberg in 2008 to cover the European debt markets for Bloomberg News as a corporate finance reporter, focusing on company loans and bonds as well as sovereign debt. She covered the freeze in the European loan market following the collapse of Lehman Brothers and the unravelling of the European sovereign debt crisis, as well as breaking news on the sales and performance of government bonds from Greece ahead of its bailout.

Moving to TV in 2011, she has interviewed economic leaders and political figures such as Ford Chairman Bill Ford, Unilever CEO Paul Polman, WPP CEO Sir Martin Sorrell, EasyJet CEO Carolyn McCall, Secretary General of the OECD José Ángel Gurría.

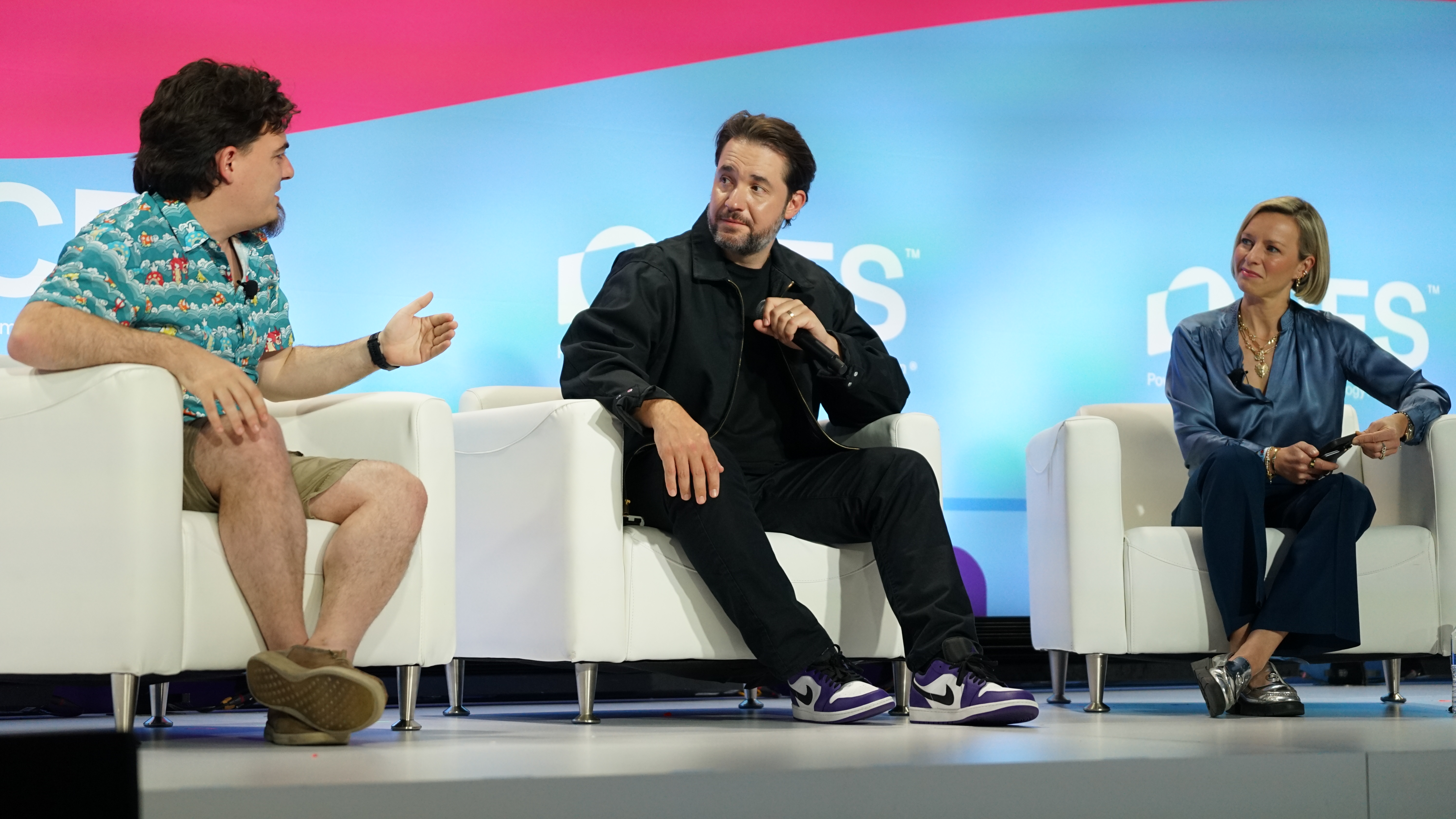
Luckey, Ohanian, Hyde at CES 2026 in Las Vegas

In May 2016, she anchored On the Move with Guy Johnson from Berlin and has interviewed many important world figures including Volkswagen CEO Matthias Müller, German presidential candidate Martin Schulz and Angela Merkel's Chief of Staff Peter Altmaier and Argentinian President Mauricio Macri.

From December 2016 until May 2017, she anchored Bloomberg Technology in San Francisco while regular host Emily Chang was on maternity leave. She continues as the European Technology and Media presenter on Bloomberg Television. Hyde has interviewed technology leaders including Microsoft CEO Satya Nadella, IBM CEO Ginni Rometty, Airbnb Founder Nathan Blecharczyk, Salesforce CEO Marc Benioff, Dropbox CEO Drew Houston, inventor of the World Wide Web Tim Berners-Lee and WhatsApp CEO Jan Koum.

== Awards ==
Shortlisted for Woman of the Future award in media in 2016.

== External interests ==
Hyde is a supporter of Broadminded, a women's professional network that organises inspiring talks, practical advice and an environment where women can encourage and learn from each other.

== Personal life ==
Hyde married Ben Floyd in May 2016. Their first child, a daughter, was born in 2019.
