= Breadpig =

Publisher/charity founded by Alexis Ohanian

breadpig
- Owners: Breadpig, Inc.
- Creator: Alexis Ohanian
- Website: breadpig.com
- Commercial: Yes
- Registration: None
- Launched: 2007
- Current status: Inactive

Breadpig, stylized as breadpig, is a company that produces a variety of items that appeal to geeks, most notably publishing the book xkcd: volume 0.

== Details ==
Breadpig was founded by Alexis Ohanian, a co-founder of the social news site Reddit. Ohanian and Steve Huffman, one of Reddit's other co-founders, were searching for expired domains for their yet unnamed website that had the word "read" in them. A search returned "breadpig.com" and the pair bought it purely out of comic value. Huffman imagined the "breadpig" as a "pig with bread wings", and Ohanian doodled the first version.

Breadpig teamed up with Randall Munroe, the author of xkcd, to publish xkcd: volume 0, which contains selected xkcd comics.

Breadpig calls itself an "uncorporation," which means "in practice" it gives a lot of its profits away to charity. "Rather than following the typical corporate directive of maximizing shareholder wealth, breadpig aims to do interesting (good) things with its profits."

In 2008, breadpig raised over $30,000 from creating and selling LOLmagnetz – magnetic poetry for lolspeak. In February 2009, breadpig donated $15,000 to the San Francisco Society for the Prevention of Cruelty to Animals and in October 2009, raised $32,000 for Room to Read to construct a primary school in Laos. breadpig went on to raise $52,700, via the sale of xkcd: volume 0. This money was used for the development of a school room, a reading room, and a local language publishing room, also via Room to Read. As of December 2010, breadpig has raised over $150,000 for charity (including both funds raised, and profits donated).
