= Libertad Municipality, Táchira =

Municipality in Táchira, Venezuela

Libertad Municipality Municipio Librtad
- Municipality

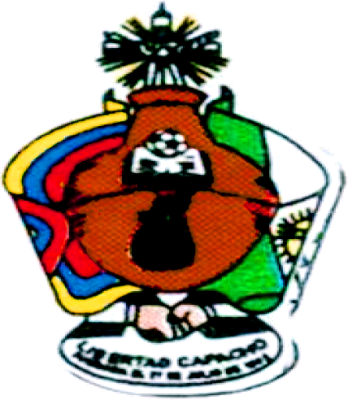
- Flag Seal

- Location in Táchira

- Location in Venezuela
- Coordinates: 7°47′33″N 72°19′49″W
- Country: Venezuela
- State: Táchira
- Founded: 1831
- Municipal seat: Capacho Viejo

Government
  - Mayor: Cliber Becerra Castro (Copei)

Area
  - Total: 157.8 km^{2} (60.9 sq mi)

Population (2023)
  - Total: 31,275
  - Density: 198.2/km^{2} (513.3/sq mi)
- Time zone: UTC−4 (VET)
- Area code(s): 0277

The Libertad Municipality is one of the 29 municipalities that makes up the western Venezuelan state of Táchira and, according to the 2023 Venezuelan census, the municipality had a population of 31,275. The mayor of the municipality is Cliber Becerra Castro of the Copei party since June 2025 and the town of Capacho Viejo is the municipal seat of the Libertad Municipality.
