= Geoff Ralston =

American businessman

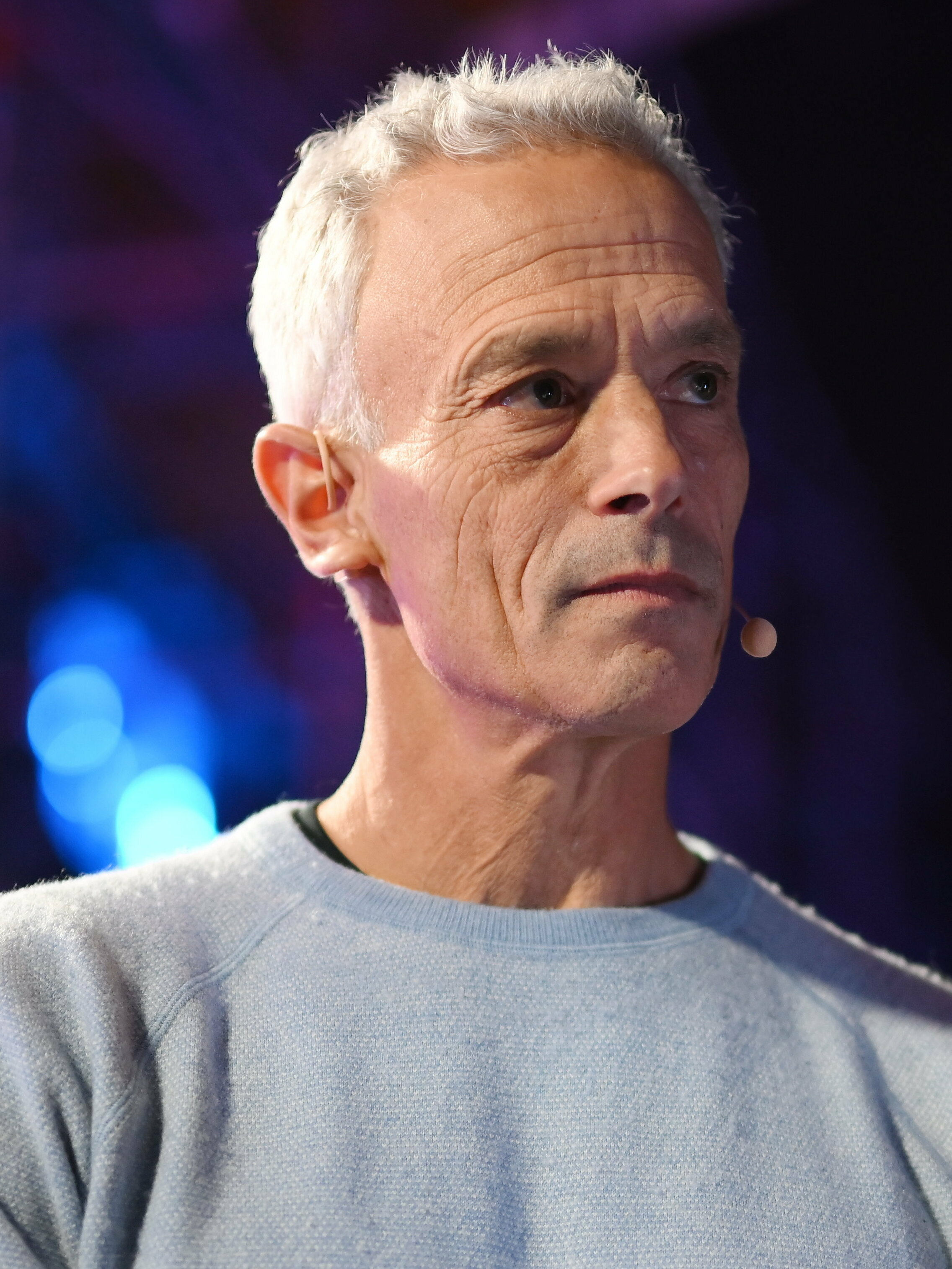
- Ralston in 2022
- Education: Dartmouth College; Stanford University; INSEAD

Geoff Ralston is the former President of Y Combinator. He was the CEO of La La Media, Inc., developer of Lala, a web browser-based music distribution site. Prior to Lala, Ralston worked for Yahoo!, where he was Vice President of Engineering and Chief Product Officer. In 1997, Ralston created Yahoo! Mail. In 2011 he co-founded Imagine K12, an education technology incubator with Alan Louie and Tim Brady. He joined Y Combinator in January 2012 and transitioned at the end of 2022.

In 2025, Ralston launched the Safe Artificial Intelligence Fund (SAIF). In a June 2026 interview, he identified biosecurity as the principal focus of his work on AI safety at that time.
