= Alexis Ohanian =

American entrepreneur (born 1983)

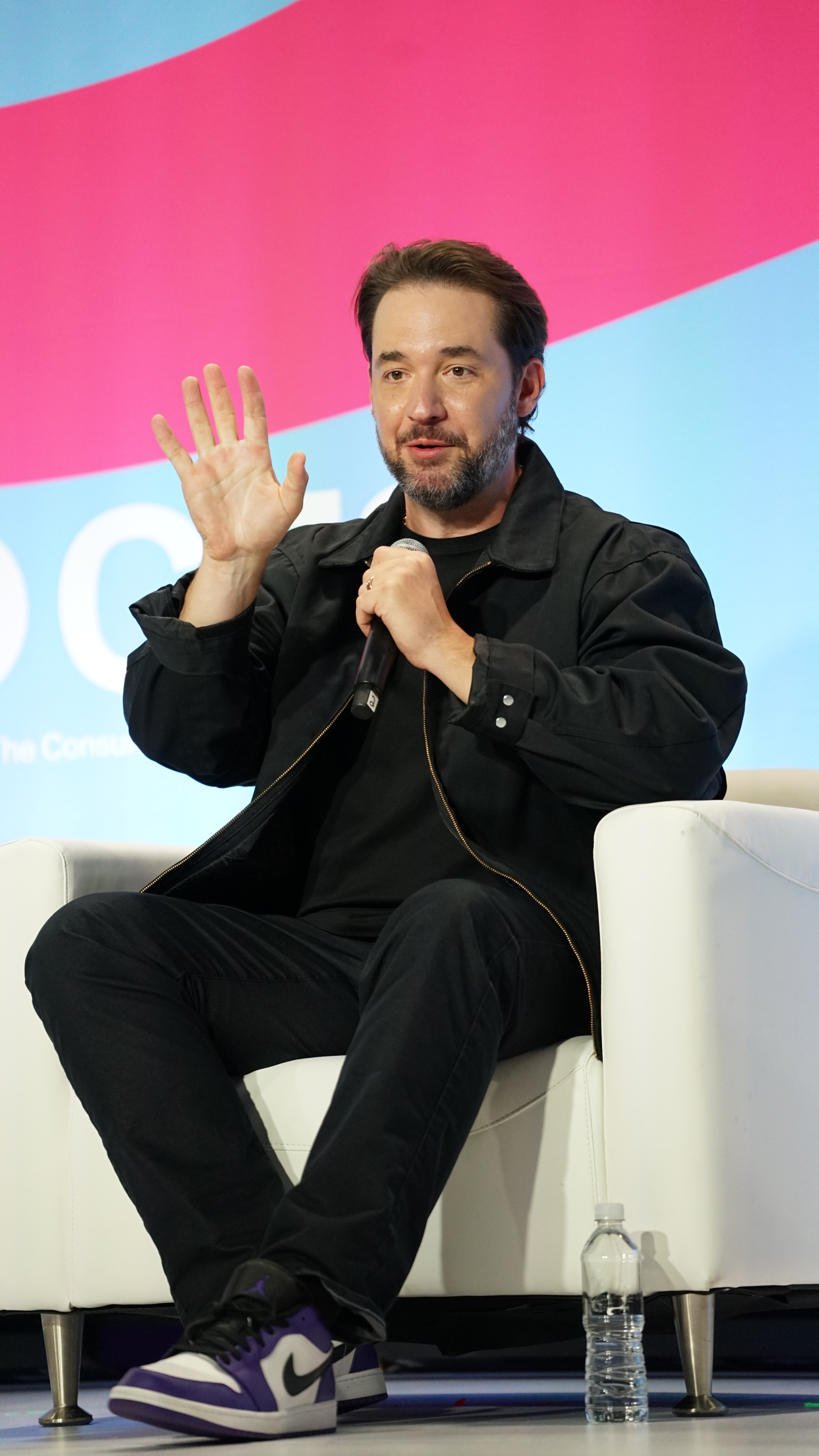
- Ohanian in 2026
- Born: Alexis Kerry Ohanian; April 24, 1983 (age 43); New York City, U.S.
- Education: University of Virginia (BA, BS)
- Occupations: Entrepreneur; venture capitalist; investor
- Notable work: Reddit; Initialized Capital; 776
- Spouse: Serena Williams (m. 2017)
- Children: 2
- Relatives: Richard Williams (father-in-law); Oracene Price (mother-in-law); Venus Williams (sister-in-law)
- Website: alexisohanian.com

Alexis Kerry Ohanian (born April 24, 1983) is an Armenian-American internet entrepreneur and investor. He is best known as the co-founder and former executive chairman of the social media site Reddit along with Steve Huffman and Aaron Swartz. He also co-founded the early-stage venture capital firm Initialized Capital, helped launch the travel search website Hipmunk and started the social enterprise Breadpig. He was also a partner at the startup accelerator and venture capital firm Y Combinator.

Ohanian is based in Florida where he lives with his wife, tennis player Serena Williams and their daughters, Alexis Olympia Ohanian and Adira River Ohanian.

As of 2024, Ohanian's net worth is estimated at $150 million.

== Early life and education ==
Ohanian's paternal grandparents fled from Bitlis and Kharput during the Armenian genocide and eventually moved to the United States as refugees, settling in Binghamton, New York.

Ohanian's father Chris, a travel agent, was born in San Francisco while his mother Anke, a pharmacy technician, was originally from Hamburg, Germany. Through his mother, Ohanian spoke German as a second language in his childhood, and while he identifies strongly with his Armenian heritage, Ohanian stated that he has little proficiency in Armenian. He is his parents' only child.

Ohanian was born in Brooklyn, New York City and the family moved to a Maryland suburb during his youth. Finding themselves the only Armenians in the neighborhood, his parents sent Alexis to an AGBU-sponsored summer camp to maintain ties to their culture. Ohanian attended Howard High School in Columbia, Maryland and delivered a commencement address in 2001 at Merriweather Post Pavilion.

With thoughts of becoming a computer programmer, Ohanian took the only computer science class offered in his high school. However, he lost confidence in the major once he arrived at the University of Virginia. He would go on to double major in history and business commerce and minor in German and has said, in retrospect, that he should have stayed with computer science given his work in technology.

== Career ==
=== Reddit (2005–2020) ===
Ohanian says his obsession with technology started in middle school when he got a 33.6k dialup modem. With the support of his parents, he took computer programming classes at community college, and he spent time on message boards learning how to code and build websites. Ohanian's parents also bought him his first computer—a 486 SX—which he took apart and put back together. Eventually, he began to make websites for nonprofit organizations for free, by "trick[ing]" them, hiding behind his email to disguise the fact that he was a teen doing this from his parents' basement.

At one point, Ohanian planned to become an attorney but instead walked out of a LSAT and went to a local Waffle House in Charlottesville, Virginia. While seated there, he realized that he wanted to start a company instead. After graduating from the University of Virginia in 2005 with degrees in commerce and history, Ohanian and his friend and college roommate Steve Huffman pitched the MyMobileMenu, a food ordering application, to Y Combinator. The company passed but encouraged the duo to come up with another idea it could potentially fund. They later came up with reddit.com, an online bulletin board, with the goal of it becoming the "front page of the Internet".

Reddit joined Y-Combinator's first batch of start-ups in the summer of 2005 and was later acquired by Condé Nast in 2006 for an undisclosed amount between $10 million and $20 million. Ohanian continued to work closely with Reddit as a member of its board of directors. He returned to Reddit full-time with co-founder Huffman in July 2015 to lead the now-independent company. He stepped back from the company in February 2018 to focus on investing again. On June 5, 2020, Ohanian resigned from Reddit's board, asking to be replaced by a Black candidate in response to the murder of George Floyd. Days later, Michael Seibel, an African-American entrepreneur, was named a Reddit board member.

=== Other ventures (2007–present) ===
In 2007, Ohanian launched Breadpig, an "uncorporation" that produces geeky merchandise and gives the proceeds to charity. As of 2012, he was no longer involved in the day-to-day operations of the company.

After leaving Reddit in 2010, Ohanian spent three months working in microfinance as a Kiva fellow in Yerevan, Armenia. Ohanian helped launch the travel search website Hipmunk this same year and now acts as an adviser. In June 2010, Ohanian launched Das Kapital Capital, which focuses on start-up investing, advising, and consulting.

Ohanian was given the title "Ambassador to the East" by the early-stage venture firm Y Combinator. In this position, he meets with East Coast applicants, mentors New York YC founders, and is a general representative for the company. He also held the role of part-time partner and full-time partner at Y Combinator before leaving in 2016 to help launch the third Initialized Capital fund with Garry Tan.

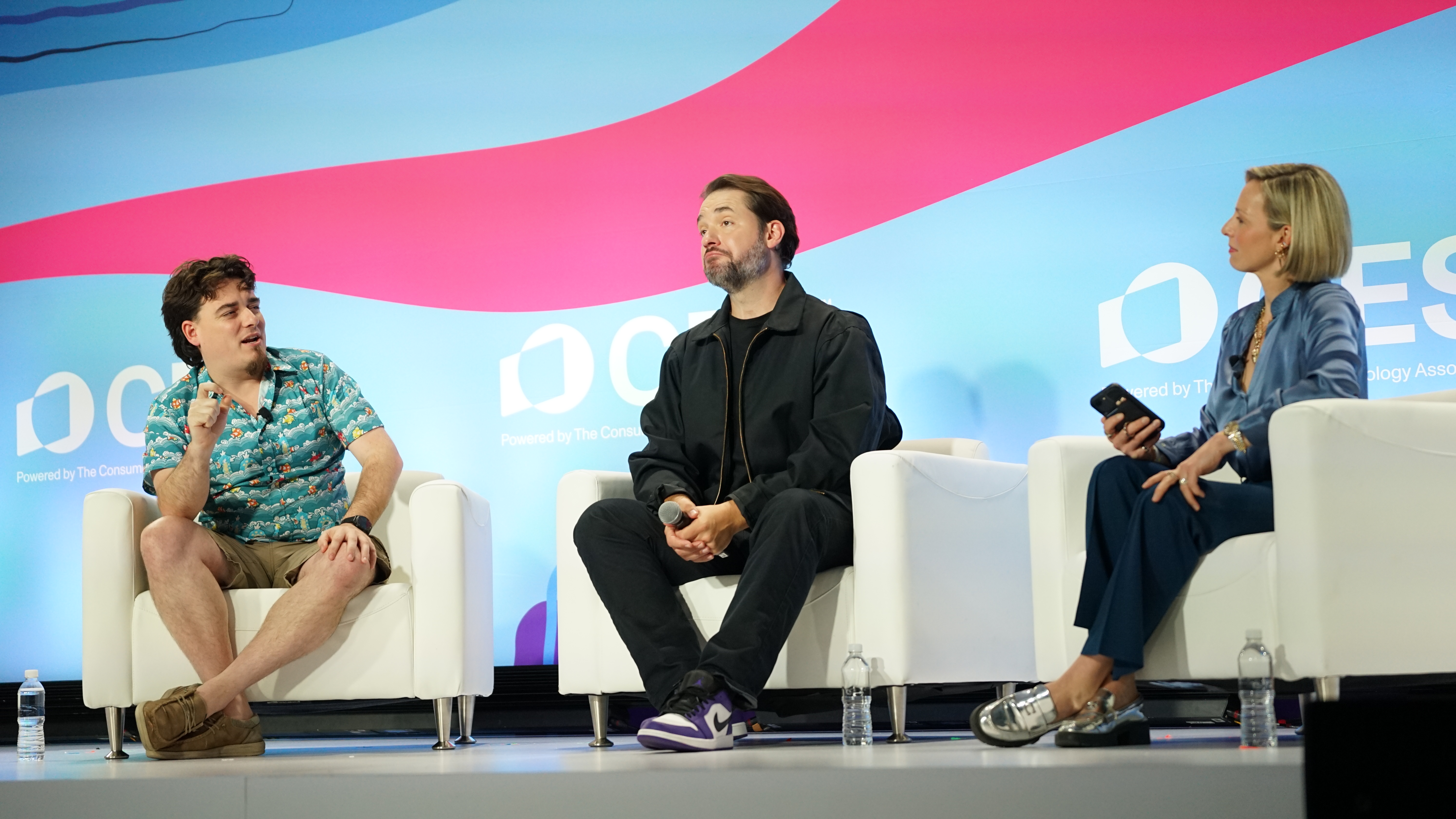
Palmer Luckey, Ohanian, Caroline Hyde at CES 2026

In July 2020, Ohanian became the founding control owner of a primarily female group that was awarded a new franchise in the National Women's Soccer League, the top level of the sport for women in the U.S. The new team, later unveiled as Angel City FC, started playing in 2022. The ownership group, in which women hold a majority interest, includes 14 former members of the U.S. women's national team, Oscar-winning actor Natalie Portman, and many other prominent actors, entertainers, media personalities, and sportspeople, among them Ohanian's wife, Serena Williams.

In June 2020, Ohanian ended his role as Managing Partner at Initialized, and in June 2021, Ohanian announced a new venture capital firm he is leading named "776". In 2024, he launched Athlos, a women's-only track and field event.

In March 2025, Ohanian co-purchased Digg with original founder Kevin Rose and re-launched it as a rebooted version of Digg's news aggregator with digging and burying features restored and the tagline: "The front page of the internet, now with superpowers." During its closed beta stage, it offered 21 generalized communities such as gaming, technology, and entertainment, and was open to 67,000 users on an invite-only basis. Its open beta launched to the public on January 14, 2026.

On May 14, 2025, Ohanian bought a 10 percent stake in Chelsea Women FC for £20 million and took a seat on their board of directors.

=== Early-stage tech investing ===
Ohanian co-founded Initialized Capital in 2010 and made seed investments in start-ups including Instacart, Zenefits, Opendoor, and Cruise. It has had three funds, totaling over $500 million under management. In 2014, CB Insights analyzed all the investors in tech, ranking Ohanian number one for network centrality, the breadth of connections an investor has with other investors in the ecosystem, and the quality and depth of those links. In July 2015, Ohanian invested $6 million into a consumer survey startup Survata in a Series A round along with other investors including IDG Ventures, Bloomberg Beta, Garry Tan and other angel investors.

Through Initialized Capital, Ohanian invested $3 million in childcare start-up Kinside in 2019. In 2020, Ohanian also invested $4 million in Dispo (David's Disposable).

In April 2021, Ohanian invested $10 million into social startup pearpop in a Series A round, alongside $6 million coming from other investors including Bessemer Venture Partners, Sound Ventures, Slow Ventures and other celebrities.

In June 2021, Ohanian led a $50 million investment into nutrition technology startup SIMULATE in a Series B round with NOMO Ventures, Imaginary Ventures, Day One Ventures, McCain Foods, and Crystal and Chris Sacca

In July 2025, Ohanian led a $6 million seed round through 776 Ventures into Ticket Wallet, with involvement by other VC firms like Palm Drive Capital, Symphony Ventures, Y Combinator, and strategic angel investors from the sports, tech, and entertainment sectors. Ticket Wallet is a startup which provides an AI-powered resale and automated listing platform for ticket brokers and season ticket holders, as well as services for regular customers, like buying and selling tickets.

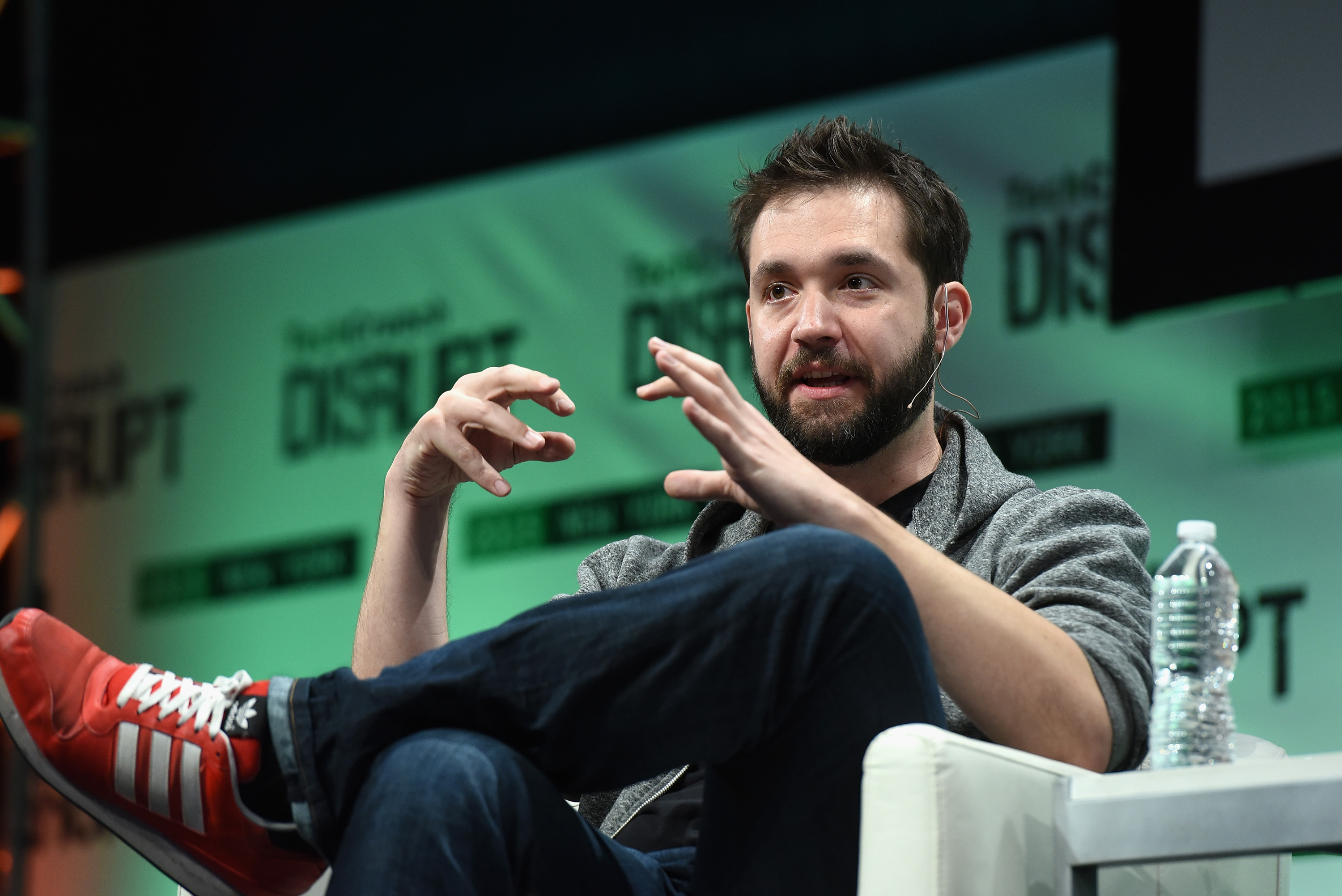
Ohanian in 2015

=== Victoria Taylor firing ===
On July 2, 2015, Reddit fired communications director Victoria Taylor, an administrator who coordinated celebrity interviews from Reddit's New York office. In protest, volunteer moderators of the IAmA community set their forum to private, effectively turning it off, and other volunteer moderators followed suit because of "anger at the way the company routinely demands that the volunteers and community accept major changes that reduce [their] efficiency and increase [their] workload". The following day, a moderator of IAmA posted that "Chooter (Victoria) was let go as an admin by u/kn0thing [Alexis Ohanian]", an assertion that was not widely reported on. Media outlets such as Variety blamed interim CEO Ellen Pao for the dismissal. Harassment, which was already being directed toward Pao in relation to other controversies, intensified and she resigned a week later. However, on July 12, former CEO Yishan Wong informed the Reddit community that Taylor was fired by "the CEO's boss" and accused Ohanian of scapegoating. In the aftermath of Pao's resignation, Ohanian elaborated on his role in Taylor's dismissal, countering that even though the AMA/IAmA changes came from him, he still reported to Pao. In 2017, Pao criticized Ohanian for avoiding the fallout by attending Wimbledon in the days immediately following Taylor's firing.

== Creative work ==
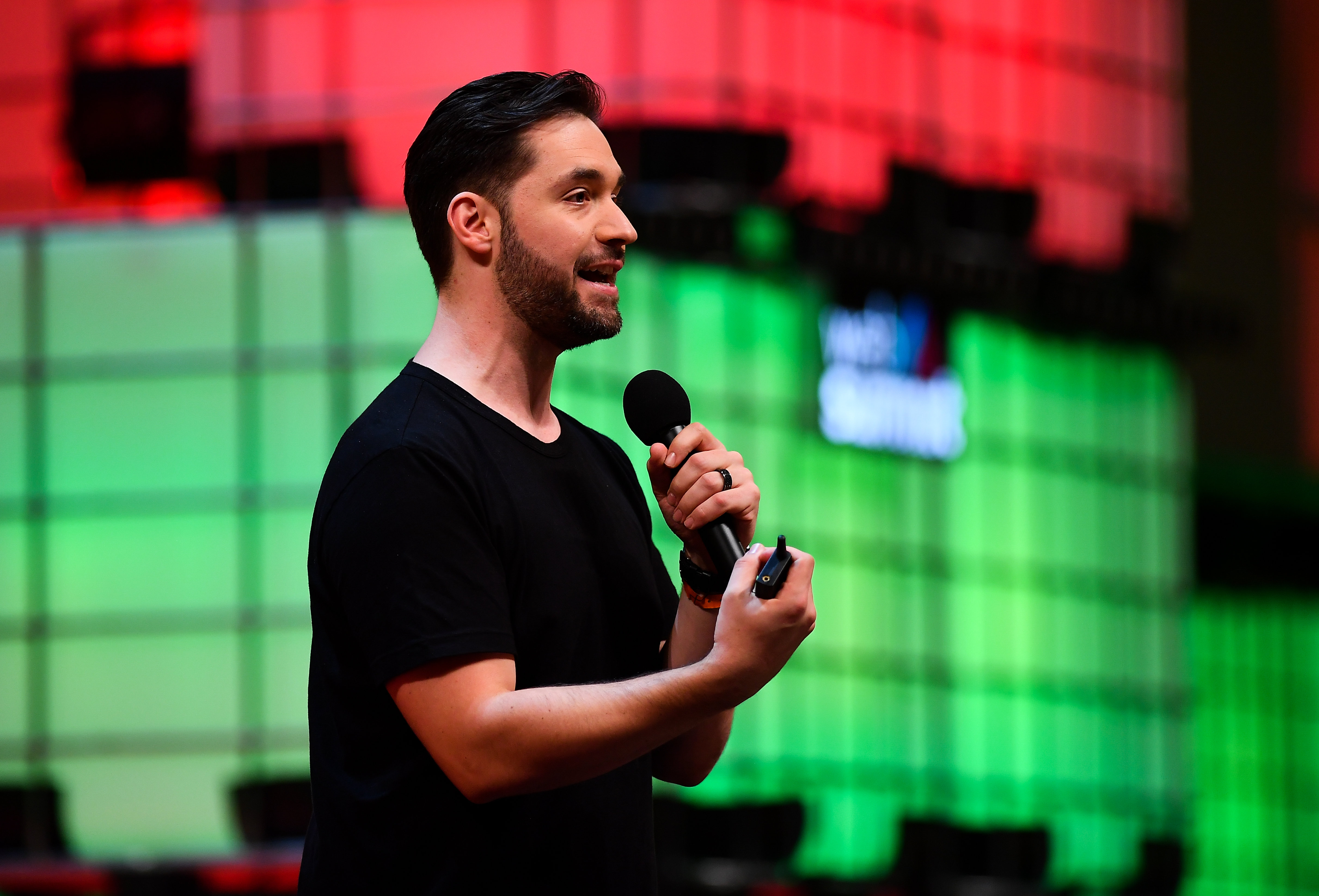
Ohanian in 2018

Ohanian has created all of the mascots for the companies he started: Reddit alien "Snoo", Breadpig pig with bread wings, Hipmunk chipmunk "Chip", and Initialized Capital honey badger.

In 2009, he spoke at TED about a whale named Mister Splashy Pants.

== Activism in Tech ==
=== Open Internet activism ===
In late 2010 and early 2011, Ohanian spoke out against Congress's Stop Online Piracy Act and the Senate's PROTECT IP Act. He helped lead the Internet-enabled campaign that eventually overturned the two bills. Ohanian spoke to members of Congress, helped launch the national anti-SOPA/PIPA protests that took place on January 18, 2012, and spoke at the rally in New York that was organized by NY Tech Meetup.

In October 2012, Ohanian teamed up with Reddit General Manager Erik Martin and embarked on the Internet 2012 Bus Tour from Denver, Colorado to Danville, Kentucky to campaign for the open Internet during the presidential and vice presidential debates. One of the campaigns stops spurred the idea for a possible "National Geek Day" in Washington, D.C. In response to his work advocating for an Open Internet, The Daily Dot named Ohanian number one in their top 10 most influential activists of 2012, and Forbes Magazine dubbed him "Mayor of the Internet".

In May 2014, Ohanian began lobbying the FCC to support net neutrality, culminating with a day-long phone-a-thon with the FCC and Congress on January 15, 2015.

=== Hijab emoji project ===
In early 2017, Ohanian worked with teenager Rayouf Alhumedhi to campaign for a hijab emoji. Ohanian helped arrange an AMA for Alhumedhi on r/twoxchromosomes about her idea and responded to critics. On July 17, 2017, Apple released its version of the hijab emoji.

=== Crowdfunding campaigns ===
On December 10, 2012, Ohanian teamed up with Lester Chambers of The Chambers Brothers to launch a Kickstarter project, with the intent to make a new album entitled "Lester's Time Has Come". According to Fast Company, Ohanian aimed "to prove that there are new, sustainable funding opportunities for artists now thanks to platforms like Kickstarter". This project raised over $61,000 for Chambers.

Two years later, Ohanian raised $12,244 for the non-profit Black Girls Code on Tilt.com. In May 2014, Ohanian used Tilt.com again to launch "Save Net Neutrality: Billboard in FCC's Backyard", a crowdfunding campaign to protest the FCC's plans to eliminate the idea of net neutrality.

Visiting Armenia on the occasion of the 100th anniversary of the Armenian genocide, in April 2015, Ohanian toured Children of Armenia Fund (COAF)-supported villages in rural Armenia.

== Personal life ==
In 2008, Ohanian's mother, Anke, died from brain cancer.

On December 29, 2016, Ohanian became engaged to Olympian tennis player Serena Williams. Their daughter, Alexis Olympia Ohanian, was born on September 1, 2017, in West Palm Beach, Florida. Ohanian and Williams married on November 16, 2017, in New Orleans. Guests at the wedding included Beyoncé, Anna Wintour, Kelly Rowland and Kim Kardashian. Ohanian has said that "watching Williams compete has changed how he measures success in business". Ohanian and Williams gave their daughter a doll, called Qai Qai, which has become famous on social media. In May 2023, it was revealed that Williams was pregnant with the couple's second child in an announcement before the Met Gala, where she was seen visibly pregnant. In August 2023, Williams gave birth to their second daughter, Adira River.

On November 28, 2024, he underwent surgery to remove thyroid nodules to prevent possible cancer.

=== Advocacy for paternity leave ===
Following the birth of his daughter, Ohanian became an advocate of paternity leave and wrote an article about his experience following his daughter's birth in the New York Times. "After my wife nearly died giving birth, I spent months at home caring for my family". In June 2019, Ohanian announced his plans to bring the pledge to lawmakers on Capitol Hill in late 2019 to push for passage of federal paid family leave legislation. He stated that "I hope to be meeting with many senators, representatives, plenty of dads on both sides of the aisle, in both houses of the Legislature, who want this to be the law of the land".

== Philanthropy ==
Since 2022, Ohanian has been funding climate-related projects started by young founders via the 776 Foundation Fellowship Program, modelled after the Thiel Fellowship. The fellowship is intended for students aged 23 or younger and offers them a total of $100,000 over two years, as well as guidance and other resources, to drop out of school and pursue work related to combating climate change, which could involve scientific research, creating a startup, or working on a social movement. Selection for the fellowship is through a competitive annual process, with 20 fellows selected annually.

== Awards and honors ==
To commemorate Ohanian's realization about his professional career, Derick Moore, a division manager at Waffle House, had a plaque installed at Booth 19 that includes a quote from Ohanian and reads: "Site of Alexis Ohanian's Waffle House Epiphany."

In 2011 and 2012, Ohanian was named to the Forbes "30 Under 30" list as an important figure in the technology industry. In 2013, Ohanian and Erik Martin were featured as "champions of innovation" in the 20th Anniversary issue of Wired. In 2015, Ohanian was named to the Crain's "40 Under 40" list for business. In 2016, Ohanian was named one of Fast Company's "Most Creative People in Business".

On May 21, 2020, Ohanian delivered the commencement address at Johns Hopkins University, the following year was a commencement speaker at his alma mater, the University of Virginia, and in December 2022, was named a 2023 Money Changemaker by Money magazine.

== Publications and in the media ==
=== Without Their Permission ===
Ohanian published a book titled Without Their Permission: How the 21st Century Will Be Made, Not Managed on October 1, 2013, which ranked fourth on The Wall Street Journal's best sellers list for Hardcover Business. Ohanian embarked on a five-month, 150-stop and 75-university tour to promote the book.

=== Small Empires ===
In the summer of 2013, Small Empires with Alexis Ohanian, a weekly online series focused on rising startups in New York City hosted by Ohanian, premiered on The Verge. The first season ran for nine episodes. The second season premiered in October 2014.

=== NYRD Radio podcast ===
On October 15, 2014, Ohanian launched the NYRD Radio podcast. Guests on the show have included Tim Ferriss, James Altucher, Carter Cleveland (founder of Artsy) and Cameron Russell. The podcast features a segment called Office Hours, in which aspiring entrepreneurs can apply to work through an idea with him.
