= GOAT Group =

Holding company

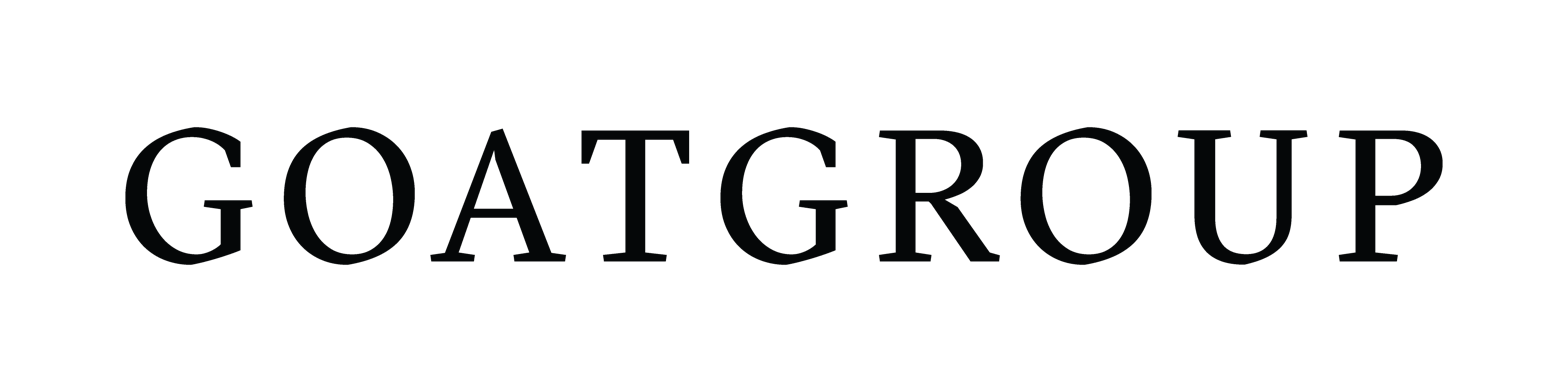
- Industry: Sneaker and apparel reseller
- Founded: 2018
- Founder: Eddy Lu; Daishin Sugano
- Key people: Eddy Lu (CEO)
- Website: www.goatgroup.com

GOAT Group is a holding company that operates e-commerce platforms for sneakers, apparel, and accessories. Formed in 2018, it operates the online platform GOAT, Flight Club, alias, and Grailed.

== History ==
GOAT Group's origins date back to 2015 with the founding of the online sneaker platform GOAT. In 2018, GOAT acquired retail sneaker consignment company Flight Club. GOAT and Flight Club continued to operate as two separate brands and led to the creation of GOAT Group. The acquisition was followed by a $100 million investment from Foot Locker in 2019.

In 2020, GOAT Group launched Alias (styled "alias"), an online platform that allows users to list their own sneakers and apparel for resale. By 2021, GOAT Group was valued at $3.7 billion dollars after it received an additional $195 million private investment in the company. In 2022, GOAT Group purchased Grailed, an online peer-to-peer marketplace for apparel, accessories, and footwear.

== Brands ==
=== GOAT ===
GOAT is an online platform for sneakers, apparel and accessories. Founded in 2015, it uses a ship-to-verify model and is one of the largest platforms for buying and selling new and vintage sneakers, apparel and accessories.

=== Flight Club ===
Flight Club is a sneaker consignment store. It operates out of three brick and mortar locations in New York, Los Angeles, and Miami as well as its website. Founded in 2005, it became part of GOAT Group when it was acquired by GOAT in 2018.

=== alias ===
alias is an online sneaker and apparel platform that allows users to list their own product for sale. It launched in 2020 as an extension of GOAT's "seller" platform.

=== Grailed ===
Grailed is an online marketplace for apparel and footwear. Founded in 2014, it offers high-end resale items from brands including Raf Simons, Gucci, Balenciaga, and others. Originally launched as a platform for men, it began offering women's footwear and apparel in 2022.
