= Land and liberty =

Land and liberty, Land and freedom, or Tierra y Libertad may refer to:

== Revolutionary campaigns and organizations ==
- Land and liberty (slogan), originally used by the revolutionary leaders of the Mexican Revolution
- Land and Liberty (Russia), a 19th-century Russian revolutionary secret society
- Land and Freedom Column, that fought in the Spanish Civil War
- Kenya Land and Freedom Army, or Mau Mau, a 1950s insurgent group
- Tierra y Libertad (Peru), political party in Peru

== Publications ==
- Land&Liberty, a quarterly magazine
- Land and Liberty (newspaper), a 1914–1915 newspaper published by William C. Owen
- Tierra y Libertad (newspaper), several periodicals in Spain and Mexico

== Other uses ==
- Land and Freedom (film), a 1995 film directed by Ken Loach
- Tierra y Libertad, a 2015 album by Xibalba
- XHTYL-FM, or Radio Tierra y Libertad, in Mexico
- Tierra y Libertad, Chiapas, a locality in Jiquipilas, in Mexico
