= Y Combinator =

American startup accelerator

Y Combinator Management, LLC
- Type: Private
- Industry: Venture capital
- Founded: March 2005; 21 years ago
- Founders: Paul Graham, Jessica Livingston, Robert Tappan Morris, Trevor Blackwell
- Headquarters: San Francisco, California, United States
- Key people: Garry Tan (President & CEO); Jared Friedman (Managing Partner); Harj Taggar (Managing Partner); Diana Hu (Managing Partner)
- Products: Startup accelerator
- Website: ycombinator.com

Y Combinator (YC) is an American technology startup accelerator and venture capital firm and the operator of Hacker News. Based in San Francisco, California, YC has invested in more than 5,000 companies since its founding in 2005. Companies that have participated in YC include Airbnb, Coinbase, Cruise, DoorDash, Dropbox, GOAT, Instacart, Reddit, Rippling, Scale AI, Stripe, and Twitch. OpenAI was founded as an initiative of YC’s nonprofit research arm. As of 2019, more than 400 YC companies were worth more than $100M, and 100 were unicorns.

== History ==
Founded in 2005 by Paul Graham, Jessica Livingston, Robert Tappan Morris, and Trevor Blackwell, Y Combinator initiated operations with concurrent programs in Cambridge, Massachusetts, and Mountain View, California. However, operational complexities arising from managing two programs prompted a consolidation in January 2009, resulting in the closing of the Cambridge program and the centralization of activities in Silicon Valley.

In 2009, Y Combinator secured a $2 million investment led by Sequoia Capital, enabling increased annual funding for around 60 companies. Sequoia further supported YC in 2010 through an $8.25 million funding round, bolstering the organization's capability to accommodate a growing number of startups. Concurrently, Kirsty Nathoo joined the team, initially as an accountant, and subsequently as the Chief Financial Officer (CFO) in 2012. In 2011, Yuri Milner and SV Angel offered every Y Combinator company a $150,000 convertible note investment. The amount put into each company was changed to $80,000 when Start Fund was renewed.

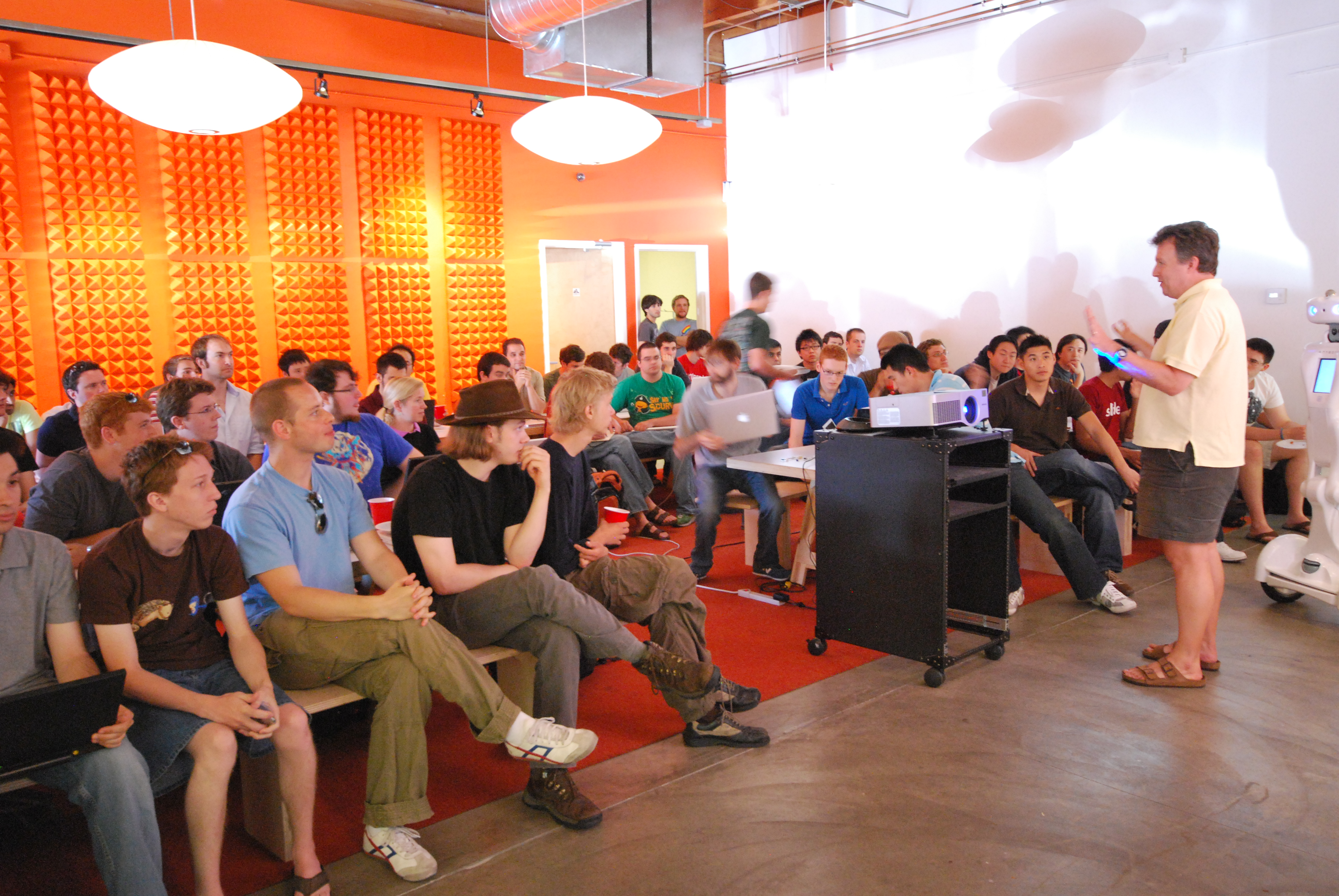
Paul Graham talking about Prototype Day at Y Combinator Summer 2009

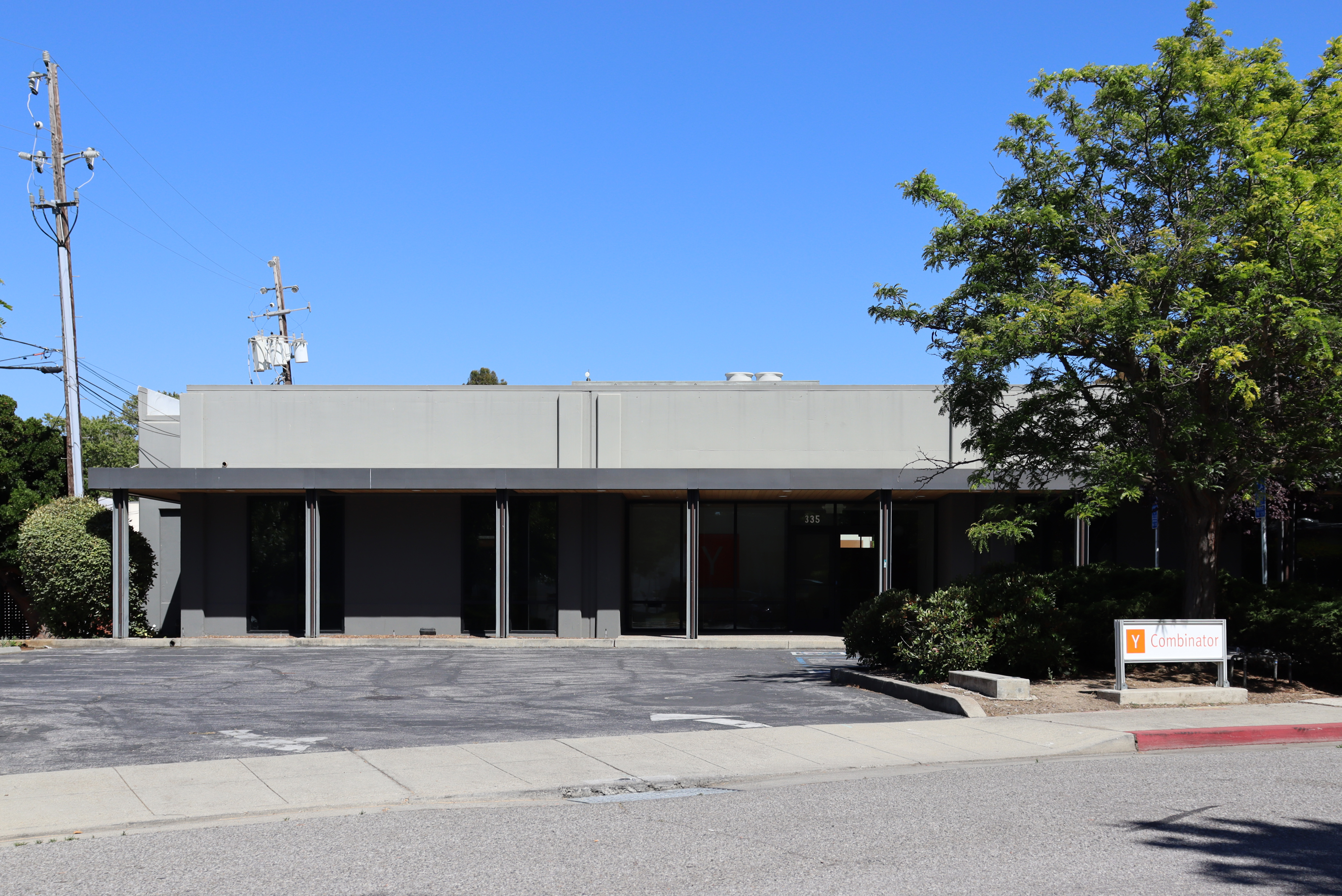
Former headquarters in Mountain View

Advisory roles were assumed by Harj Taggar and Alexis Ohanian in 2010, and Paul Buchheit and Taggar were named partners in November. Michael Seibel joined Y Combinator as a part-time partner in January 2013 before becoming a full-time partner in 2014. In September 2013, Y Combinator began funding nonprofit organizations that were accepted into the program after testing the concept with Watsi.

Sam Altman took part in Y Combinator's inaugural cohort in 2005 as a founder. In 2014, Paul Graham appointed him as president. Altman introduced a revised equity offering of $150,000 for a 7% stake. Under Altman, Peter Thiel joined as a visiting partner from 2015 to 2017.

The Simple Agreement for Future Equity (SAFE) was introduced by Y Combinator in 2013 as an instrument for seed financing and an alternative to the convertible note. Since its creation, the SAFE has become YC’s standard document for its own seed investments as well as the standard template for seed financings across the industry.

Global outreach became evident in 2016 as YC partners embarked on visits to 11 countries (India, Israel, Nigeria, Denmark, Portugal, Sweden, Germany, Russia, Argentina, Chile and Mexico) to engage with founders and learn about international startup communities. That summer, Altman returned to the United States and worked on OpenAI. Leadership responsibilities were delegated to Ali Rowghani and Michael Seibel for YC Continuity and YC Core programs, respectively. Startup School, introduced in 2017, provided startups with online courses and personalized coaching. More than 1500 startups graduated from the program in its first year.

In 2018, Y Combinator announced a new batch of startup schools. After a software glitch, all 15,000 startups that applied to the program were accepted, only to learn a few hours later that they had been rejected. In response to the ensuing outcry, Y Combinator accepted all 15,000 companies involved in the incident. The same year, Qi Lu, a former CEO of Bing and Baidu, briefly assumed the role of CEO for YC China. In November, YC announced Lu's departure and their decision to not pursue a program in China. YC China later morphed into MiraclePlus, an accelerator similar to YC, with Lu once again at the helm.

Geoff Ralston succeeded Altman as Y Combinator's president in 2019.

Adapting to the COVID-19 pandemic, Y Combinator conducted its summer 2020 batch remotely. In January 2022, a revised standard deal of $500,000 was introduced, comprising $125,000 for a 7% equity stake and an additional $375,000 via an uncapped safe mechanism incorporating a Most Favored Nation (MFN) clause. The summer of 2022 saw a deliberate reduction in the startup intake by 40%, from 414 companies to 250.

Reflecting on Y Combinator's expansion in 2026, former president Geoff Ralston said that concerns among partners about their ability to give each startup sufficient attention had contributed to a subsequent reduction in intake.

In January 2023, Garry Tan assumed the positions of president and CEO, succeeding Geoff Ralston. Tan's leadership marked the discontinuation of the YC Continuity growth fund.

YC moved its headquarters from Mountain View to San Francisco in the spring of 2023. It had been considering such a move since 2019.

In March 2024, Seibel stepped down as managing director, being succeeded by Jared Friedman.

On March 30th, 2026, Y Combinator announced its fastest unicorn company to date with Starcloud raising a $170 million Series A at a $1.1 billion valuation led by Benchmark and EQT Ventures 17 months after demo day.

== Programs ==
Y Combinator interviews and selects four batches of companies per year. The companies receive a total of $500,000 in seed money as well as advice and connections. The $500,000 in funding is made up of $125,000 on a post-money SAFE in return for 7% equity and $375,000 on an uncapped SAFE with a "most favored nation" ("MFN") provision (i.e.: "we get the same best terms you give anyone else in the next round"). Non-profits receive a $100,000 donation. The program includes "office hours", where startup founders meet individually and participate in group meetings. Founders also participate in weekly meetups where guests from the Silicon Valley ecosystem (successful entrepreneurs, venture capitalists, etc.) speak to the founders.

Y Combinator's program is designed to teach founders how to market their product, refine their teams and business models, achieve product/market fit, and scale the startup into a high growth business, etc. The program ends with "Demo Day", where startups present their business and technology prototypes to potential investors.

Y Combinator operates additional programs and a fund designed to support and invest in startups that have already graduated from the main accelerator program. The Series A Program, YC Post-A Program, and YC Growth Program are operated by the same team and focus on helping fast-growing YC startups, and startups raising their Series B funding of $20 million to $100 million.

Y Combinator has introduced additional programs since 2015, including:

- In July 2015, Y Combinator introduced the YC Fellowship Program, aimed at companies at an earlier stage than the main program. The first batch of YC Fellowship included 32 companies that received an equity-free grant instead of an investment. In January 2016, YC changed the program, with participating companies receiving $20,000 investment for a 1.5 percent equity stake. The equity stake is structured as a convertible security that converts into shares only if a company has an initial public offering (IPO), or a funding event or acquisition that values the company at $100 million or more. The fellowship was discontinued in 2017.
- In October 2015, Y Combinator introduced the now-defunct YC Continuity Fund. The fund allowed Y Combinator to make pro rata investments in their alumni companies. The program was shut down, and staff were laid off in March 2023.
- During 2017–2019, YC launched Startup School, the Series A program, the YC Growth program, Work at a Startup, and YC China.
- In June 2025, YC held the first AI Startup School in San Francisco, gathering 2,500 of the top CS undergrads, masters, and PhD candidates in AI. Speakers included Elon Musk, Sam Altman, Satya Nadella, Andrej Karpathy, Andrew Ng, and Fei-Fei Li amongst others.

As of 2026, Y Combinator had invested in over 5,668 companies, most of which are for-profit, holding a combined valuation of $600 billion. Non-profit organizations can also participate in the main YC program. Few non-profits have been accepted in the last years, among them Watsi, Women Who Code, New Story, SIRUM, Zidisha, 80,000 Hours, and Our World in Data.

== Research ==
In October 2015, YC introduced YC Research to fund long-term fundamental research. Altman donated $10 million. Researchers were paid as full-time employees and can receive equity in Y Combinator.

OpenAI was the first project undertaken by YC Research, and in January 2016, a second study on basic income was also announced. Another project was research on new cities.

The Human Advancement Research Community (HARC) project was set up in 2016 with the "mission to ensure human wisdom exceeds human power". The project was inspired by a conversation between Altman and Alan Kay. Its projects included modelling, visualizing and teaching software, as well as programming languages. Members included Alan Kay, Dan Ingalls, Bret Victor, Vi Hart, and Patrick Scaglia. HARC was shut down in 2017.

Australian quantum physicist Michael Nielsen was a research fellow at YC Research from 2016 to 2019.

YC Research disaffiliated with Y Combinator and was renamed to Open Research in 2020.

== See also ==
- List of Y Combinator startups
- Techstars
- 500 Startups
- HighTechXL
- Entrepreneurs Roundtable Accelerator
