= Libertad (name) =

Libertad is a Spanish surname and a given name meaning 'freedom'. Notable people with the name include:

== Surname ==
- Albert Libertad (1875–1908), pseudonym of Albert Joseph, anarchist writer and activist
- Tania Libertad (born 1952), Afro-Peruvian singer

== Given name ==
- Libertad Lamarque (1908–2000), Argentine actress and singer
- Libertad Leblanc (1938–2021), Argentine film actress
