= GOAT (platform) =

American online clothing platform

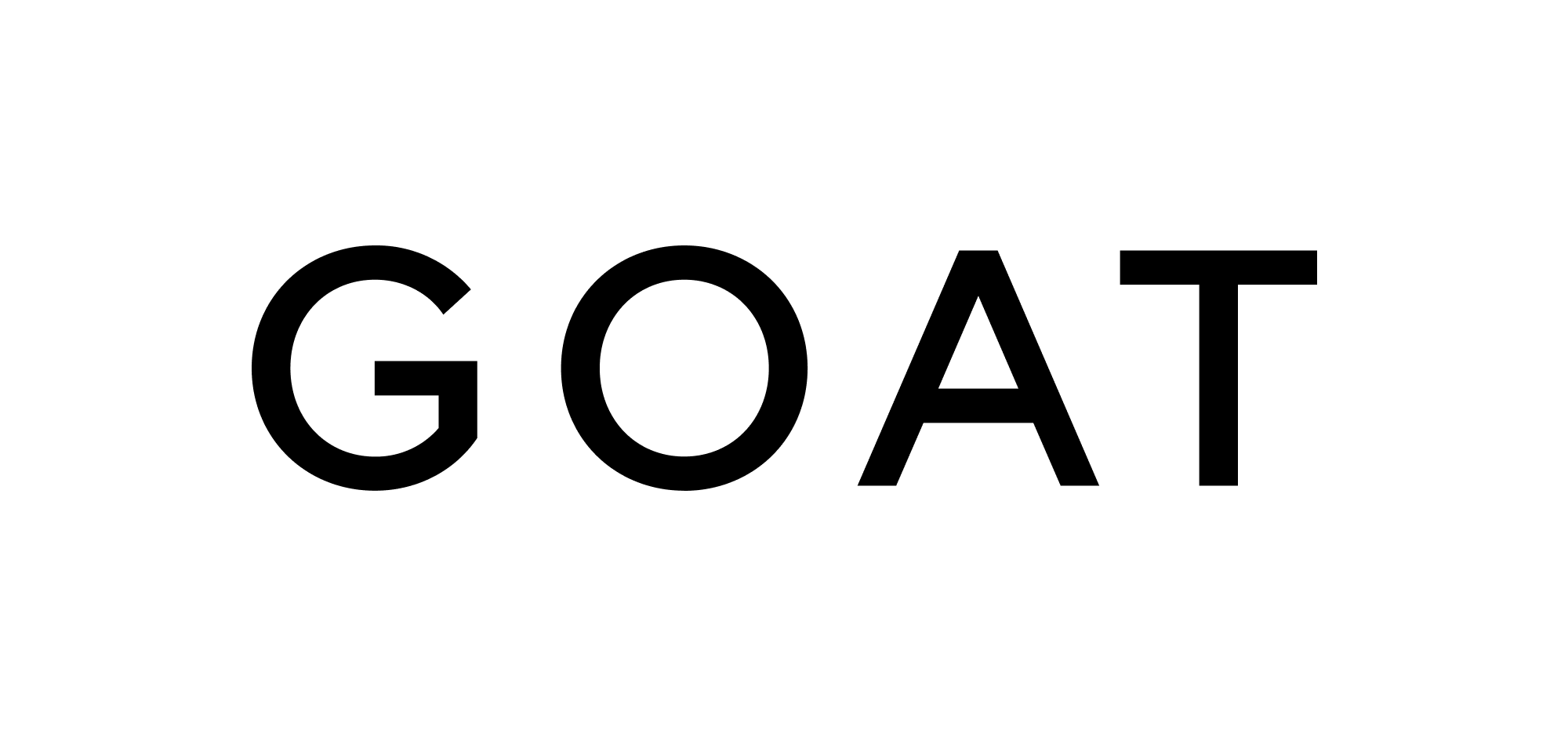
- Industry: Sneaker and apparel reseller
- Founded: 2015
- Founders: Eddy Lu; Daishin Sugano
- Key people: Eddy Lu (CEO); Daishin Sugano (CPO); Yunah Lee (COO)
- Parent: GOAT Group
- Website: www.goat.com

GOAT is an American online platform offering sneakers, streetwear, luxury apparel and accessories through the primary and resale markets. Founded in 2015, GOAT has 50 million members and over 1,000,000 sellers across 170 countries on its platform.

== History ==
GOAT was founded by Eddy Lu and Daishin Sugano in July 2015. The idea for the platform was inspired by a purchase of sneakers by Sugano which turned out to be fake. Lu and Sugano launched GOAT as an online sneaker platform that would authenticate purchases to ensure no counterfeit shoes were sold.

In February 2018, GOAT announced the acquisition of Flight Club, creating an omni-channel approach for the business. The brands operate independently, as GOAT focuses on mobile and web listings, while Flight Club focuses on global retail and e-commerce consignment. In July 2019, GOAT launched in China.

In April 2022, GOAT partnered with French football club Paris-Saint Germain as the official style partner, with the platform's logo appearing on the club's jersey sleeve starting from the 2022-23 season. Collections and campaigns featuring the Parisian club and players such as Kylian Mbappé later emerged from the partnership.

== Platform ==
GOAT implements a ship-to-verify model that uses machine learning and human review to verify the authenticity of the sneakers on its platform. In 2019, the platform expanded into new markets and categories to offer luxury and streetwear apparel and accessories.

GOAT has partnered with several luxury brands, including Versace and Bergdorf Goodman, to list their products directly on the platform. By 2022, GOAT had 50 million members and 1,000,000 sellers across 170 countries on its platform.
