= New Story (charity) =

Market-based housing nonprofit

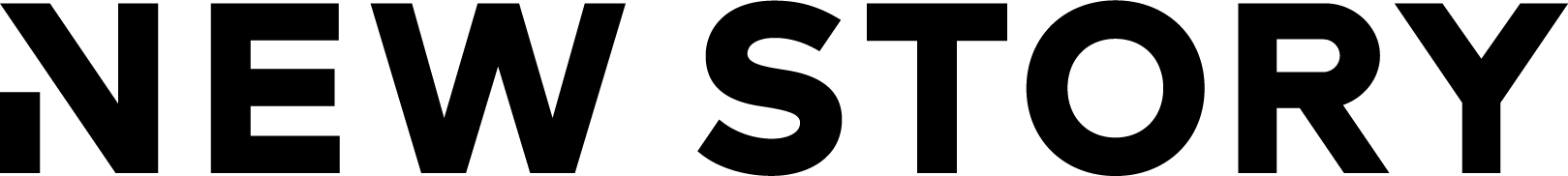
- Founded: 2014
- Founders: Brett Hagler, Alexandria Lafci, Matthew Marshall, Mike Arrieta
- Founded at: San Francisco, California, U.S.
- Type: Non-governmental organization
- Region served: 4 countries in Latin America and the Caribbean
- Employees: 15
- Website: newstoryhomes.org

New Story is a non-profit organization that provides homes to people living with inadequate shelter. The organization was founded in 2014 and has provided homes for more than 15,200 people in Haiti, Bolivia, Mexico, and El Salvador. New Story and ICON, an Austin-based construction technologies company, built the world’s first community of 3D printed homes in Nacajuca, Mexico.

== History ==
In 2013, New Story co-founder and CEO, Brett Hagler was on a trip to Haiti where he met families living in unstable tent communities due to the 2010 earthquake that destroyed thousands of homes. Many non-profits provided immediate disaster relief, but three years after the earthquake, these families were still living in tents, unable to recover and rebuild safe homes. Hagler saw the need for long-term living solutions, and was driven to find a way to build even one new home for one family.

To do that, he looked for nonprofits that were innovative in their thinking and approach to the global housing crisis, were transparent and accountable in their solution, and were not afraid of taking risks to achieve results. When he couldn't find an organization that combined technology and transparency to fight global homelessness, he created New Story in 2014 with the help of like-minded social entrepreneurs Alexandria Lafci, Matthew Marshall, and Mike Arrietta.

In the first six months, the organization funded 16 homes with the help of donations. After applying and being one of the first charities accepted into Y Combinator, the world's top startup accelerator, New Story was challenged to build 100 homes in 100 days. The small team and donor base accomplished the goal, plus 13 more.

In the next four years, New Story expanded from Haiti to include communities in El Salvador, Bolivia, and Mexico, amounting to a total of 37 communities worldwide as of early 2022.

== Operations ==
New Story has offices in Atlanta, Georgia, and Mexico City, Mexico. They state that they operate on a transparency-first model, which allows for 100% of donor giving to be allocated directly to those in need, while their operating costs are funded by a private group of donors called the Builders.

New Story has also built partnerships with leading organizations around the world including Architectural Digest, Goldman SachseXp Realty, Glassdoor, Sotheby's International Realty, Data Blue, Redin, TikTok and G2 Crowd.

== 3D Printing ==
Each 3D-printed home is a single-story 650-square-foot structure built using a concrete-extruding printing apparatus called the Vulcan II, developed in partnership with ICON. The homes each take 24 hours to build, and cost $4,000, a fraction of traditional construction costs. Printing homes also provides "design freedom" in that printing with liquid concrete allows for all manner of shapes, and it simplifies the construction process, eliminating the need for drywall, insulation and wood framing.

The first home printed in Austin, Texas by the Vulcan I took approximately 48 hours to complete and cost $10,000.

== Reception ==
In 2016, New Story’s three founders, Brett Hagler, Matthew Marshall, and Alexandria Lafci, were named Forbes 30 Under 30. The 3D community in Nacajuca, Mexico, received more than 1 billion media impressions — gaining coverage from The New York Times, USA Today, and CNN. Apple TV+ produced a documentary showcasing the project. As of 2022, Fast Company has named New Story one of the World’s Most Innovative nonprofits four times.

Non-profit evaluator Guidestar published a review of the organization in 2018. Their overall conclusion was that New Story stands out from other organizations when it comes to giving transparency, and was awarded the 2018 silver seal of transparency.

An article published on November 18, 2015 by MGM Resorts International, Atif Rafiq stated, “There is also an added touch of human connection that makes New Story such a standout charity in my eyes. Donors have access to exclusive video footage of the families they have impacted — watching the lives of previously hopeless individuals, change — tremendously. Donors get to see these individuals smile, lighting up at the new window of hope and opportunity that will drastically redirect their paths in life.”
