= Uncorporation =

An uncorporation is an unorthodox form of large business organization. The term appears to embrace any unincorporated business.

== Description ==
An uncorporation may be formed in an effort to align managers' and owners' interests more closely than in a typical corporation, or may donate most of its profits to charity, or may pursue social responsibility goals that conflict with traditional corporate shareholder primacy. Equally, it escapes the regulatory supervision, checks and balances to which corporations are subject. Large firms structured as partnerships are sometimes regarded as uncorporations.

The rise of uncorporations resulted partly from costly corporate monitoring devices such as independent directors, owner voting, and fiduciary duties being often ineffective.

== Types ==
Publicly traded partnerships, real estate investment trusts, hedge funds and venture capital funds are other types of uncorporations. A business trust is another type of uncorporation that has long been a competition of corporation as a form of business organization.
