= Giant Killers =

Giant Killers or Giant Killer may refer to:

== Entertainment ==
- Giant Killers (EP), a 2017 EP by BiSH
- Giant Killers (video game), a 2001 video game
- "Giant Killer" (story), a 1945 short story by A. Bertram Chandler
- The Giant Killer, the British title of the 2013 American film Jack the Giant Killer
- Giantkiller, an American comic book series

== Sports ==
- Giant killers (sports), underdogs who defeat favorites (or top dogs)
  - 1967 Oregon State Beavers football team, an American college football team nicknamed "Giant Killers"

== Other uses ==
- Giant Killer (call sign), an American military aviation call sign

== See also ==
- Giant-killing (disambiguation)
