= Olympian Publishing =

Olympian Publishing is a publishing house with offices in Chicago, IL, USA.

Founded in 2005 by Peter Weglarz, the books released from Olympian Publishing have been noteworthy for high production quality, specifically re-creating the feel of vintage or antique books. In 2006 Olympian secured the rights in early 2006 to publish Dan Brereton's Nocturnals.

== Titles ==
- The Union of Hope and Sadness: The Art of Gail Potocki (2006) (with introduction by Jim Rose of The Jim Rose Circus)

An exploration of the Symbolist paintings of Gail Potocki; with more than 100 works represented and discussed, the 208 page hardcover book also includes essays from Richard Metzger, the host of BBC's Disinformation: the Series and neuroscientist Marina Korsakova-Kreyn, and portraits of Jim and Bébé Rose, Joe Coleman, Grant Morrison, and Claudio Carniero of Cirque du Soleil.

- Chamber of Mystery: Witchcraft (2007) (Various artists and authors, with introduction by Dan Brereton featuring characters from the Nocturnals)

Reprints thirteen stories from classic 1950s horror comics.

- A Nocturnal Alphabet (2007) (by Daniel Brereton)

A macabre children's poem featuring the Nocturnals, illustrated with paintings by Dan Brereton.

- Nocturnals Volume One: Black Planet and Other Stories (2007) (by Daniel Brereton)

Reprints the earliest of the Nocturnals comic stories, written and painted by Dan Brereton (with introduction by Thomas Negovan)
