= Giant-killing =

Giant-killing or giant killer may refer to:

- Killing a literal giant, such as:
  - Gigantomachy, a Greek mythological battle
  - David and Goliath, a biblical story
  - "Jack the Giant Killer", a Cornish fairy tale and legend
- Upset (competition), the victory of underdog over a favourite (or top dog)
- Giant Killing, a Japanese manga series by Masaya Tsunamoto and Tsujitomo
- Giant Killer (call sign), an American military aviation call sign
- "Giant Killer" (story), a 1945 short story by A. Bertram Chandler
- Giantkiller, a DC Comics limited series

== See also ==
- Giant Killers (disambiguation)
- Jack the Giant Killer (disambiguation)
