= Enshittification =

Decline in online platform quality

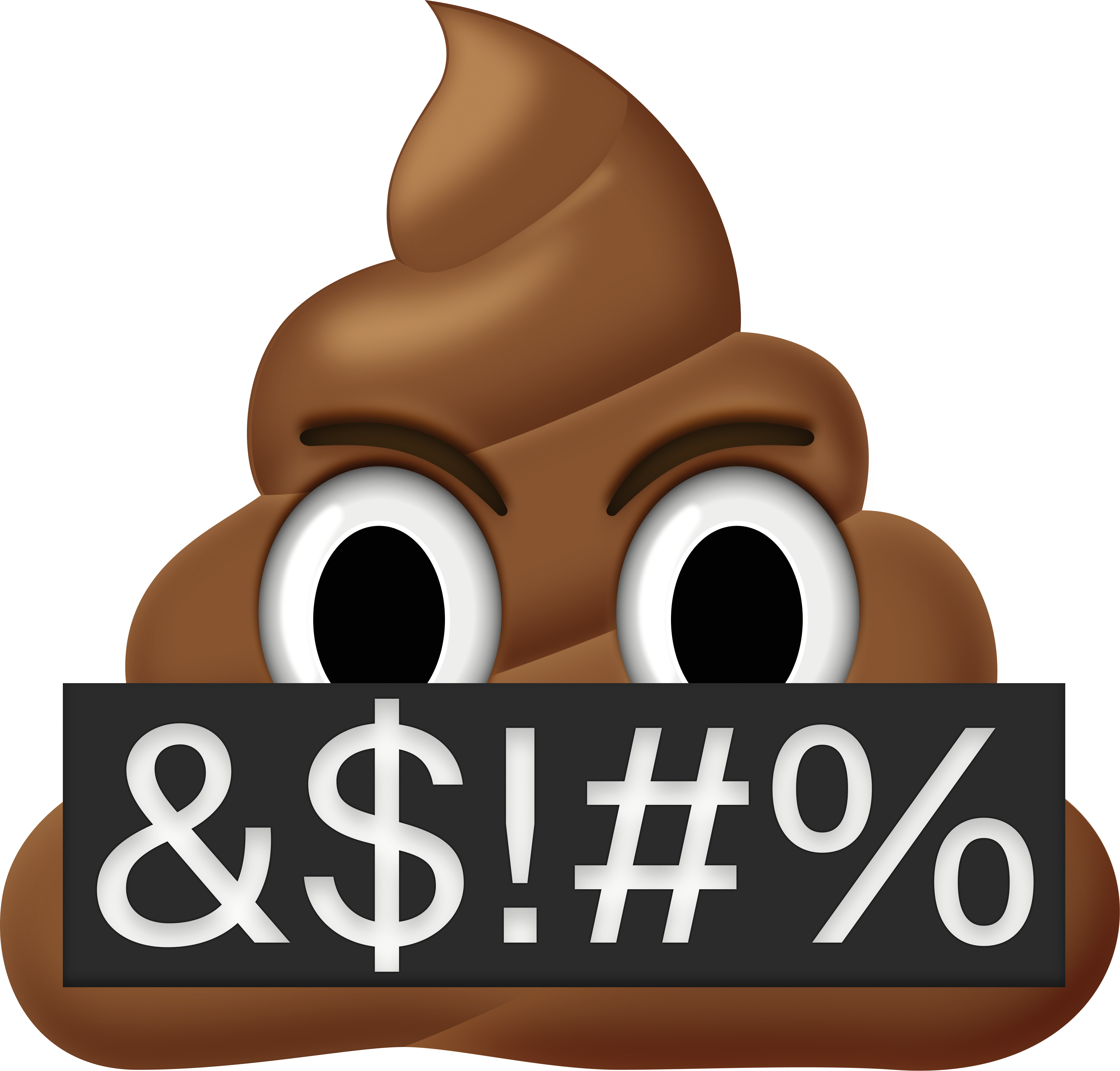
The poop emoji representation of enshittification from the cover of Doctorow's 2025 book Enshittification: Why Everything Suddenly Got Worse and What to Do About It

Enshittification, also known as platform decay, is a process in which two-sided online products and services decline in quality over time. Initially, vendors create high-quality offerings to attract users. Over time, they degrade those offerings to better serve business customers. Ultimately, they degrade their services to both users and business customers to maximise short-term profits for shareholders.

The term was popularised by Canadian writer Cory Doctorow in 2022. The American Dialect Society selected enshittification as its 2023 Word of the Year, with Australia's Macquarie Dictionary following suit for 2024.

== History and definition ==
The Oxford English Dictionary attests several uses of the word "enshittification" dating back to 2013, adding "Later popularized by ... Cory Doctorow". Cory Doctorow first used enshittification to describe service degradation, formalising his use in a November 2022 blog post that was republished three months later in Locus. He expanded on the concept in another blog post that was republished in the January 2023 edition of Wired:

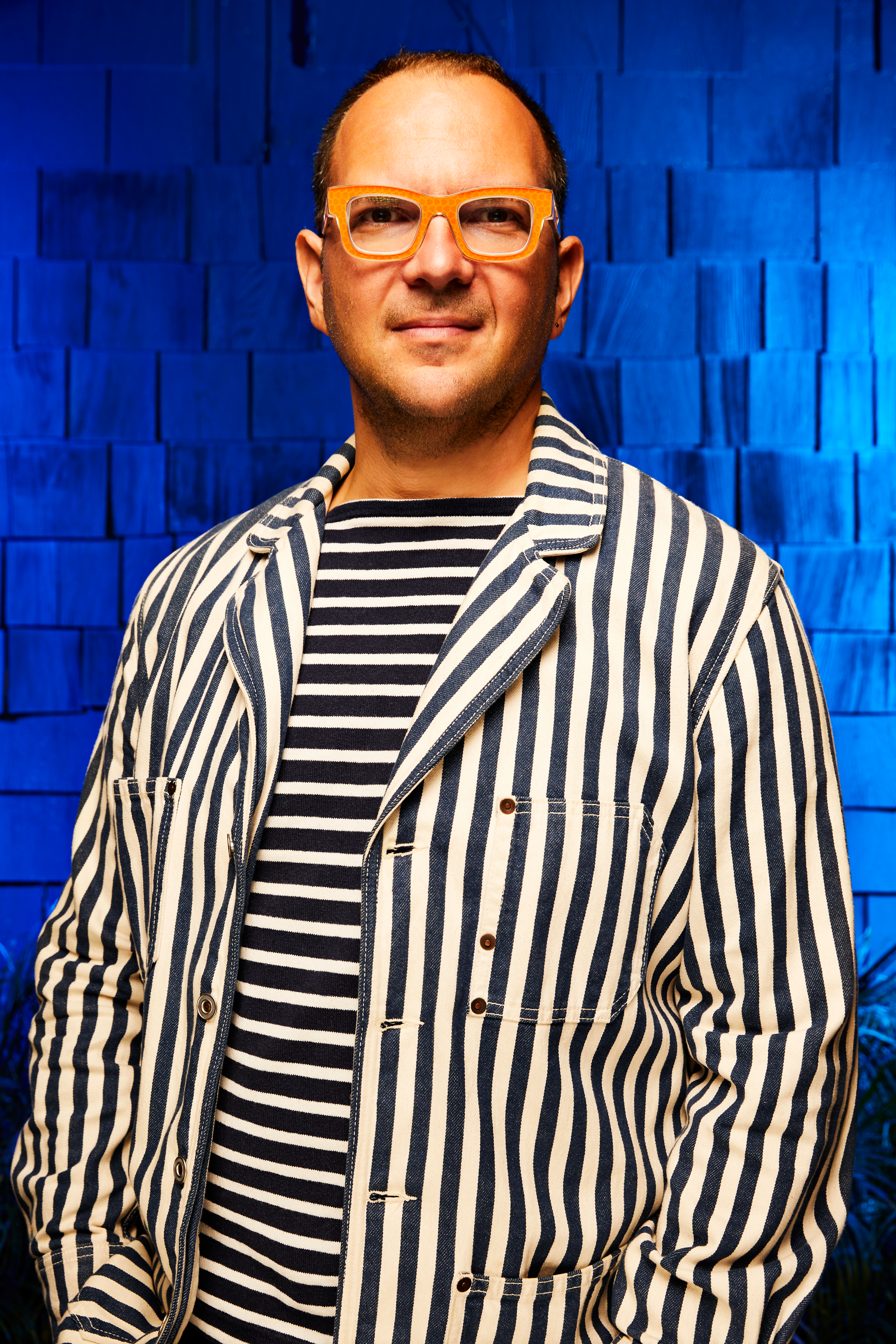
Cory Doctorow popularised the term enshittification in a 2022 blog post.

Here is how platforms die: first, they are good to their users; then they abuse their users to make things better for their business customers; finally, they abuse those business customers to claw back all the value for themselves. Then, they die. I call this enshittification, and it is a seemingly inevitable consequence arising from the combination of the ease of changing how a platform allocates value, combined with the nature of a "two-sided market", where a platform sits between buyers and sellers, hold each hostage to the other, raking off an ever-larger share of the value that passes between them.

In a 2024 op-ed in the Financial Times, Doctorow argued that enshittification was "coming for absolutely everything".

Doctorow argues that new platforms offer useful products and services at a loss, as a way to gain new users. Once users are locked in, the platform then offers access to the userbase to suppliers at a loss; once suppliers are locked in, the platform shifts surpluses to shareholders. Once the platform is fundamentally focused on the shareholders, and the users and vendors are locked in, the platform no longer has any incentive to maintain quality. Enshittified platforms that act as intermediaries can act as both a monopoly on services and a monopsony on customers, as high switching costs prevent either from leaving even when alternatives technically exist. Doctorow has described the process of enshittification as happening through "twiddling": the continual adjustment of the parameters of the system in search of marginal improvements of profits, without regard to any other goal. Enshittification can be seen as a form of rent-seeking.

"An Audacious Plan to Halt the Internet's Enshittification", a talk by Doctorow at DEF CON 31 in 2023

To solve the problem, Doctorow has called for two general principles to be followed:

- The first is a respect of the end-to-end principle, which holds that the role of a network is to reliably deliver data from willing senders to willing receivers. When applied to platforms, this entails users being given what they asked for, not what the platform prefers to present. For example, users would see all content from users they subscribed to, allowing content creators to reach their audience without going through an opaque algorithm; and in search engines, exact matches for search queries would be shown before sponsored results, rather than afterwards.
- The second is the right of exit, which holds that users of a platform can easily go elsewhere if they are dissatisfied with it. For social media, this requires interoperability, countering the network effects that "lock in" users and prevent market competition between platforms. For digital media platforms, it means enabling users to switch platforms without losing the content they purchased that is locked by digital rights management.

In October 2025, Doctorow released a book titled Enshittification: Why Everything Suddenly Got Worse and What to Do About It.

The use of the word has evolved from Doctorow's tech-platform definition to cover many disimproving facilities, from the degradation of public services to climate-crisis-related chaos events. Doctorow is quite happy with this evolution of the word, saying, "I'm not frustrated by that at all. I think it's glorious," and noted that English and Yiddish, which he describes as his "first two languages," have vocabularies in which meanings can change without language academy supervision.

== Reception ==
"Enshittification" has been cited by various scholars and journalists as a framework for understanding the decline in quality of online platforms. Discussions about the term have appeared in numerous media outlets, including analyses of how tech giants like Facebook, Google, and Amazon have shifted their business models to prioritise profits at the expense of user experience. This phenomenon has sparked debates about the need for regulatory interventions and alternative models to ensure the integrity and quality of digital platforms.

The American Dialect Society selected enshittification as its 2023 word of the year.

The Macquarie Dictionary named enshittification as its 2024 word of the year, selected by both the committee's and people's choice votes for only the third time since the inaugural event in 2006.

=== Broadening of the term ===
Following the term's popularisation, its usage broadened beyond Doctorow's original definition. The New York Times observed in 2025 that the meaning had "expanded to encompass a general vibe", with the idea applied to subjects ranging from video games and television to American democracy. Doctorow has said the word "achieved escape velocity", and in his 2025 book wrote that he was "giving you explicit permission to use this word in a loose sense". In Australia, commentary following the Macquarie Dictionary award applied the term outside the platform context to targets including supermarket self-checkouts, free-to-air television and the airline Qantas.

== Impact ==
Academic researchers have further broadened the impact of the term by applying it to labour relations and the structure of digital work. In a 2025 study, Michael David Maffie and Hector Hurtado argue that enshittification offers a useful framework for understanding how gig-economy platforms, as used, for example, by ride-hail and grocery delivery services, steadily degrade the quality of work available to independent contractors. They contend that platform companies undergo a predictable shift from providing favourable conditions to workers toward implementing policies that increase precarity, opacity, and unequal power dynamics. Their analysis positions enshittification as not only a description of consumer-facing platform decline, but a broader socio-economic process that can reshape labour markets themselves.

Philosophers Michael J. Ardoline and Edward Lenzo argue that platform decay causes cognitive harm by damaging the cognitive systems that users form with some platforms. They further argue that this damage can undermine users' capacity to pay attention, thereby constituting a moral harm as well.

Users of platforms that have suffered from enshittification have continued to stay on those platforms due to a fear of missing out but often migrate between multiple different social media. Users often cite a sense of community and nostalgia as reasons to stay on platforms despite the quality decreasing over time.

== Examples ==
=== Academic publishing ===
Between 2016 and 2022 the turnover and profit margins of academic publishers increased partly due to article processing charges from open access. This has been accompanied by predatory publishers who prioritise profit over scholarly integrity. "Academic enshittification" results in a scholarly system that is "overwhelmed by quantity, distorted by profit motives, and is stripped of its purpose of advancing knowledge."

=== Amazon ===
In Doctorow's original post, he discussed the practices of Amazon. The online retailer began by attracting users with goods sold below cost and (with an Amazon Prime subscription) free shipping. Once its user base was solidified, more sellers began to sell their products through Amazon. Finally, Amazon began to add fees to increase profits. In 2023, over 45% of the sale price of items went to Amazon in the form of various fees. Doctorow described advertisement within Amazon as a payola scheme in which sellers bid against one another for search-ranking preference, and said that the first five pages of a search for "cat beds" were half advertisements.

=== Apple ===
Doctorow has cited Apple as executing the first stage of enshittification precisely, attracting users with high-quality devices and a curated App Store before locking them in, aided by anti-circumvention law that makes obtaining iOS software elsewhere legally hazardous. Because developers cannot reach iPhone users except through the App Store, he argues, its policies acquire "the force of law", letting Apple take a commission of up to 30%.

=== Dating apps ===
The market for dating apps has been cited as an example of enshittification due to the conflict between the dating apps' ostensible goal of matchmaking, and their operators' desire to convert users to the paid version of the app and retain them as paying users indefinitely by keeping them single, creating a perverse incentive that leads performance to decline over time as efforts at monetisation begin to dominate.

=== Facebook ===
According to Doctorow, Facebook offered a good service until it had reached a "critical mass" of users, and it became difficult for people to leave because they would need to convince their friends to go with them. Facebook then began to add posts from media companies into feeds until the media companies too were dependent on traffic from Facebook, and then adjusted the algorithm to prioritise paid "boosted" posts. Doctorow pointed to the Facebook metrics controversy, in which video statistics were inflated on the site, which led to media companies over-investing in Facebook and collapsing. He described Facebook as "terminally enshittified".

=== Gig economy platforms ===
A 2025 study in the British Journal of Industrial Relations applies the concept of platform decay ("enshittification") to gig-economy work, arguing that platform practices can degrade labour conditions over time.

=== Google Search ===
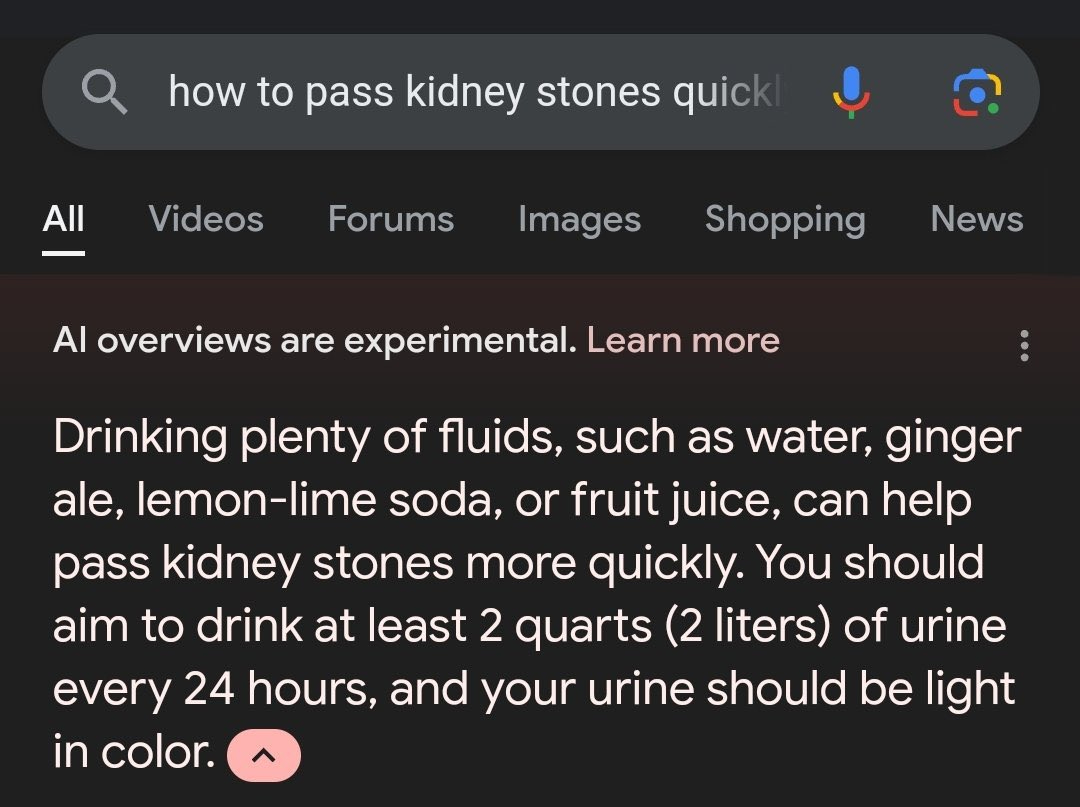
Ars Technica exemplified "enshittification" using Google Search's AI Overviews

Doctorow cites Google Search as one example, which became dominant through relevant search results and minimal ads, then later degraded through increased advertising, search engine optimisation, and outright fraud, benefitting its advertising customers. This was followed by Google rigging the ad market through Jedi Blue to recapture value for itself. Doctorow also cites Google's firing of 12,000 employees in January 2023, which coincided with a stock buyback scheme which "would have paid all their salaries for the next 27 years", as well as Google's rush to research an AI search chatbot, "a tool that won't show you what you ask for, but rather, what it thinks you should see". Ars Technica referred to the chatbot, AI Overviews, as "part of the current wave of AI-flavored enshittification", and noted how it and other large language model-based chatbots often hallucinate misinformation.

=== Reddit ===
In 2023, shortly after its initial filings for an initial public offering, Reddit announced that it would begin charging fees for API access. CEO Steve Huffman stated that it was in response to AI firms scraping data without paying Reddit for it. The move shut down large numbers of third-party apps, including the Apollo app, forcing users to use the official Reddit app. Moderators on the site conducted a blackout protest against the company's new policy, although the changes ultimately went ahead.

=== Twitter / X ===
The term was applied to the changes to Twitter in the wake of its 2022 acquisition by Elon Musk. This included the closure of the service's API to stop interoperable software from being used, suspending users for posting their handles from Twitter's rival service Mastodon in their profiles, and placing restrictions on the ability to view the site without logging in. Other changes included temporary rate limits for the number of tweets that could be viewed per day, the introduction of paid subscriptions to the service in the form of Twitter Blue (later renamed to X Premium), and the reduction of moderation.

=== Uber ===
App-based ridesharing company Uber gained market share by ignoring local licensing systems such as taxi medallions while also keeping consumer costs artificially low by subsidising rides via venture capital funding. Once they achieved a duopoly with competitor Lyft, the company implemented surge pricing to increase the cost of travel to riders and dynamically adjust the payments made to drivers.

=== Unity ===
The proposed (and eventually abandoned) changes to the Unity game engine's licensing model in 2023 were described by Gameindustry.biz as an example of enshittification, as the changes would have applied retroactively to projects which had already been in development for years, while degrading quality for both developers and end users, and increasing fees. While the Unity Engine itself is not a two-sided market, the move was related to Unity's position as a provider of mobile free-to-play services to developers, including in-app purchase systems.

In response to these changes, many game developers announced their intention to abandon Unity for an alternative engine, despite the significant switching cost of doing so, with game designer Sam Barlow specifically using the word enshittification when describing the new fee policy as the motive. Use of the Unity engine at game jams declined rapidly in 2024, as indie developers switched to other engines. Unity usage at the Global Game Jam declined to 36% that year, from 61% in 2023. The GMTK Game Jam also reported a major decline in Unity usership.

=== Other systems ===
Henry Farrell has described military hardware, the US dollar, and satellite constellations as platforms that exhibit enshittification. Countries buying US military equipment are also reliant on parts supplies, communications systems and technical support. The clearing of international dollar transactions is processed by a small number of US-regulated institutions. Countries using the Starlink satellite system are reliant on a single company with connections to the US government.

== See also ==
- Channel drift – Phenomena of programming format changes by television networks
- Dark pattern – Deceptive user interface designs
- Echo chamber (media) – Situation that reinforces beliefs by repetition inside a closed system
- Embrace, extend, and extinguish – Anti-competitive business strategy
- Freemium – Free product where the extras require payment
- Planned obsolescence – Product design with limited useful life
