= Thomas Negovan =

- Born: Thomas Joseph Negovan III; November 8, 1971 (age 54); Chicago, Illinois, United States
- Genres: Art rock; alternative rock; indie rock
- Occupations: Singer-songwriter, multi-instrumentalist, writer, orchestra director
- Instruments: Voice, 12-string guitar, harp guitar, piano
- Years active: 1991–present
- Website: https://www.thomasnegovan.com, https://centuryguild.wordpress.com

Thomas Negovan (born November 8, 1971) is a writer, musician, and art historian from Chicago. He regularly lectures on Art Nouveau and Weimar-era Berlin cabaret.

== Biography ==
In 1995, Negovan formed a rock band, Three Years Ghost, which released one album, Sidhe (1995), and performed infrequently in the Chicago area until 2003. He recorded and performed under the ensemble name Ver Sacrum, releasing one CD single, The Ballrooms of Mars. In 2011, Negovan gave a TEDx talk titled By Popular Demand on his experience recording with archaic technologies, and both recorded and released a single on the early recording medium of wax cylinder, the first such release in nearly a century. A full album by the same name was recorded without electricity, mastered to tape, and then pressed to vinyl, making this a fully analog release.

In 1999, Negovan founded Century Guild, a private art gallery specializing in Art Nouveau, Symbolist Art, and German Expressionism. The gallery presented rare ceramics, and early art posters by artists like Alphonse Mucha, and focused on rare opera, cabaret, and silent film posters by Italian, German, and Austrian poster artists including Adolfo Hohenstein, Josef Fenneker, and Gustav Klimt. Century Guild also represented contemporary artists including Gail Potocki, Steve Kilbey, Dave McKean, and Jeremy Bastian. The gallery opened a large physical location to the public in Chicago in 2010 and hosted exhibitions centered on the Grand-Guignol theater and Silent Cinema, offering period works alongside contemporary interpretations by artists including Olivia De Berardinis, Bill Sienkiewicz, David Mack, Yoann Lossel, Dean Karr, Steve Diet Goedde, Chris Mars, and Christopher Ulrich, and featured exhibition posters by Malleus Rock Art Lab. The gallery closed this location in 2012, moving to Culver City, California.

In 2006, Negovan wrote and curated The Union of Hope and Sadness: The Art of Gail Potocki, with an introduction by Jim Rose of The Jim Rose Circus. The book was an analysis of the Symbolist paintings of Gail Potocki, and also included essays from Richard Metzger and Marina Korsakova-Kreyn, and portraits of Jim and Bébé Rose, Joe Coleman, Grant Morrison, and Claudio Carniero of Cirque du Soleil.

In 2010, he released the catalog Grand Guignol: An Exhibition of Artworks Celebrating the Legendary Theater of Terror, which featured rare historical images (1895–1962) from the Théâtre du Grand-Guignol, the Parisian theater which gained notoriety for lurid exhibitions of violence, death, and debauchery. The book also featured works by Gustav Klimt and Alphonse Mucha, as well as works by contemporary artists Chris Mars, Dave McKean, Gail Potocki, Michael Zulli, and Malleus Rock Art Lab, some of them being published for the first time.

Negovan has also edited a number of publications, including: Chamber of Mystery: Witchcraft (2007), which featured various artists and authors, and an introduction by Dan Brereton featuring characters from the Nocturnals, and reprints thirteen stories from 1950s horror comics, selected by Negovan; and Nocturnals Volume One: Black Planet and Other Stories (2007), reprints of the earliest of the Nocturnals comic stories, written and painted by Dan Brereton with an introduction by Negovan.

In 2016, after twenty years of research and three years of writing, Negovan wrote Le Pater: Alphonse Mucha's Symbolist Masterpiece and the Lineage of Mysticism, receiving praise from numerous artists including Roger Dean and Alex Grey. A 2023 expanded softcover included an introduction by fantasy author Michael Moorcock, who called the book "profound and beautiful" and "a source of beauty and intellectual inspiration."

The 1980 film Caligula, starring Malcolm McDowell and Helen Mirren, was notorious for being overtaken by producer and Penthouse magazine founder Bob Guccione, who fired the director, and inserted adult content without the knowledge of the writer, director, or cast; by the time of the film's release, the writer had sued to have his name removed from the film, and the director refused credit. McDowell called the 1980 release of the film a "terrible betrayal of... the actors." In 2019 Negovan was hired to utilize the original camera negatives and reconstruct a version closer to the original vision of the creators, leading to an invitation to premiere at the 2023 Cannes Film Festival. McDowell responded positively to this version, writing on Instagram: "Because of the brilliant work of Thomas Negovan – one of my best performances has finally come to light after 47 years!"
