= Jack the Giant Killer (disambiguation) =

"Jack the Giant Killer" is a Cornish fairy tale and legend.

Jack the Giant Killer may also refer to:

== Film ==
- Jack the Giant Killer (1922 film), an American animated fantasy short film by Laugh-O-Gram Studio
- Jack the Giant Killer (1962 film), an American heroic fantasy adventure film
- Jack the Giant Slayer, originally titled Jack the Giant Killer, a 2013 American film
- Jack the Giant Killer (2013 film), an American fantasy film

== Other uses ==
- Jack, the Giant Killer (novel), a 1987 novel by Charles de Lint
- Jack the Giantkiller, a 1982 video game

== See also ==
- Giant-killing (disambiguation)
- Jack and the Beanstalk (disambiguation)
- Johnny the Giant Killer, a 1950 French animated film
