= Alien Blue =

iOS application for Reddit (2010–2016)

- Logo used following acquisition by Reddit

- Screenshot The front page of Reddit as seen through the Alien Blue client
- Other names: AlienBlue
- Original author: Jason Morrissey
- Developer: Reddit
- Release: May 29, 2010; 16 years ago
- Final release: 2.9.10 / December 20, 2015; 10 years ago
- Written in: Objective-C
- Operating system: iOS
- Platform: ARM
- Successor: Reddit
- Size: 34.2 MB
- Available in: English
- Type: Reddit client
- License: Proprietary
- Website: reddit.com/r/alienblue

Alien Blue, previously stylized as AlienBlue, was an iOS application for browsing Reddit developed by Jason "Jase" Morrissey. It was available for the iPhone, the iPod Touch, and had a special optimised "HD" version for the iPad.

Initially released in May 2010 on the App Store, Alien Blue rapidly became popular, soon overshadowing Reddit's own iReddit application. Reddit acquired Alien Blue in October 2014 and made it the official Reddit app for iOS. In April 2016, citing an aging codebase, the app was discontinued and replaced with a rewritten official Reddit application for both iOS and Android.

Alien Blue featured a number of browsing and quality-of-life improvements over other apps and the Reddit website at the time, and was praised by users and critics throughout its lifespan. It was the most popular iOS Reddit application at the time of its discontinuation.

== History ==
The first version of Alien Blue appeared in the App Store on May 29, 2010, for iPhone and iPod Touch, as an alternative to the iReddit app, the official Reddit app for iPhones at the time. The new app was promoted by Melbourne-based sole developer Jason "Jase" Morrissey in several subreddits. Morrissey built the app in the Objective-C programming language, and cited his inexperience with Java as the reason for the app's lack of an Android version.

The app received continual free updates for newer iOS versions and iPhones up to its discontinuation, such as an update in 2014 that implemented support for iOS 8 and the larger screen sizes of the then-new iPhone 6 and iPhone 6 Plus.

=== Reddit acquisition ===
After Alien Blue became the most popular Reddit app on the iOS App Store, the iReddit app (the result of a collaboration with an outside contractor) was essentially abandoned due to a lack of resources, and Alien Blue was officially acquired by Reddit on October 15, 2014 for an undisclosed sum and made Reddit's new official app for iOS. Reddit did not previously have an official app for iOS, following the shuttering of iReddit approximately a year and a half earlier; VentureBeat reported that it was "unofficially" the official app internally regardless, due to its use by some Reddit employees, who had decided to forgo development of their own app at the time.

Developer Jason Morrissey was also officially hired by Reddit, after having worked closely with Reddit unofficially for years prior, although he continued to work independently from Australia following the acquisition. Reddit's head of partnership and strategic development (later interim-CEO) Ellen Pao said of the acquisition:

"We want to be able to have new features from Reddit.com show up on mobile faster and better. With Alien Blue and Jase, it was getting to a point where it was too much work for one person. He was helping us, we were helping him and the fit was really strong."

The "Alien Blue" branding was retained in the acquisition, but the subtitle "reddit official client" was added to the App Store listing. The app's logo was also slightly tweaked, and pricing options were also simplified as compared to previously.

Following its acquisition, the application required a redownload for users, as the App Store binary was considered separate from the previous version. It was released alongside an official Reddit "AMA" app (now defunct) for the r/IAmA subreddit as part of a broader effort to boost Reddit's mobile offerings. Reddit was criticised during this period for inconsistency in its mobile approach. Settings could be transitioned from the older Alien Blue version to the Reddit-owned version, and users could upgrade to the "Pro" tier for free for one week from release.

=== End of support ===
After struggling to work with and overhaul Alien Blue's aging codebase, Alien Blue was phased out by Reddit in favor of a new, rewritten Reddit app that officially launched on iOS on April 7, 2016, following a launch on Android. The Alien Blue app continued to be accessible for those that had previously downloaded it, but was removed from the App Store for new users. Its internal development team was transferred to the new Reddit app. Then-vice president of product, Alex Le, cited customer confusion with the "Alien Blue" name in influencing the decision to delist the older app; Reddit had previously indicated a desire to continue the Alien Blue branding at the time of acquisition. Le further emphasised the team's learnings from the Alien Blue app about "what makes a great iOS app", and how these learnings had been incorporated into the new app. The Verge described the new mobile apps as looking like "souped-up versions of Alien Blue", preserving features from the older app such as a low-light mode.

Before the app's discontinuation, all "Pro" users of Alien Blue were gifted four free years of Reddit Gold (Reddit's premium subscription service at the time) to compensate, allowing ad-free browsing in the new Reddit app as long as the subscription was active. All logged in users of the new Reddit app during the week of release were also given three free months of Reddit Gold.

As of September 2025, all versions of Alien Blue (and its predecessor, iReddit) are still fully functional. Being former official Reddit apps, Alien Blue and iReddit were not impacted by the 2023 API lockdown. However, these apps are not able to use features introduced after their discontinuation, such as Reddit Chat, Reddit Answers, and the new login flow, meaning you cannot log in to your Reddit account.

== Features ==
The app came to encompass many quality-of-life features, such as a search feature, login functionality, and third-party integrations. It also featured moderator tools, notifications, and direct image uploading to Imgur.

It had a "Pro" tier that allowed additional functionality, available as an in-app purchase within the app for $2. Some of this added functionality included a tilt scroll mechanism, support for multiple logged in accounts, and an ability to "hide all" posts, which would result in a fresh selection of posts with each refresh.

Other functionality included a night mode that allowed easier reading in dark environments, as well as a "speed read" button.

=== iPad and planned macOS versions ===
An iPad version of Alien Blue dubbed "Alien Blue HD" was released on September 15, 2010. It received a major 2.0 update in March 2012, with features such as support for Retina displays and much-improved support for gestures. The iPad version was made free upon Reddit's acquisition of the app, and eventually phased out in favor of a universal binary.

Alien Blue also had a native macOS version planned that was teased in June 2011. Its appearance would have been similar to the iOS version, and shared the same Objective-C codebase, but would have featured a larger multi-panel interface. It also would have utilised HTML5 technology for viewing of media from online services like YouTube and Vimeo.

== Reception ==
Alien Blue was popular with both users and reviewers; at the time of its acquisition by Reddit, it was the most popular Reddit app for iPhone and iPad. Greg Kumparak of TechCrunch called it the "undisputed champ" of Reddit clients on iOS, and Nick Stratt of The Verge said it stood out as the "most polished" and most used Reddit client of the time period. Federico Viticci of MacStories praised its "clean design" and multitude of features such as subreddit categories, subreddit shortcuts, and inline media viewing, also praising its integrations with third-party services of the time, such as Read It Later (now known as Pocket), Readability, and Instapaper. He praised Reddit's acquisition of the app, as opposed to a less powerful competing app, speculating that they could continue to add power features.

Christian Selig, the developer of the third-party Apollo client for iOS, later cited Alien Blue as an inspiration for Apollo's design. He praised Alien Blue's "minimal, uncluttered UI", inline content previews in comments, and the ability to swipe to collapse comments, while also criticising Reddit for deviating too far from Alien Blue in their rewritten Reddit application.

Alien Blue's classic icon is available in the modern Reddit app as an option for Reddit Premium subscribers.
