= Pivot to video =

Trend in content published by media

"Pivot to video" is a phrase referring to the trend, starting in 2015, of media publishing companies cutting staff resources for written content (generally published on their own web sites) in favor of short-form video content (often published on third-party platforms such as Facebook, Instagram, Twitter, YouTube, Snapchat, and TikTok). These moves were generally presented by publishers as a response to changes in social media traffic or to changes in the media consumption habits of younger audiences. However, many media commentators have argued that this shift was primarily motivated by advertising revenue, and that only advertisers, not consumers, prefer video over text. The pivot's contribution to job loss in the media industry has given the phrase "pivot to video" an association with decline, especially in a business context.

Commentators have also noted a lack of transparency and accuracy in the viewership metrics reported by platforms such as Facebook, pointing out that abrupt shifts in platforms' proprietary algorithms can have devastating effects on publishers' viewership, traffic, and revenue. Following a scandal in which Facebook revealed it had artificially inflated numbers to its advertisers about how long viewers watched ads, many journalists and industry analysts concluded that the shift to video was based on such misleading or inaccurate metrics, which created a false impression that there was customer demand for additional video content.

== History ==
Streaming media technology has been available since the early 1990s, though it was relatively low-fidelity and not widely available until the mid-2000s. In 2007, traditional media publishers including the New York Times, Washington Post and Time Inc. created new divisions to develop web videos, and Facebook launched its video platform. Twitter purchased micro-video service Vine in October 2012, began adding native video streaming in late 2014, and acquired video-streaming service Periscope in January 2015.

An August 2014 profile on BuzzFeed noted the publisher's large investment into video production, and observed that "the future of BuzzFeed may not even be on BuzzFeed.com. One of the company’s nascent ideas, BuzzFeed Distributed, will be a team of 20 people producing content that lives entirely on other popular platforms, like Tumblr, Instagram or Snapchat."

On 7 January 2015, Facebook issued a statement about "the shift to video," reporting that "since June 2014, Facebook has averaged more than 1 billion video views every day." Media critic John Herrman argued that "What the shift to Facebook video means is that Facebook is more interested in hosting the things media companies make than just spreading them, that it views links to outside pages as a problem to be solved, and that it sees Facebook-hosted video as an example of the solution."

In February 2015, the digital video-journalism publisher NowThis announced that it would operate without a home page, producing content to be published directly on social media platforms.

In April 2016, Mashable fired much of its editorial staff, attempting to pivot away from hard news coverage while "growing Mashable across every platform" and doubling down on branded content and video. By December 2017, following a sale to Ziff Davis, Mashable retreated from this focus on video; Bernard Gershon, president of GershonMedia, said that the announcement of many such "pivots" were actually aimed primarily at investors.

By 2017, "advertiser interest in video [was] insatiable... Any CFO is going to say 'How can we get more video?'" according to an executive of the publishers' trade association Digital Content Next. Publishers such as Vanity Fair, the Washington Post, and Sports Illustrated began adapting their own articles into cheap video content, either dictated by a newsreader or animated as a slideshow with captions, which could be shared on social platforms or even played alongside the articles themselves.

June 2017 saw numerous high-profile pivots to video. Vocativ laid off at least 20 staff, including its entire newsroom, explaining that "as the industry evolves, we are undertaking a strategic shift to focus exclusively on video content that will be distributed via social media and other platforms." Fox Sports eliminated its entire writing staff to focus on creating "premium video across all platforms." And MTV News announced a restructuring that would cut its writing team. Less than two years earlier, MTV News had hired Grantland co-founder Dan Fierman to lead a significant investment in "longform" political and cultural reporting, but Fierman left in April 2017, and in June MTV announced it was "shifting resources into short-form video content more in line with young people's media consumption habits."

In July, Vice Media laid off at least 60 employees, including the editor-in-chief of Vice Sports, while expanding video production.

August 2017 saw Mic cut ten writers and directed the remainder of the newsroom to generate videos for social platforms. CEO Chris Altchek said "When you think about how many hours people spend watching video versus reading, the audience has already spoken." The move was ultimately unsuccessful, and Mic laid off the majority of its staff a year later before being sold to Bustle Media Group for a fraction of its former value.

In September 2017, the for-profit wiki-hosting company Fandom began adding commercially produced videos to its otherwise user-generated wiki subdomains, explicitly citing the need to "keep up with user and advertiser expectations" by "diversifying our content," claiming without substantiation that "consumer patterns are changing," necessitating the addition of "complementary video" to accommodate that supposed need. Objection to the content in these videos and its sharp contrast against the content of the wiki sites to which they were applied led to vocal user backlash, leading Fandom CCO Dorth Raphaely to offer the following non-committal response: "I agree that with these videos in particular we did not deliver the right type of content experience."

Movie Pilot CEO Tobi Bauckhage explained his company's fall 2017 layoffs as part of moving "from a text-based publishing model to video... a reaction to the fact that Facebook has changed their algorithms in favor of video instead of referral traffic over the last 12 months and we were losing money in the publishing bit of our business." As part of the company's change in direction, the majority of its staff was laid off and its parent company was sold to Webedia.

In November 2017, magazine publisher Condé Nast cut jobs, reduced the frequency of several magazines, and shut down the print edition of Teen Vogue, then invested significant new resources in video production, with a senior executive saying "In the next 24 months, I hope that video is half our business... It’s critical. It’s the macro trend of content consumption."

In February 2018, Vox Media cut approximately 50 employees, primarily those assigned to "social video," as Vox CEO Jim Bankoff admitted that those efforts were not "viable audience or revenue growth drivers."

In August 2020, Facebook Inc. (now Meta Platforms) pivoted Instagram to video in an effort to replicate the success of TikTok and appeal to a younger audience, introducing "reels" as a form of video and promoting them aggressively. Reels accounted more than half the 20 most-viewed posts on Facebook; however, most of these reels were anonymous aggregations of content from TikTok.

Elon Musk declared in early 2024 that X (formerly Twitter) was now a "video-first platform", which has been described by critics as a "pivot to video".

== As euphemism ==
In 2017, Journalist Brian Feldman said that "'Pivoting to video' has become a business strategy for digital publishers common enough in recent months to be a kind of cliché — a slick way to describe something else: layoffs." In response, writers use the phrase as gallows humor shorthand for death or cancellation, as in "how do i tell my bf i want our relationship to pivot to video" (SkyNews' Mollie Goodfellow) or "Horse broke its leg, so we had to take it out back and help it 'pivot to video'" (blogger Anil Dash).

== Facebook metrics controversy ==
In September 2016, Facebook admitted that it had reported artificially inflated numbers to its advertisers about how long viewers watched ads leading to an overestimation of 60-80%. Plaintiffs in a later court case allege the discrepancy was as high as 150-900%. Facebook apologized in an official statement and in multiple staff appearances at New York Advertising Week. Two months later, Facebook disclosed additional discrepancies in audience metrics. In October 2018, a California federal court unsealed the text of a class action lawsuit filed by advertisers against Facebook, alleging that Facebook had known since 2015 that its viewership numbers were highly inflated, that internal records showed it "was far from an honest mistake", that Facebook waited over a year before taking action to disclose or fix the problem, citing internal communications that "somehow there was no progress on the task for the year" and decisions to "obfuscate the fact that we screwed up the math."

This led many journalists and industry analysts to conclude that the shift to video was based on misleading or inaccurate metrics, which created a false impression that there was customer demand for additional video content.

== See also ==
- Digital first, another shift in publishing production
- Enshittification
- Chokepoint Capitalism
