= Beanstalk =

Beanstalk may refer to:

- Beanstalk, the stem of a bean plant
- Beanstalk, 1994 film directed by Michael Davis
- AWS Elastic Beanstalk, a part of Amazon's cloud computing platform
- Space elevator, also referred to as a beanstalk

== See also ==
- Jack and the Beanstalk (disambiguation)
