= Jack and the Beanstalk (disambiguation) =

"Jack and the Beanstalk" is an English fairy tale.

Jack and the Beanstalk may also refer to:

== Film ==
- Jack and the Beanstalk (1902 film), an American short film directed by George S. Fleming and Edwin S. Porter
- Jack and the Beanstalk (1917 film), an American fantasy film directed by Chester M. Franklin and Sidney Franklin
- Jack and the Beanstalk (1924 film) written and directed by Alfred J. Goulding
- Jack and the Beanstalk (1931 film), a Betty Boop cartoon
- Jack and the Beanstalk (1952 film), an American comedy film starring Abbott and Costello
- Jack and the Beanstalk (1967 film), a live-action/animated-hybrid musical-themed film
- Jack and the Beanstalk (1970 film), American film that was featured in Santa and the Ice Cream Bunny
- Jack and the Beanstalk (1974 film), a Japanese animated film
- Jack and the Beanstalk (2009 film), an American family film
- Jack the Giant Slayer, a 2013 American fantasy film which draws on the "Jack" fairy tales

== Series ==
- Jack and the Beanstalk: The Real Story, a 2001 American television miniseries
- "Jack and the Beanstalk", a 2007 episode of Super Why! (S01E04)
- "The Warners and the Beanstalk", a 1994 episode in Animaniacs (S01E51) which spoofs the fairy tale
- "Pups and the Beanstalk", a 2014 episode of Paw Patrol (S01E23a) which spoofs the fairy tale

== Music ==
- "Jack and the Beanstalk", a rap song from the album Bastard by Tyler, the Creator
- "Jack and the Beanstalk", a composition for eight instruments and a narrator by Janika Vandervelde

== Video games ==
- Jack and the Beanstalk, a cancelled video game that was turned into Pokémon Snap

== See also ==
- Jack-Wabbit and the Beanstalk
- Beanstalk Bunny
- Beanstalk (disambiguation)
- Jack the Giant Killer (disambiguation)
