= Digital first =

Digital first is a communication theory that publishers should release content into new media channels in preference to old media. The premise behind the theory is that after the advent of Internet, most established media organizations continued to give priority to traditional media. Over time, those organizations faced a choice to either publish first in digital media or traditional media. A "digital first" decision occurs when a publisher chooses to distribute information online in preference to or at the expense of traditional media like print publishing.

Many employers and employees find it challenging to imagine using digital first practices.

Distributing content digital first introduces new practices, including a need to manage the data which tracks readership.

Many paper print publishers feel intimidated by the idea of publishing content online before publishing it in paper media.

Comedian John Oliver in the show Last Week Tonight criticized digital first practices as a cause of lower standards in journalism.

== Digital-First Transformation in Business and Education ==
The classical perspective of an information system is that it represents and reflects physical reality. However, it is increasingly evident that digital technologies not only represent reality but also actively shape it, as, in many instances, the digital version is created first, and the physical version follows. Gradually, digital infrastructures are integrated in people's work and life, shaping a digital environment through technologies such as 5G, sensors, and blockchain.

The Digital First Framework, developed by Professor Youngjin Yoo, is a conceptual approach that helps the physical companies in the integration of digital technologies into the core of product and service design. The shift from traditional cars, where the physical vehicle precedes its digital representation on Google maps, to autonomous vehicles, where the digital representation (the blue dot) is created first, emphasizes the digital-first mindset in the design and operation of systems.

In today's business environment, it's critical for organizations to embrace a digital-first strategy. Companies built on digital platforms will significantly diverge from traditional, hierarchical business structures that typically focus on a single product or market. These digitally-centered enterprises will offer products and services that are tailored to individual requirements, utilizing algorithms to assess needs based on specific situations, and relying on external partners to provide these solutions. This highlights the need to transform traditional R&D practices. It's essential for R&D teams to move beyond their laboratories and immerse themselves in the environments of their users. Understanding the context of use is fundamental to creating a relevant platform.

As an illustration, the concept of Digital-first, as defined by Rohm et al. (2019), involves the integration of digital projects within educational courses, exemplified by institutions like M-School. The program adopts a programmatic approach, where successive courses progressively build upon one another, adopting an all-encompassing perspective that regards all aspects of marketing as inherently digital. Students actively participate in real-world projects, including campaigns for community improvement, and are tasked with generating content for diverse platforms. Through hands-on collaboration with live clients and the utilization of tools such as Google AdWords and Facebook Advertising, students acquire practical experience in the realms of digital marketing and analytics.

== vBook ==
A vBook is an eBook that is digital first media with embedded video, images, graphs, tables, text, and other media.

== See also ==
- Pivot to video, another shift in publishing production
- Enshittification
