= Gail Potocki =

American painter (born 1961)

Silence, 2001

Gail Potocki (born 1961, Detroit, Michigan, U.S.) is a Symbolist artist utilizing the skills and techniques of the Old Masters in the 21st century. Influenced by 19th-century artists like Fernand Khnopff, Jean Delville, and Dante Gabriel Rossetti, Potocki's first monograph, The Union of Hope and Sadness: The Art of Gail Potocki was released in the Summer of 2006 and features text by Thomas Negovan, Richard Metzger and Jim Rose of the Jim Rose Circus. Gail was the First Place winner of the First International Online Symbolist Art Exhibition.

Gail currently lives in Chicago.

== Television, interviews ==
- Life's Lesson: The Studios of Howard Street, Channel 21, Chicago, Jan 2004
- Iz This Art?, Channel 26, Chicago, March 2002
- ArtBeat Chicago: "Preserving the Arts: Drawing on the Past", PBS Channel 11, Chicago, October 18, 2000 (regularly re-run)

== Books ==
- The Union of Hope and Sadness: The Art of Gail Potocki (2006) by Thomas Negovan with introduction by Jim Rose of The Jim Rose Circus

An exploration of the Symbolist painting of Gail Potocki; more than 100 works are represented and discussed. The 208 page hardcover book also includes essays from Richard Metzger, the host of BBC's Disinformation: the Series and neuroscientist Marina Korsakova-Kreyn.

== Press ==
- The Sentimentalist magazine, Winter 2001: "Gail Potocki: A Modern Symbolist"
- ArtsOnline: The Arts Council of England online news magazine, September 9, 2002: "No Longer a Dream but a Reality"
- Inscape magazine, Winter 2002: "When Dreams Become a Reality"
- American Artist Drawing magazine, Winter 2005: "Gail Potocki"
- "Snake Oil", author: Jim Rose

== Exhibitions ==
- Gail Potocki's art has been exhibited in the US, Germany, Austria, Italy, Switzerland, and Scotland.
