= Giant Killers (video game) =

2000 video game

- Developer(s): IO Productions; Smoking Gun Productions
- Publisher(s): AAA Game Ltd
- Platform(s): Microsoft Windows; Dreamcast
- Release: Microsoft Windows: EU: 2000; Dreamcast: EU: May 11, 2001
- Genre(s): Soccer Management Simulation
- Mode(s): Single-player

Giant Killers is a football-management simulation video game developed by IO Productions and Smoking Gun Productions and published by AAA Game for Microsoft Windows in 2000. A Dreamcast-port, also developed by IO Productions and Smoking Gun Productions, was published the following year. It is the only football management simulation game to be released on the Dreamcast.

== Gameplay ==
Players are able to manage one of 112 teams from the English Premier League, the Football League, or the Conference, with squads from the 1999–2000 season. The game offers three difficulty levels, Easy to Hard, which dictate the transfer funds players start the season with and the complexity of the gameplay.

A separate PC-only release, Giant Killers Euro Manager 2000, gives players the opportunity to manage the England team through the European Championships.

A third version, which was to feature "three dimensional graphics" was announced by On-line Sports for release in February 2002, but did not make it to market.

== Development ==
The PC release was developed by On-Line Sports and Smoking Gun Productions, with a team of seven across IO Productions and Smoking Gun Productions porting the game to the Dreamcast. For the port the core management engine was retained from the PC version, but the screen layout, navigation system and user interface were redesigned to work with the Dreamcast controller. To determine the attributes of the over 3,000 players in the game's database the developers contacted club fanzines and supporters, as well as drawing on the Rothmans Football Yearbook.

== Reception ==
Reception

Review scores
Publication	Score
BBC Sport	78/100 (Dreamcast)
CVG	3/5 (PC)
Daily Telegraph	3.5/5 (PC)
Dreamcast Magazine	70/10
Guardian	2/5 (PC), 3/5 (Dreamcast)
Official Dreamcast Magazine	7/10

Writing in Official Dreamcast Magazine Steve Key gave Giant Killers a score of 7/10, describing it as a "good, solid management game" that "does exceptionally well at providing those with little or no experience of this type of title with an instantly accessible and enjoyable experience". However, the review also criticised the lack of up to date squads and the simple, repetitive nature of the gameplay. BBC Sport's David Gibbon gave the title a score of 78/100, noting that "While the graphics are nothing to write home about, Giant Killers is still a very playable management game that gives players lots of control over tactics and strategy." Dreamcast Magazine's Russell Murray awarded the game 70/100, writing that while "it may not be in quite the same league as Championship Manager on PC...this is still a highly entertaining management game with plenty of tactical options". Writing in The Guardian Greg Howson gave the game 3/5 stars, noting its position as the only management sim on the console, but lamenting "a niggling feeling of genre-incompatibility, with hard drives and monitors seemingly more conducive to sheepskin wearing glory".

Reviewing the PC release, William Brown of The Daily Telegraph wrote that "younger gamers will like Giant Killers relative simplicity, as will fanatical Davids aiming to topple Premier Goliaths", noting "nice tactical touches" and "uninspiring" match commentary. The PC release received a score of 2/5 in The Guardian, with it described as "not a Championship Manager 3 killer", but rather a "simplified game" that "not even 11 year olds will find absorbing for long". Lee Skittrell's review of the Euro Manager 2000 release on PC in CVG gave the title 3/5 stars, describing it as "great for management newbies...but will ultimately prove too simplistic for hardcore players".
