= Nocturnals =

1994–95 comic book series by Dan Brereton

- Cover art for Nocturnals: Black Planet
- Created by: Dan Brereton

Publication information
- Publisher: Bravura (Malibu Comics); Dark Horse Comics; Oni Press; Image Comics
- Schedule: Monthly
Title(s)
The Nocturnals
Witching Hour
Troll Bridge
The Dark Forever
Carnival of Beasts
- Formats: Original material for the series has been published as a strip in the comics anthology(s) Dark Horse Presents and a set of limited series and one-shot comics.
- Original language: English
- Genre: Horror
- Publication date: January 1995 – present
- Main character(s): Doc Horror; Halloween Girl; Polychrome; Firelion; Starfish; The Raccoon; Komodo; Gunwitch

Reprints
- Collected editions
- Black Planet & Other Tales: ISBN 0-9786326-2-1
- Dark Forever & Other Tales: ISBN 1607060655

Nocturnals is a comic book title created by artist Dan Brereton which debuted as a six-part limited series in 1994–1995 under Malibu Comics collectively subtitled as Black Planet.

It follows the supernatural exploits of Doc Horror and his daughter Eve in Pacific City, a fictional California town which seems to have more than its fair share of paranormal activity. The series is noted for its eclectic combination of pulp storytelling, fantastic creatures, moody atmosphere, Halloween style and colorful characters, as well as Brereton's signature painted art style.

== Publication history ==
The eponymous original limited series ran in 1995 and was published under Malibu Comics' Bravura imprint. This was followed by a story that ran in Dark Horse Presents #125–127 (October–November 1997) that was collected by Dark Horse Comics into a 48-page comic book as The Nocturnals: Witching Hour (May 1998). Moving to Oni Press the next outing was in a giant-sized one-shot The Nocturnals: Troll Bridge (October 2000). The Nocturnals: The Dark Forever was a three-issue mini-series that started in 2001 (July 2001 – February 2002). A spin-off mini-series from Oni Press followed, called The Gunwitch: Outskirts of Doom (June–August 2001). After leaving Oni Press, Image Comics later published The Nocturnals: Carnival of Beasts (July 2008), a prestige format 64-page comic book, published by Image Comics, containing three stories.

"Nocturnals: Legend" was released by BigWowArt (October 2014), a hardcover coffee-table style art book, described as a 20-year "introspective".

Nocturnals: The Sinister Path is a graphic novel that was released through BigWowArt in June 2017.

== Plot ==
Joining the Horror family is a group of societal outcasts who shun the light of day and avoid mainstream society: spectral apparition, Polychrome; amphibious spitfire, Starfish; pyrokinetic swordsman, Firelion; reptilian, Komodo; streetwise animal-human chimera, Raccoon; and the silent undead gunslinger, Gunwitch. They live in or frequent Doc Horror's underground sanctuary called the Tomb, both home and fortress to the group, as they battle the criminal underworld and various supernatural threats which often rear up in nearby Pacific City.

Doc Horror's chief nemeses are the Crim, a parasitic species of extradimensional conquerors who ravaged his home world before he and Eve escaped to Earth. They have aligned themselves with the insidious Narn K Corporation, a powerful bioengineering firm specializing in controversial experimentation and covert weapons development, and have been busy producing animal-human hybrids and synthetic soldiers for use in warfare and ultimately global invasion. Aside from the Narn K and the Crim, Horror and his crew have encountered everything from wish-granting demon lanterns and vampire street gangs to hillbilly swamp witches and robotic mobster hitmen.

The hallmark of the Eisner-Award nominated, Nocturnals: Black Planet miniseries is Brereton's moody, gothic style realized by hand painted art in every panel. The storytelling and visual imagery draws its influences from an eclectic mix of sources, including gangster films, science fiction, Lovecraftian creatures, and film noir. Brereton's supernatural art made a fan of rocker/filmmaker Rob Zombie, who tapped Brereton to paint an interior illustration for his multi-platinum Hellbilly Deluxe album. Zombie also wrote the introduction to Nocturnals: The Witching Hour one-shot.

The Nocturnals were seen in various appearances from 1994 through 2002. In 2003 "Nocturnals: A Midnight Companion" was published by Green Ronin as a sourcebook and guide, which won three gaming industry awards (ENnies) for that year. Olympian Publishing collected the first of two oversize hardcover volumes, followed by the second collected volume from Image Comics in 2009.

== Characters ==
=== Doc Horror ===
The main character of the series, leader of the Nocturnals and father to Eve, Doctor Nicodemus Horror first made himself known as "the Bogeyman", the feared Mafia "fixer" for Don Lupo Zampa in Pacific City. Within a year of his employment Horror managed to destroy the city's drug trade and eliminate all of Zampa's competitors, earning both a reputation as a top-notch enforcer and the ire of the Pacific City Police Department. Although he appears human, Doc Horror is actually a native of a parallel world referred to as the "Black Planet" that was overrun by the nefarious Crim following a great global war. Horror used his scientific genius to develop a technology that could open interdimensional gateways to other worlds in an effort to banish the Crim forever, but was betrayed by his government as part of their surrender and handed over to the traitor and Crim conspirator named Fane. Horror revealed the secrets of his technology under threat of Eve's life, but managed to push Eve into the open gateway and sending her here to Earth. After a struggle with Fane, Horror went through the gateway as well, apparently escaping his hellish world and leaving the Crim behind forever.

Once on Earth, Horror used his knowledge of advanced technology and the occult to gather resources to find Eve, travel the world, earn the loyalty of fellow paranormal outcasts, and eventually falling in with the Zampa crime family. Don Lupo's resources located the young Eve and reunited her with her father. This allowed them to make a home for themselves on Earth.

Horror requires regular treatments with a special medicine he developed to control "a rather nasty virus" he picked up on one of his expeditions. The nature of this disease is uncertain, as Horror will only say that if left untreated he would "hurt a lot of people", but an unused story panel found in the artist's notes in the back of the Black Planet compilation indicates that Horror is in fact a lycanthrope.

Doc Horror's preferred weapons are dual .45 caliber automatic pistols, which can be equipped with different types of ammunition he creates. In the final issue of the Black Planet miniseries, Doc Horror uses magically enhanced bullets that can send pieces of the target into other dimensions for a truly devastating effect. Aside from firearms, Horror carries a vast knowledge of arcane magic and advanced technology that aid him against supernatural enemies. Horror also appears to have a much stronger constitution than normal humans, taking bullets "like they were bee stings" and has no problem going toe-to-toe with vicious monsters and demons.

=== Halloween Girl ===
Doc Horror's daughter Evening, who prefers to be called Halloween Girl, is a precocious youth who perpetually seeks excitement. She carries with her a plastic pumpkinhead bucket filled with possessed toys that can grow to monstrous versions of themselves and talk to her from the spirit world. Doc Horror theorizes that Eve's toys became this way when she made the voyage from their native world to Earth; lost souls and wandering spirits looking for a friendly face and a listening ear found her in the transdimensional ether and offer their protection in return for someone to talk to.

Eve's propensity for getting into mischief is often the source of the Nocturnals' adventures. She once was captured by the Crim when she wandered into the Narn K subterranean Monster Shop, only to be rescued by Horror. She also once became a menu item for a hungry bat-witch on Halloween as well as a "victim" for a troublesome magic devil lantern, though often these would-be kidnappers find that Halloween Girl is far too much for them to handle. Even the most dire of situations appear to Eve as whimsical distractions, since very little on this world (or any other) can scare a girl who grew up around real live monsters.

=== Polychrome ===
Polychrome is a wraith, the spirit of a dead young woman who was destined to haunt this world for eternity. She was able to break free of this posthumous obligation and now resides with Doc Horror in the Tomb. Being a ghost, she has unspecified supernatural powers that include clairvoyance, the ability to heal wounds, and cast illusions, among others. Polychrome's otherworldly senses help Doc Horror maintain a close eye on enemies and individuals of interest, alert him to paranormal goings-on in Pacific City, and more importantly help him keep track of his trouble-magnet daughter. She acts as a maternal figure to the Horror crew and an older sister to Eve, as well as a pacifistic influence in a gang that has a tendency to draw pistols before asking questions. Polychrome has the ability to leave the Tomb and travel freely, with the exception of the regions underneath the Narn K headquarters known as the Monster Shop. Apparently during one of Doc Horror's earlier missions to rescue imprisoned animal-human hybrids he and Polychome discovered that nothing of an ectoplasmic nature can function in that area, almost leading to her total dissipation.

=== Firelion ===
Firelion

The Firelion is a massive blond-haired hulk that has the ability to conjure fierce fires, the result of Narn K experimention. He was once known as Phestus Gold, a police officer who had the misfortune of being the one in a million to die of spontaneous human combustion. His remains were appropriated by the Narn K scientists, who were able to put his brain into a fireproof synthetic body capable of harnessing his innate pyrotechnic abilities. He and others like him, known as "Burners", were deemed to be too dangerous for government use and scheduled for termination until he was rescued by Doc Horror. Firelion is now the last Burner alive, and he lives only to see the Narn K Corporation burn to the ground in retribution. Unlike other Nocturnals, Firelion prefers to use katana and wakizashi swords instead of firearms. When enraged, he becomes a fiery hellstorm of flames and blades. In his first appearance in the Black Planet miniseries, he lays waste to an entire building full of synthetic mob hitmen assigned to guard a captured Doc Horror. His reputation is such that even synthetics with no free will of their own show fear when they realize who he is.

=== Starfish ===
During one of Doc Horror's expeditions to Northern Europe, he came across a proto-human tadpole creature living in a peat bog. He brought it back to the Tomb and nursed it in a salt water tank, where it grew into the beautiful young amphibian Starfish. Starfish is one of Doc Horror's best gunfighters, and has become the object of the Raccoon's amorous affections. She has a feisty personality and does not suffer fools gladly, even going so far as to answer one of the Raccoon's cheeky remarks with a punch to the face. In spite of her professed revulsion to the hybrid gangster, she obviously conceals certain feelings for him and has even gone out with him on dates (during Halloween, of course, the one night of the year when they can blend in with everyone else). Being an amphibian, Starfish can exist freely in both dryland and aquatic environments. She has to maintain a high moisture content, however, and when fighting alongside Firelion his flames can be an uncomfortable annoyance.

=== The Raccoon ===
Procyon Cleanhands, also known as the Raccoon and the Bandit, is an escapee of the Narn K Monster Shop with enhanced strength, senses, and claws, and the personality of a dyed-in-the-wool gangster. He worked as a hired gun for the Zampa crime family before leading his own group called the Freelynchers and eventually joining up with Doc Horror and his crew. The Raccoon was once in league with Tony Zampa, Don Lupo's son and heir apparent, but was ousted in favor of an alliance with the Narn K. Zampa was inclined to betray and kill the Raccoon, who was a fugitive from Zampa's new business partners, but was killed himself when the Raccoon got the drop on him. The Raccoon was content to make his bid for power in the criminal syndicates, but when the Narn K rekindled their pursuit of him he could no longer maintain neutrality in their dealings. Although he claimed not to care about what happened to Doc Horror, his conscience lead him to join forces with him and help defeat the Narn K.

The Raccoon still likes to think of himself as being a free agent, but remains loyal to Horror. When Eve Horror was kidnapped by a bat-witch to be an ingredient in a stew on Halloween, the Raccoon helped Starfish and the Gunwitch rescue her. The Raccoon tried to appear offended that Eve didn't thank him properly for the assistance, but was quickly silenced when she told him that she could tell he had been helping himself to her trick-or-treat candy.

=== Komodo ===
Komodo, also called the Dragon Boy, is a young animal-human hybrid created by the Narn K Corporation's Monster Shop. Inspired by the legend of how the Raccoon was able to escape to a real life on the outside, he made two attempts to break out. The first time he tried to fly over the wall, but when he was recaptured they punished him by cutting off his wings. The second time he tried to go through the sewer, but the map he was given by a rat-hybrid named Chatter was meant to slow him down. He was about to be recaptured yet again by Narn K synthetic soldiers, but the timely arrival of the Gunwitch allowed him to evade them. The Gunwitch brought him back to the Tomb, where he made quick friends with the other Nocturnals and accepted their offer to join them. Komodo is an idealistic reptile-human who appears to be the equivalent of a teenager or young adult, though his actual age in years is impossible to determine. He has reptilian claws and fangs as well as night vision, and is stronger and more durable than normal humans. His physical stamina is strong enough to necessitate a Narn K soldier use an entire clip of tranquilizer darts in order to bring him down. He idolizes the Raccoon as a legend for his escape, despite the Raccoon's discomfort of this status, and seeks to liberate his imprisoned brethren from the Narn K Monster Shop at any cost.

=== Gunwitch ===
Described as equal parts scarecrow and zombie gunslinger, the Gunwitch is a silent undead golem with unerring marksmanship. Doc Horror made him as a babysitter and bodyguard for his daughter Eve, though the details of how he was made exactly have yet to be revealed. He only responds to commands in an occult language that is never given a name, and once he has a mission nothing can sway him. He serves as brute force and unmatched firepower within the Nocturnals, and has quickly become a fan favorite. Being a corpse, Gunwitch can take an unspecified amount of damage with no ill effects; one of the few times when he is affected by an enemy attack is when Eve is kidnapped in Nocturnals: The Witching Hour. Tiny forest sprites dust him with a magic powder that puts him to sleep, and when he is revived by Starfish and the Raccoon he appears to have taken it personally, much to the chagrin of those he discovers kidnapped Eve. He is the main character in his own miniseries called The Gunwitch: Outskirts of Doom, where he and Eve come upon a town that is torn between warring vampire gangs vying for control.

== Enemies ==
=== The Crim ===
The Crim are an extradimensional species of parasites that have overrun Doc Horror's native world and have arrived here on Earth. They resemble red octopuses and squid, and some have wings and various tendrils in all shapes in sizes. They are intelligent, and they have the ability to secrete a chemical through their bite that allows them to exert control over a person. The amount of control that a Crim can force over a host depends on the individual's constitution: Tony Zampa was influenced by a Crim hatchling, but it appears that Tony was unaware of its presence and its level of control over him may have been more subtle than a direct form of mind-control. Don Lupo, on the other hand, was reduced to a zombified puppet because of his frail health and advanced age. Separation from the Crim beast will immediately free the host of its influence. The Crim are, in Doc Horror's words, "a nasty breed. Difficult to kill". After discovering the Crim's presence on this world, Doc Horror worked on developing special pistol rounds that could affect the creatures: rather than simply inflict impact damage, they used his transdimensional technology to blow pieces of the target back to Horror's black planet. During the raid to rescue Holloween Girl and Komodo in the Black Planet finale, these rounds prove to be especially effective in dealing with the monsters.

=== Mr. Fane ===
The man known only as Fane is the Narn K/Crim liaison and archenemy of Doc Horror. He is in charge of the Narn K's bizarre and disturbing experiments in the dark recesses of the Monster Shop, and endlessly seeks to end the lives of Horror and his cohorts. Although he appears to be human, he is in fact native to the same blackened planet as Horror. It was Fane who helped betray Horror to the Crim following the loss of the war on their homeworld, and as such the good Doctor has nothing but contempt for what he calls the "traitor-bureaucrat". Fane managed to follow Doc Horror to Earth through the transdimensional gateway, quietly using the contacts he acquired within the Narn K to establish a Crim stronghold and slowly spread their influence. He used a Crim beast to subtly influence Tony Zampa, and after Zampa was killed he attempted to use Don Lupo in order to get to Horror. After the Nocturnals rescued Zampa and stormed the Monster Shop, Fane revealed his true form and attacked. Apparently his exposure to the Crim had made him into a Crim-like monster himself, forcing him to hide his true nature behind a weakling facade in order to pass as human on Earth. Despite his monstrous strength, Horror was able to defeat him with his magic bullets and let the newly freed hybrids from the Monster Shop tear him to pieces.

=== Narn K Corporation ===
The Narn K is a shadowy conglomerate located in the outskirts of Pacific City. It is a weapons and defense contractor, researching occult sciences and developing strange technology for sale to the highest bidder. Its two main "products" are robotic soldiers, known as Synthetics, and "Hybrids", creatures created using human and animal DNA and raised within the Monster Shop located deep below the Narn K grounds. They are in league with the parasitic Crim, but it is unknown just how far back these two sinister groups go. The leader of the Narn K is a woman named Fletcher, an unseen overseer who somehow has access to unnatural technology and scientific knowledge used in the production of the Narn K abominations. The Raccoon, Firelion, and Komodo are all the results of Narn K experimentation, and would like to see nothing more than the utter destruction of the evil corporation. The Nocturnals regularly stage raids on the Narn K headquarters, freeing Hybrids and sabotaging the inner workings of the Monster Shop. The animosity between the Nocturnals and the Narn K could only be described as unrelenting.

=== Anthony Zampa Faction ===
Although Don Lupo Zampa is a great friend and ally to Doc Horror and the Nocturnals, his son Tony hates them with a passion. In the beginning of Black Planet, Tony uses Zampa gangsters loyal to him in order to capture Doc Horror and uses him as a peace offering for a new partnership with the Narn K. Although Tony had established his own power base within the syndicate, many of his underbosses resented his departure from the family traditions and stood by as the Raccoon exacted revenge for his betrayal. Following Tony's death, his underlings discontinued any hostility towards the Nocturnals.

=== Synthetics ===
Synthetics are robotic foot soldiers produced by the Narn K. They are identical to humans except for their unnatural-looking skin, and appear to have at least a similacrum of (if not actual) personality and emotion. They do not have the ability to make their own choices however, and are subject to be loyal to whomever they are programmed to serve. Although they are mostly competent, they don't stand a chance against the Nocturnals during a fight.

== Supporting characters ==
=== Don Lupo Zampa ===
Don Lupo, "Papa Wolf", is the undisputed head of organized crime in Pacific City. He owes his status to Doc Horror, who single-handedly demolished both the illicit drug trade and the Zampa family competitors within the city in less than a year. Though a mobster in every respect, he is an amicable old fellow who does not tolerate what he calls "junkie behavior" and appears to be very loyal to friends and family. It was Don Lupo who helps locate Doc Horror's daughter Eve after they were separated on their journey to Earth, and even after Horror left his employment they have maintained a loyal friendship. Seeking to capitalize on this friendship, the Nark K corporation sought a business partnership with Don Lupo's son Tony, heir apparent to the Zampa family, but the deal was soon broken by Tony's death at the Raccoon's hands. They then tried to control Don Lupo with the hypnotic abilities of a Crim hatchling, but Doc Horror overcomes the trap and rescues Lupo before heading off for the final showdown with Fane and the Crim invaders.

=== Anthony Zampa ===
Tony Zampa is the prince of the Zampa crime family. His ultimate goal is the attainment of even greater power and fortune than was managed by his father, Don Lupo, and is willing to do whatever it takes to achieve this goal. He has always had a hatred for Doc Horror and the relationship he had with his father, and would have liked nothing more than to see Horror dead on the floor. He betrays his original business partner, the Raccoon, in favor of a partnership with the shadowy Narn K corporation, but ends up dead when the Raccoon comes to confront Tony. When pistols were drawn, Tony found his weapon empty; the other underbosses rejected Tony's abandonment of the traditional family ways and distrusted the Narn K, so they let the Raccoon take his revenge and take the rackets that were initially promised to him. Unbeknownst to Tony, however, he was in fact being subtly controlled by the Narn K corporation by use of a Crim creature attached to his body. The Crim was able to influence him towards their favor, and apparently even Tony was unaware that he was being manipulated. When he was exhumed by Doc Horror, the bite of the Crim beast actually brought Tony back into a form of temporary half-life that allowed him to have one last conversation with his old rival. Before he dies again for good, Tony simply asks Horror to make sure nobody hurts his father.

=== Detectives Willeford and Goodis ===
Detectives Willeford and Goodis are two Pacific City police officers who come across the conflict between the Nocturnals and the Narn K during their investigation of the Zampa criminal syndicate. During a stakeout they actually witness the emergence of Crim and the vicious gunfight involving Doc Horror, several Narn K synthetics, the Gunwitch, and a monstrous Fane. Afterwards, when they debate whether or not to tell anybody about the incredible things they saw, the Nocturnals appear and subtly convince them that some things are better left in the dark. Despite not having a clue as to what is really happening in Pacific City's darkest corners, the two detectives continue to search for the truth behind Doc Horror and his inhuman crew.

=== Lica ===
Lica is one of Zampa's secretaries. She "interviews" Doc Horror for his insights into "the criminal mind" before he is rescued by his crew, candidly indulges Detectives Goodis and Willeford when they investigate the Zampa family, and even goes on a date with the Raccoon. Her presence throughout the story is not particularly clear until the end, when she is revealed to be a Crim working for the Narn K. The Raccoon thanks his lucky stars that he never ended up sleeping with her when he sees her true form. Ultimately she is destroyed with the rest of the Crim when the Nocturnals show up in the Monster Shop tunnels and lay waste to Fane and his minions.

== Collected editions ==
The various stories have been collected in a number of volumes:

- Nocturnals (softcover, Oni Press):
  - Volume 1: Black Planet (collects The Black Planet limited series, 184 pages, December 1998, ISBN 0-9667127-0-6)
  - Volume 2: Dark Forever (collects The Dark Forever mini-series, 96 pages, June 2002, ISBN 1-929998-23-6)
  - Volume 3: Unhallowed Eve (collects Witching Hour from Dark Horse Presents #125–127 and "Troll Bridge" one-shot, 96 pages, October 2002, ISBN 1-929998-43-0)
- Gunwitch: Outskirts of Doom (collects Gunwitch: Outskirts of Doom mini-series, 104 pages, softcover, Oni Press, April 2002, ISBN 1-929998-22-8)
- Nocturnals Archives (hardcover:
  - Volume 1: Black Planet & Other Tales (collects The Black Planet limited series and Witching Hour from Dark Horse Presents #125–127, 256 pages, Olympian Publishing, November 2006, ISBN 0-9786326-2-1)
  - Volume 2: Dark Forever & Other Tales (collects mini-series The Dark Forever and Gunwitch: Outskirts of Doom, one-shot "Troll Bridge", and the stories "Spectres" and "Beasts", 280 pages, Image Comics, May 2009, ISBN 1-60706-065-5)

== Other media ==
=== Role-playing game ===
Nocturnals: A Midnight Companion is a sourcebook to integrate the characters with Mutants & Masterminds (Green Ronin Publishing, May 2004, ISBN 1-932442-02-2).

== Awards and nominations ==
The Nocturnals: Black Planet was nominated in the category of Best Painter at the 1995 Eisner Awards.

Nocturnals: A Midnight Companion sourcebook and guide (Green Ronin) won three Gaming Industry awards (ENnies) for 2003.
