= Dan Brereton =

American writer and illustrator

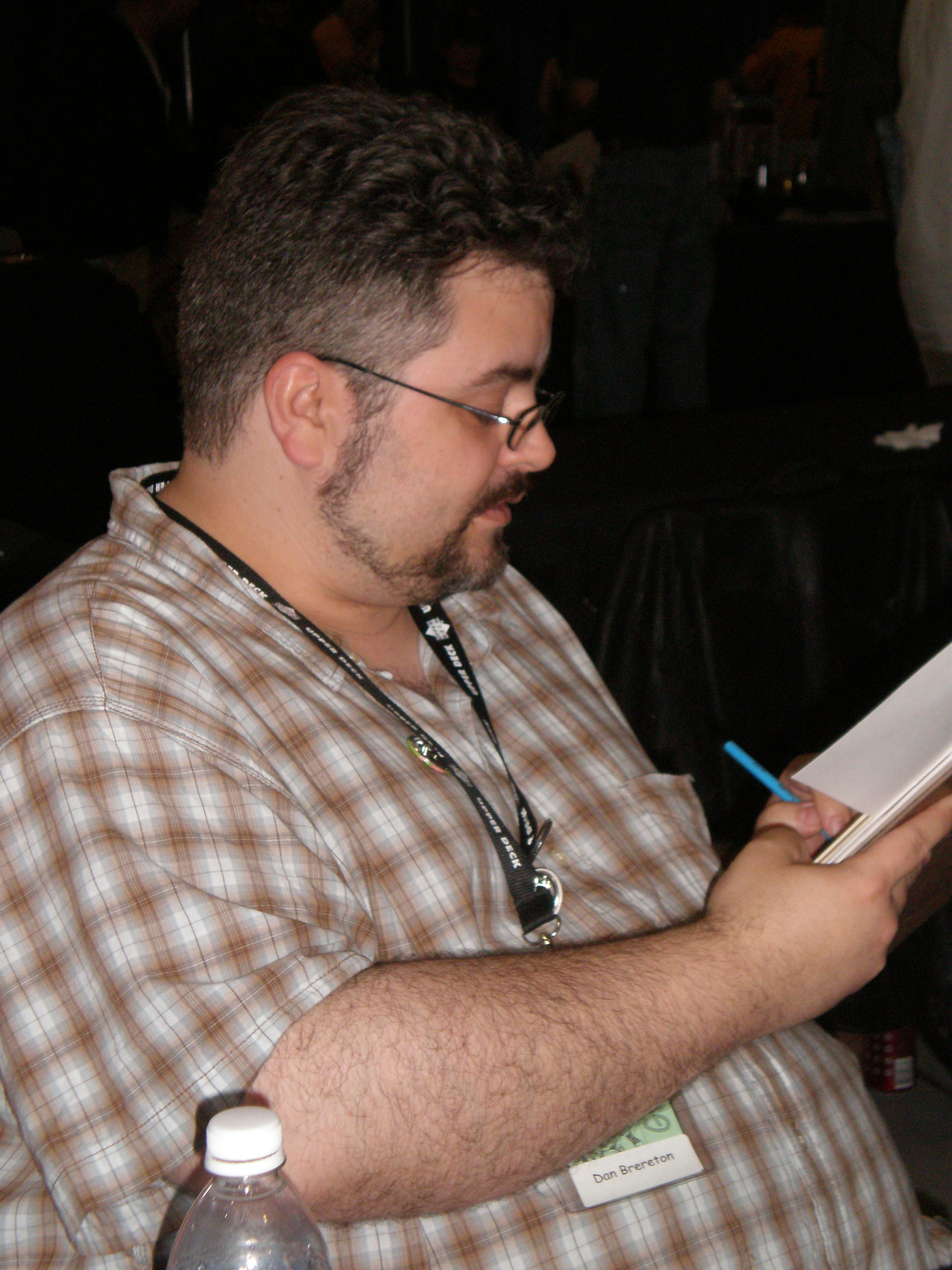

Daniel Alan Brereton (born November 22, San Francisco Bay Area) is an American writer and illustrator who has produced notable work in the comic book field.

== Biography ==
=== Early life ===
Dan Brereton attended the California College of the Arts and the Academy of Art College. He stated in a 2014 interview that "One of earliest memories of drawing monsters is from kindergarten. Our teacher asked us one afternoon what we wanted to do with the hour we had left in class and I yelled out, 'Let’s draw monsters!'...So to my mind, anyway, monsters are the purest product of our imaginations, whether they be good or bad or just plain wild. That idea never ceases to inspire me and find its way into my work."

=== Career ===
==== Comic books ====
He is known for his skills as a painter and his distinctive character designs. His first published work in the comics industry was the story "Lost Causes Chapter 1" in Merchants of Death #1 (July 1988) published by Eclipse Comics and he painted the Black Terror limited series in 1989–1990. Brereton gained further attention for his work on Batman: Thrillkiller, Superman and Batman: Legends of the World's Finest, Giantkiller, and JLA: Seven Caskets, His most famous work is his own series The Nocturnals.

Image Comics published Dan Brereton: The Goddess & The Monster, a collection of his work, in August 2010. Brereton wrote and drew a Batman story for DC Comics' digital first anthology series Legends of the Dark Knight in December 2015.

==== Other work ====
Outside the comic book field, Brereton's work includes the package illustration for a video game called "Machine Head," billboard and advertising art for Rawhide (a Wild West park in Scottsdale, Arizona), concept art for Pressman Films, the television show Numb3rs, development for Walt Disney Television Animation and album covers for the bands Toto, Fireball Ministry, Sote, Ghoultown, and Rob Zombie's Hellbilly Deluxe.

== Awards and nominations ==
- 1990: Won "Russ Manning Most Promising Newcomer Award" Eisner Award
- 1991: Nominated for "Best Artist" Eisner Award
- 1996: Nominated for "Best Painter" Eisner Award for Nocturnals:Black Planet
- 1997: Nominated for "Best Painter" Eisner Award, for Batman: Thrillkiller

== Bibliography ==
As artist unless noted:

- Merchants of Death #1–2 (Eclipse Comics) 1988
- The Black Terror #1–3 (Eclipse Comics) 1989–1990
- Clive Barker's Book of the Damned: A Hellraiser Companion (Epic Comics) 1991
- The Psycho #1–3 (artist/co-creator, DC Comics) 1991
- Interface #8 (one page, Epic Comics) 1991
- Clive Barker's Dread (Eclipse Comics) 1992
- That Chemical Reflex (CFD Productions) 1992
- Legends of the World's Finest #1–3 (DC Comics) 1993
- The Nocturnals: Black Planet #1–6 (writer/illustrator, Bravura/Malibu Comics, TPB: Oni Press) 1995
- Batgirl and Robin: Thrillkiller #1–3 (artist/co-creator, TPB, DC Comics) 1997
- Dark Horse Presents #125–127 (Dark Horse Comics) 1997
- Batgirl and Batman: Thrillkiller '62 #1 (artist/co-creator, TPB, DC Comics) 1998
- Nocturnals: Witching Hour #1 (writer/illustrator, Dark Horse Comics) 1998
- Superman: Silver Banshee #1–2 (writer/cover artist, DC Comics) 1998
- Batman: Legends of the Dark Knight #114 (DC Comics) 1998
- Buffy the Vampire Slayer: The Dust Waltz (writer, TPB, Dark Horse Comics) 1999
- Buffy the Vampire Slayer: The Origin (co-writer, TPB, Dark Horse Comics) 1999
- Giantkiller #1–6 (writer/illustrator, DC Comics, TPB Image) 1999–2000
- Giantkiller A to Z: A Field Guide to Big Monsters #1 (writer/illustrator, DC Comics, TPB Image) 1999
- Nocturnals: Troll Bridge (writer/illustrator, one-shot, Oni Press) 2000
- JLA: Seven Caskets (writer/illustrator, one-shot, DC Comics) 2000
- Nocturnals: The Dark Forever (writer/illustrator Oni Press) 2001
- The Gunwitch: Outskirts of Doom (writer, creator, co-cover artist Oni Press) 2001
- Ultimate Spider-Man Super Special #1 (Marvel Comics) 2002
- Bart Simpson's Treehouse of Horror #9 (Bongo Comics) 2003
- The Nocturnals: A Midnight Companion (writer/artist Green Ronin) 2004
- The Escapist #2, Luna Moth Story (Dark Horse Comics) 2004
- L'Ultima Battaglia a.k.a. The Last Battle (Buena Vista Lab, Disney Worldwide Publishing) 2005
- The Simpsons Super Spectacular #2, "Bongos" (Bongo Comics) 2006
- Drop-Dead Girl & Other Drawings (Big Wow Publishing) 2006
- The Immortal Iron Fist Annual #1 (cover art, interior art with various artists, Marvel Comics) 2007
- The Nocturnals: Black Planet and Other Stories Volume I (hardcover collection Olympian Publishing) 2007
- The Nocturnals: Carnival of Beasts (writer/artist with various Image Comics) 2008
- Vampirella Quarterly: Halloween Special (writer, cover artist Harris Publications) 2008
- Thor: God-Size (Marvel Comics) 2008
- The Anchor #3 (cover artist variant Boom! Studios) 2009
- Secret Invasion Aftermath Beta Ray Bill: The Green of Eden (Marvel Comics) 2009
- Immortal Weapons #2 (Marvel Comics) 2009
- The Nocturnals: Dark Forever & Other Tales Volume II (hardcover collection Image Comics) 2009
- The Punisher vol. 8 #14 (interior art Marvel Comics) 2010
- Red Sonja Annual #3 (writer, cover artist and select interior art Dynamite Entertainment) 2010
- Claw and Fang #1 (cover artist Blue Water Comics) 2010
- Dracula: The Company Of Monsters #1 (cover artist Boom! Studios) 2010
- Red Sonja: Deluge (writer, cover artist Dynamite Entertainment) 2010
- Franken-Castle #21 (cover artist, interior art Marvel Comics) 2010
- Vampirella: The Red Room #1–4 (writer, cover artist Dynamite Entertainment) 2012
- Marvel #2 (writer, interior art Marvel Comics) 2021

Preceded by Richard Piers Rayner	"Russ Manning Most Promising Newcomer Award"; Eisner Award recipient 1990	Succeeded by Dærick Gröss Sr.
