= Reddit API controversy =

2023 protests against charging for API

- Part of the controversies of Reddit
- An image posted on many subreddits as protest during the blackout
- Date: April 18 – July 21, 2023
- Type: Controversy
- Cause: Addition of charges for the Reddit API
- Participants: 7,000+ subreddits in blackout
- Outcome: Mass migration of subreddits to alternative platforms

The Reddit API controversy was a dispute between Reddit and portions of its user and developer communities following Reddit's April 2023 announcement that it would begin charging for access to its API, which had previously been free. The changes affected third-party applications and raised concerns about the continued availability of moderation tools and accessibility applications.

It continued in September 2026, when Reddit announced they would be closing their public API in November 2026, as well as shutting down their web feed (RSS).

== Background ==
Reddit is a news aggregation and discussion website. Posts are organized into "subreddits", individualized user-created boards moderated by users. In 2008, Reddit introduced its application programming interface (API), granting developers access to the site's corpus of posts and comments. Developers have used Reddit's free API to develop moderation tools and third-party applications; the API has also been used to train large language models (LLMs), including ChatGPT and Google's chatbot Gemini.

Subreddit moderators have previously coordinated large-scale protests in response to Reddit's decisions. In 2015, users protested the dismissal of a key employee involved in AMA sessions. and in 2021, another blackout occurred following controversy over a staff hiring.

== API changes ==
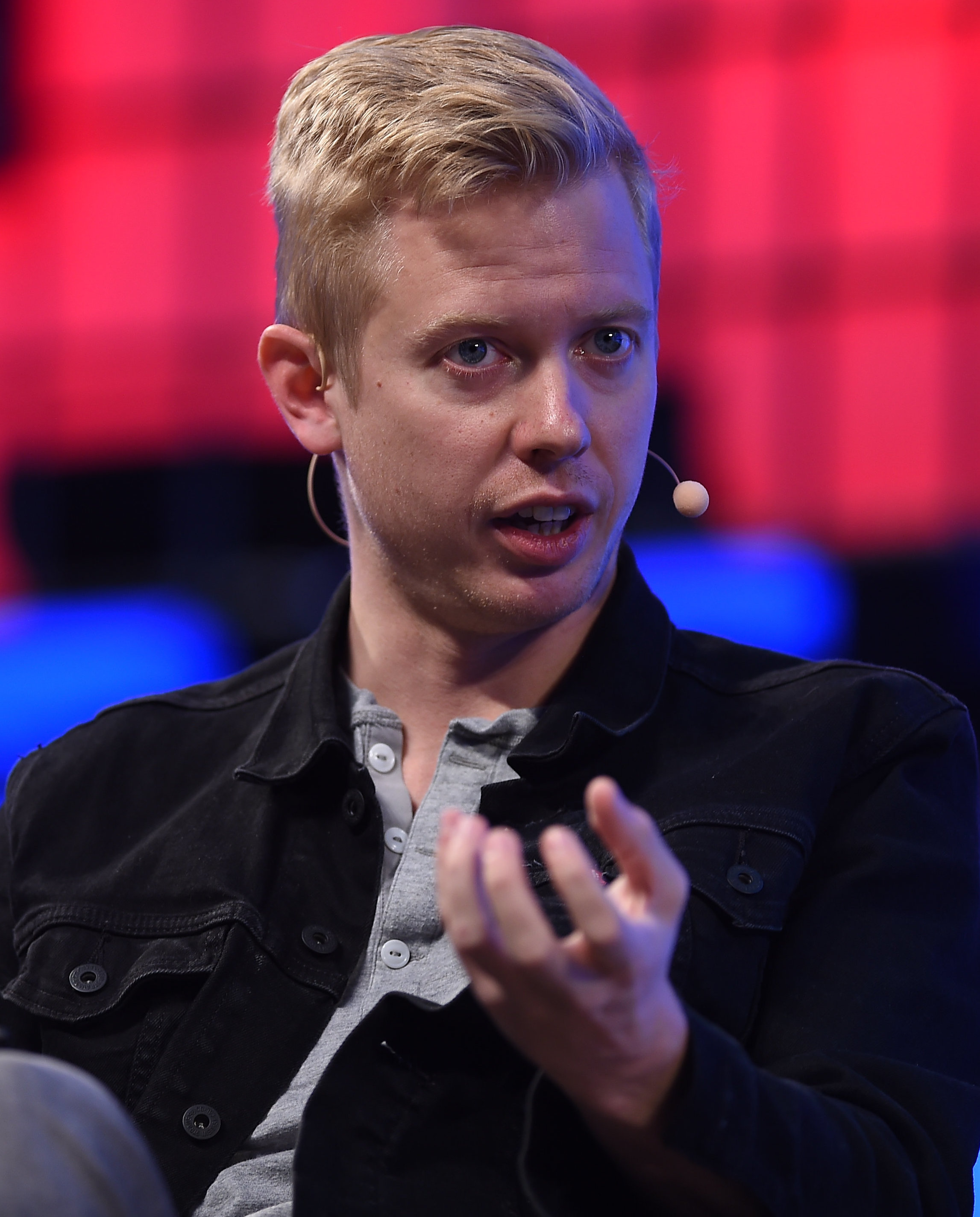
Steve Huffman, Reddit's CEO

On April 18, 2023, Reddit announced it would charge for its API service amid a potential initial public offering. Speaking to The New York Times' Mike Isaac, Reddit CEO Steve Huffman said, "The Reddit corpus of data is really valuable, but we don't need to give all of that value to some of the largest companies in the world for free". In spite of those changes, Huffman said that the API would continue to be available for free for developers who create moderation tools or researchers who use Reddit's data for academic purposes. Announcing the changes, Reddit stated that the Reddit data aggregation site Pushshift—whose service was used by LLMs—violated its API rules; the company also said it would restrict access to adult content.

Quoting their explanation of a previous protest that complained about how Reddit made major changes to the site without “any apparent care” to how it would affect moderators, the moderators of r/IAmA stated they would no longer solicit AMAs from notable figures. Because the third-party apps they previously used to moderate their subreddit would no longer work, and criticizing Reddit's lack of response on making the official app accessible, the moderators of r/Blind stated that they could no longer moderate on mobile.

=== Impact on third-party applications ===
On May 31, Christian Selig, the developer of the third-party Reddit client Apollo, said that he was quoted US$12,000 for 50 million requests and could be forced to pay US$20 million per year in order to continue to operate. Selig stated that he could not pay Reddit's pricing and was unsure of how to even charge it. Speaking to The Verge, he posed that Reddit's pricing could present an existential risk for Reddit clients such as Rif Is Fun for Reddit (RIF) and Relay.

On June 8, Selig announced that he would shut down Apollo on June 30. In a Reddit post, he alleged that Huffman told employees that Selig was blackmailing the company out of US$10 million; Selig provided audio recordings between himself and a Reddit employee disproving the claim. His announcement was accompanied by other similar statements, including from RIF developer Andrew Shu, who cited Reddit's "hostile treatment of developers building on their platform" and a high API cost. Other third-party Reddit apps, such as Sync for Reddit and ReddPlanet, have also announced that they will shut down.

Amid concerns that these applications could no longer work, Reddit responded by stating that it would give "non-commercial, accessibility-focused" apps an exception from their pricing terms. A moderator of r/Blind contended that they had received no clarification from Reddit about how it would be defining "accessibility-focused apps". Several third-party applications with extensive accessibility features were later confirmed to be given an exemption as "non-commercial accessibility-focused" applications. RedReader and Dystopia have received exemptions. Additionally, Huffman provided an exemption for "third-party moderation [tools]"; former Ars Technica writer and moderator of a ZFS subreddit Jim Salter wrote to the publication that he does not know of "anyone at all" using such a client.

On June 30, Reddit's proposed changes went into effect, shutting down some third-party Reddit clients, including Apollo, Sync, BaconReader and RIF. In spite of this, Narwhal, Relay and Now for Reddit turned to a subscription model to remain profitable.

=== Reddit's reactions ===
Huffman addressed several of the announced changes to the API service in an Ask Me Anything (AMA). Concerning the changes for third-party apps, he said Reddit could "no longer subsidize commercial entities that require large-scale data use." He went on to say that Reddit would work to make its mobile app more accessible. Although Huffman claimed Reddit was actively in communication with many third-party application developers to aid in their continued operation, some developers commented that Reddit had not responded to them in months.

Tim Rathschmidt, a spokesperson for Reddit, told The New York Times that Reddit was in contact with communities to "clarify any confusion around our Data API Terms, platform-wide policies, community support resources, and timing for new moderator tools." He added that Reddit "needs to be fairly paid to continue supporting high-usage third-party apps", noting that the new API pricing "is based on usage levels that we measure to be comparable to our own costs". Rathschmidt also stated that Reddit's hosting costs were in the multi-millions.

== Subreddit blackout ==
Full-size banner posted on many subreddits

On June 12, 2023, thousands of subreddits went private or restricted posting in protest of Reddit's API changes, including several of the platform's largest communities. The action caused widespread disruption across the site and contributed to temporary outages. While the initial protest was planned to last 48 hours, many subreddits extended or made their blackouts indefinite.

Reddit administrators urged communities to reopen and warned that moderators who kept subreddits private could be replaced. In response, some moderation teams reopened their communities, while others continued their protest.

== Other activities ==
=== Alternate forms of protest ===
In addition to blackouts, some subreddits adopted alternative forms of protest, including restricting content, allowing off-topic or humorous posts, or marking communities as not safe for work (NSFW) to disrupt advertising. Reddit administrators responded by removing or threatening to replace moderators who violated site policies, leading some communities to reopen while others continued their protest.

During the July 2023 iteration of r/place, users used the collaborative canvas to display protest messages targeting Reddit CEO Steve Huffman. Prominent slogans, including “Fuck spez” (referencing Huffman's username), were widely shared across the canvas. Some participants also created more graphic imagery, including a depiction of the Reddit mascot positioned beneath a guillotine bearing Huffman's name.

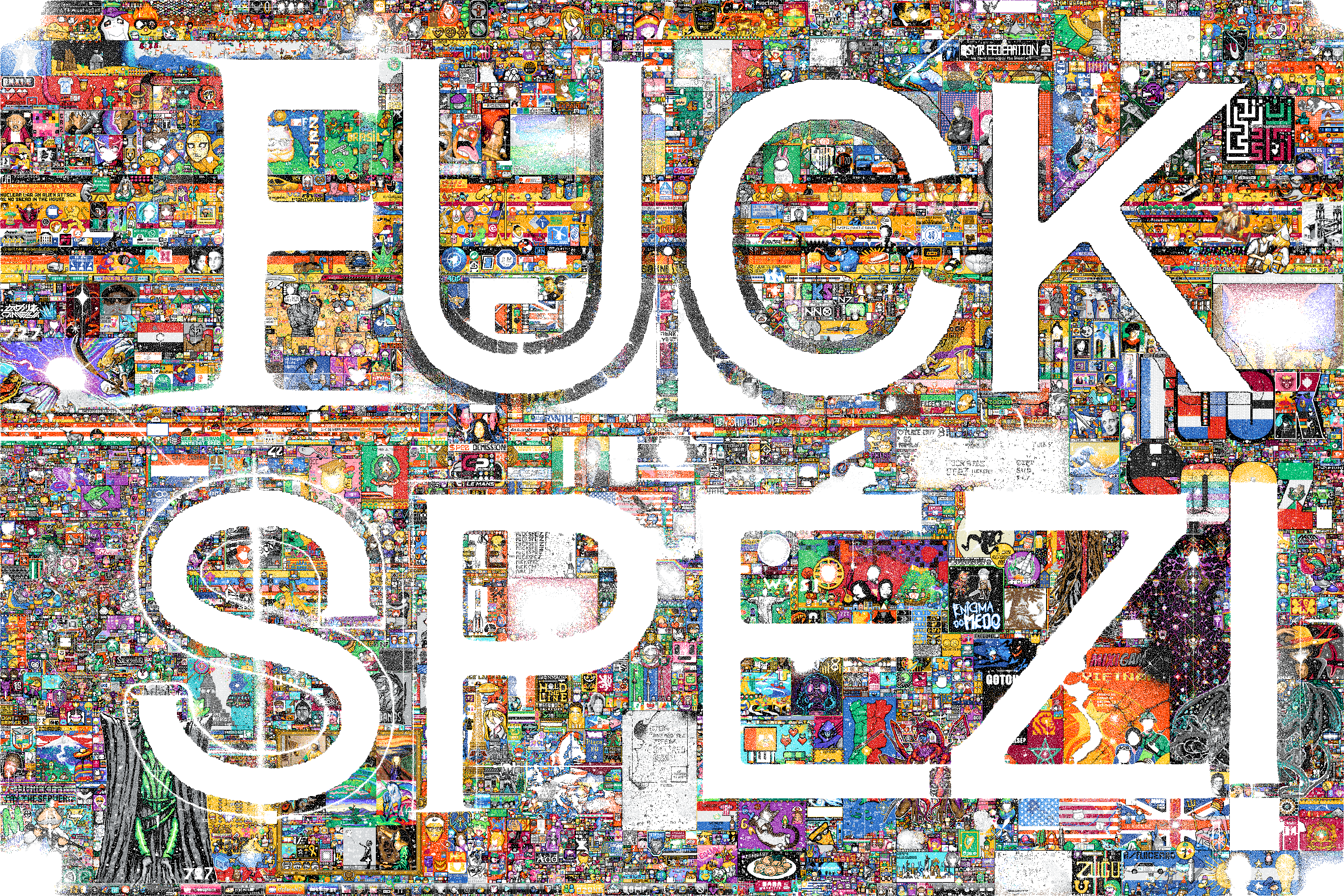
Users used r/place to voice their discontent with Reddit CEO Steve Huffman.

=== Data hack ===
The ransomware group BlackCat threatened to release 80 gigabytes of data if Reddit does not pay US$4.5 million and undo the API changes. Reddit had previously confirmed a security incident that took place in February which compromised "internal documents, code, and some internal business systems." A spokesperson confirmed that BlackCat is related to that February incident.

== Subreddit takeovers ==
On July 21, Reddit took over the subreddit r/malefashionadvice through an account named "ModCodeofConduct" amid pushes for the subreddit's community to move to Discord and Substack; ModCodeofConduct is the sole moderator of several other subreddits, including r/ShittyLifeProTips, r/AccidentalRenaissance, and r/oldbabies. Through the ModCodeofConduct account, Reddit administrators sought new moderators for these subreddits. A moderator for r/AccidentalRenaissance told Ars Technica that new moderators would find the task challenging, given that they would be subject to "the worst photos they could imagine", including child pornography, dying children and animals, and human feces. The moderator described how previous moderators of r/AccidentalRenaissance had "art history backgrounds, formal education, and an instinctual grasp of what makes a photo 'Renaissance.'", qualifications disregarded by Reddit; they further noted that the subreddit's contents "now [...] are simply 'Not Renaissance.'", and criticized Reddit's choice of moderators.

== Reactions ==
Reddit co-founder Alexis Ohanian tweeted, "Online community-building is more like IRL community-building than people realize", in an apparent reference to the backlash to Reddit's API changes.

On June 29, Mojang Studios, the developers of Minecraft, would cease posting game updates and official content onto Reddit, citing moderation and rule changes. Though owned by Microsoft under its Xbox division, the policy implemented by Minecraft developers did not extend to all Microsoft and Xbox brands. A Mojang representative noted that the company would reconsider if Reddit's API rules change.

=== Analysis ===
Columnist Megan McArdle compared Reddit to the nonprofit organization Goodwill and said that the site's moderators have "essentially gone on strike". The Verge reporter Jay Peters noted that the quality of Google Search results decreased, citing the lack of resources for The Legend of Zelda: Tears of the Kingdom (2023), among other grievances. John Herrman of Intelligencer made a similar comment. Casey Newton drew attention to a comment Huffman made praising Elon Musk for his tenure as Twitter's CEO; among Musk's decisions as CEO was to remove Twitter's free tier for its API. In an all-hands meeting, Google senior vice president Prabhakar Raghavan admitted users were "not quite happy" with Google's search results after the blackout.
