= Apollo (app) =

2017–2023 third-party Reddit client for iOS

- Other names: Apollo for Reddit
- Developer: Christian Selig
- Release: 23 October 2017; 8 years ago
- Final release: 1.15.17 / 28 November 2023; 2 years ago
- Written in: Swift and Objective-C
- Operating system: Final version; iOS 15 and later; iPadOS 15 and later; Original version; iOS 10 and later
- Platform: ARM
- Size: 124.9 MB
- Available in: English
- Type: Reddit client
- License: Proprietary
- Website: apolloapp.io

Apollo for Reddit, shortened to Apollo, was a third-party Reddit client for iOS. Developed by Canadian programmer Christian Selig, a former Apple intern, Apollo was designed as an iOS-friendly successor to Alien Blue, and an alternative to the official Reddit app. It was notable for its large feature set over the official app, including rapid support for newly-introduced iOS features such as Lock Screen widgets. It had a gesture-based design and featured no advertisements.

Launched on 23 October 2017 after an extensive beta period that began in early 2015, Apollo quickly became popular. Throughout its lifespan, it received critical praise and became one of the most popular third-party Reddit clients, with close to 5 million lifetime global installs by 2023. Selig would sometimes run fundraising initiatives within the app to raise money for causes such as animal shelters. However, following controversial Reddit API changes that made its continued operation untenable in Selig's view, Selig shut down the app on 30 June 2023.

== History ==
=== Background ===
In October 2014, Reddit acquired Alien Blue, the most popular iOS Reddit client, for an undisclosed sum, and made it the official Reddit app for iOS. However, in trying to rework it and develop a version for Android, the Reddit team found its dated infrastructure limiting. In April 2016, Alien Blue was discontinued and removed from the App Store in favour of a new, rewritten Reddit application. Alex Le, Reddit's vice president of product, called the new app a "modern interpretation of what Reddit should be on a mobile device".

=== Launch ===
After being tested in public beta since early 2015, Apollo officially launched on the App Store for iOS on 23 October 2017. Halifax-based developer Christian Selig, a former Apple intern, said in his Reddit introduction post that he saw the app as a suitable replacement for Alien Blue, and that the new official app, unlike Apollo, had not incorporated fan-favourite features from the "incredible" Alien Blue, such as inline previews for external media links. He also said he wanted to build a better replacement for the desktop website version of Reddit.

Selig later said that during this period, he was offered a job at Reddit by CEO Steve Huffman, but he declined the offer to continue working on Apollo.

=== Initiatives ===
Beginning in 2018, Selig ran an annual fundraiser on his birthday for the Nova Scotia Society for the Prevention of Cruelty, donating Apollo's proceeds for a day each year. The fundraiser raised over CA$5,000 in 2018.

In 2019, the fundraiser raised CA$27,355, almost tripling Selig's CA$10,000 goal, and went viral, hitting the front page of Reddit. In 2020, over CA$42,000 was raised, a record donation for the organisation.

=== Reddit API changes and shutdown ===
On 18 April 2023, Reddit announced it would begin to charge for access to its application programming interface (API), citing data scraping by LLMs as its primary reason. On 31 May, Selig announced that Apollo would cost US$20 million a year to run under the new terms, a financially untenable figure, but expressed hope for a more equitable offer allowing Apollo to keep running. However, talks soon turned "ugly", and he later announced that Apollo would shut down on 30 June due to the changes. He said other options such as making Apollo subscription-only were also unworkable, and refuted Reddit's claims that Apollo was more inefficient under the API than other third-party apps. The decision to limit access to "mature content" within Reddit's API also affected Apollo. The new terms came following similar changes by Twitter and preceded a rumoured initial public offering by Reddit.

Apollo shut down on 30 June, along with several other third-party Reddit apps. Selig thanked fans of the app and said he was "heartbroken". Premium tier subscribers received an automatic pro-rated refund for time remaining on their subscription, which they had the option to decline. Reddit users and moderators widely protested the platform's API changes; many subreddits went into "lockdown" to protest the changes, disallowing new posts indefinitely. Reddit denied trying to intentionally "kill" third-party apps. The Verge noted that Apollo became "the central figure in an all-out platform war".

== Features ==
Apollo was created to better follow established iOS human interface guidelines than competing Reddit clients. The app's global tab bar featured five main tabs: Posts, Inbox, Account, Search, and Settings. The app featured gestures for performing common tasks like replying and saving posts. The app was highly customisable, allowing a choice between large and compact post sizings, a dark mode, and modification of the app's gesture-based design. A "Jump Bar" feature allowed for rapid switching between different subreddits, and a media viewer allowed inline viewing of content from providers such as YouTube, Gfycat, and Imgur. Its text editor utilised Markdown. Comments from new Reddit accounts could be automatically highlighted to help users spot unconstructive users, and comments from the moderation bot AutoModerator could be automatically hidden. Comments were indented using different coloured lines (also customisable), improving visual focus.

The app received regular updates that added new features. Core components like media viewing and sharing options were improved over time. In December 2018, the ability to quick switch between Reddit accounts was added. In May 2022, a major update overhauled the app's push notification support, allowing for additional features like custom subreddit watchers, post reminders, and trending post notifications. Version 1.14 introduced in September 2022 brought support for Lock Screen widgets, a feature introduced in iOS 16. Trending posts and favourite subreddits could be pinned to the Lock Screen for easy access.

=== Monetisation ===
The app was free to download and featured no advertisements. An optional "Pro" tier was available as an in-app purchase and unlocked features geared towards power users such as post creation, multiple account support, and GIF scrubbing. Users on the "Pro" tier could also adjust the app's icon, choosing from a selection that was regularly updated. An "Ultra" subscription tier was later added to fund additional features like push notifications.

=== Pixel Pals ===
The iPhone 14 Pro and iPhone 14 Pro Max introduced a new user interface element called the Dynamic Island at the top of the screen in which notifications and other software elements can be displayed. In September 2022, Selig added a feature to Apollo called "Pixel Pals", a Tamagotchi-like virtual pet that would sit on top of the Dynamic Island as the user browsed Reddit. Multiple animals could be selected by the user, including a dog, cat, and hedgehog. The feature was also implemented as a Lock Screen widget for users on older iPhone models.

Pixel Pals was a popular feature; according to Selig, it made 40 percent of his revenue after its introduction to Apollo. It was later spun off into its own app, which received a major 2.0 update in September 2023 that introduced additional game elements. An update following Apollo's shutdown added the ability to transfer characters to the standalone app.

== Development ==
A majority of the app was written in Swift, with some elements written in Objective-C. The server components were written in Go. Selig recommended Swift to newcomers and called it an "absolute dream to program in".

Due to Selig's familiarity with Apple, the app was known for quickly supporting Apple's latest software APIs and technologies. It supported system features such as Safari View Controller, Taptic Engine, and 3D Touch. Selig wanted the app to feel like "a really great first class citizen of iOS".

=== Planned iPad and macOS versions ===
The Apollo app was a universal app that supported iPad from release, but with no special enhancements for the larger screen. Selig had plans to take the iPad version "to the next level", but this never materialised before the app's discontinuation.

== Reception ==
Lifehacker said the app was "so elegant Apple might have imagined it themselves" and called it the best Reddit app of 2022, praising added features over the official app like URL previews and GIF scrubbing. Vice called it the best Reddit app in 2023. Joe Rossignol of MacRumors called it "beautiful, modern, and fast" and called the media viewer "impressive".

Sarah Perez of TechCrunch called it "beautifully designed" and praised the "thoughtfulness" behind its design. She said that newcomers to Reddit would appreciate the app's ease-of-use and called the app a "labor of love". TechRadar praised its speed and "streamlined design" in comparison to the official app. Ryan Christoffel of MacStories praised its speed and use of iOS design elements, saying they would make the app feel "instantly familiar" to iOS users.

Apollo was featured by Apple several times in promotional material for iOS and its App Store, including during its WWDC 2022 and 2023 keynotes, the latter being less than a month prior to Apollo's shutdown. It also received an "editor's choice" badge on the App Store in January 2021.

=== Popularity ===
Apollo was one of the most popular third-party Reddit apps on iOS. In October 2021, Selig said that Apollo had "several hundred thousand users".

Selig said that the app had approximately 1.3 to 1.5 million monthly active users, 7 billion API requests per month, and about 900,000 daily active users at the time of its discontinuation. According to third-party estimates, Apollo had close to 5 million global installs.
