= Giant Killer (call sign) =

Military aviation call sign in the United States

GIANT KILLER is a military Air Traffic Control (ATC) call sign used within certain regions of the contiguous United States (CONUS). The callsign is primarily administered by the United States Navy for military flight operations on the East Coast.

The call sign is utilized by military air traffic controllers responsible for flight operations within restricted military airspace or to direct military air craft that is transiting civilian airspace. The call sign is commonly published in NOTAMs that designate restricted airspace reserved for military flight operations or combat exercises where normal airspace operating rules do not apply. Prior to the introduction of the call sign, standardized identification methods for military controllers holding operating authority over a specific section of airspace did not exist.

To reduce the confusion and to ensure standardized emergency communication procedures among the various branches of the U.S. military, the call sign GIANT KILLER is used to denote the controlling authority for a section of military airspace dedicated to combat training or combat operations within the U.S. In rare circumstances, call signs like GIANT KILLER may be used during a national emergency when a specific controller has been assigned a section of airspace. This was the case on September 11, 2001 when US Navy personnel utilized the call sign to vector three F-16s from Langley Air Force Base to the National Capital Region for air defense purposes. It is possible for a specific controller to utilize more than one call sign, with GIANT KILLER being one of them. For clarity, the name is always written in capital letters with a space between the words.

== Origins ==
The U.S. military commonly uses pairs of words that do not sound phonetically similar as call signs. This reduces the chance for confusion during transmission of critical messages. Most military air traffic control facilities that use the GIANT KILLER call sign maintain direct communications to weapons capable flight squadrons; the "killer" portion of the call sign may be more than a coincidence.

== Safety considerations for general aviation ==
A significant safety concern for military combat exercise planners is the possibility of a general aviation aircraft mistakenly entering restricted airspace while an active combat training exercise is underway. Added safety measures are taken when target drones are used during war games. During such times, it is not uncommon for the military to release a specific safety NOTAM via the Federal Aviation Administration. Such NOTAMs usually indicate that any aircraft in the vicinity of restricted airspace should contact GIANT KILLER on a specified frequency if a pilot becomes involved in a situation near the specified coordinates. Certain target drones have a radar signature that is comparable to many single engine aircraft commonly used within the General Aviation community. Use of a common call sign like GIANT KILLER reduces the time needed to clarify the origin of critical safety messages.
