= Jack the Giant Killer (2013 film) =

- Directed by: Mark Atkins
- Screenplay by: Mark Atkins
- Produced by: David Michael Latt; David Rimawi; Paul Bales
- Starring: Ben Cross; Jane March
- Cinematography: Mark Atkins
- Music by: Chris Ridenhour
- Production company: The Asylum
- Distributed by: The Asylum
- Release date: March 12, 2013
- Running time: 87 minutes
- Country: United States
- Language: English

Jack the Giant Killer is a 2013 American fantasy film produced by The Asylum and directed by Mark Atkins. A modern take of the fairy tales "Jack the Giant Killer" and "Jack and the Beanstalk", the film stars Ben Cross and Jane March. It is a mockbuster of Jack the Giant Slayer. It was released on DVD in the UK as The Giant Killer.

== Plot ==
A man who appears crazy shows up at Jack's eighteenth birthday party claiming to have a gift from Jack's missing father, Newald Krutchens. The stranger, Jess Walters, tells Jack that he never forgets a promise. Jack's mother, Sharon, believes Jess is "clinically insane" and wants Jack to forget about the ordeal. After opening the gift and discovering it contains only beans, Jack tosses them into an empty field.

Discovering the beanstalk the next morning, Jack is trapped by a bean tendril and carried up into the clouds to find a strange land. He is chased by a dinosaur-like monster and takes refuge in a nearby floating mechanical castle, which is revealed to be operated by his father. For Jack, his father has been missing since birth, but Newald swears he has only been gone a few days. He is surprised that his son is now full-grown but accepts that it must be true. He further deduces that the following must be true: one day in this land is equivalent to one year on Earth. Newald is still only twenty-nine. Jack explains to his father that Jess gave him the beans, and Newald fondly recalls that his friend never forgets a promise. Jack then suggests they go back down the beanstalk together, but Newald points out that "only he who plants the bean can travel the stalk".

Jack and his father explore the Land of the Clouds and visit the mysterious sorceress Selina in hope of finding a solution to their problem. Newald confronts Selina as she is taking a bath in the middle of an empty room. Meanwhile, Jack's girlfriend Lisa plants another beanstalk to rescue Jack, but Selina uses this beanstalk to take the beasts down to Earth so she can become its ruler. It is eventually revealed that Selina's mother, Mildred, became a local legend for claiming her daughter was stolen by giants. Selina is coming to Earth to find her.

The British Army steps in (dressed in the uniforms of World War II soldiers). They declare the beanstalk as a public menace, but their military weapons - including rifles, tranquilizer bullets and rubber bullets - are ineffective against the beasts. Lisa, Newald and Jack drive the floating castle off the edge of the world and Newald admits that he has no idea what is going to happen. Luckily, the castle seems to be holding up quite well. The castle spins off the edge of the world and they land safely on a creature. General O'Shauncey has seen many things in his army career, but he exclaims that this "takes the biscuit". Meanwhile, Jess pretends to be the prime minister.

Newald nabs Selina's necklace as he believes it will stop her control over the giants. He cites the law that "they will become peaceful beasts of the fields". Unfortunately, the giants do not become peaceful beasts of the fields and become evil, attacking everyone in sight. Newald takes Selina into a car and introduces her to his friends. The driver is squashed by a giant.

The British Army defeats most of the monsters but one remains. Jess sacrifices himself to distract the beast with his motorcycle, and is tragically squashed underfoot. Jack saves the day in a mechanical metal suit and Selina hugs Newald, undecided about her plans for retribution.

== Cast ==
- Ben Cross as Agent Hinton
- Jane March as Serena, a mysterious woman who was abducted by giants as a baby and taken to the Land of the Clouds. While the picture of her mother seems to date back to the Victorian Era, according to the law of the Land of the Clouds (where one day there equals one year on Earth), she should be several thousand years old.
- Jamie Atkins as Jack Krutchens, a young boy who is given some beans.
- Vicki Glover as Lisa Russell, Jack's girlfriend.
- Harry Dyer as Newald Krutchens, Jack's father who has been trapped in the Land of the Clouds for nineteen days (but nineteen years in Earth time). Only twenty-nine years old, he is a genius who experimented with agriculture and developed the magic beans.
- Tanya Winsor as Sharon Mason, Jack's mother.
- Julian Boote as Nigel Mason, Jack's stepfather.
- Jon Campling as Jess Walters, a strange man who appears to be crazy. He never forgets a promise. He was the unofficial Prime Minister of the United Kingdom for a brief time.
- Steve McTigue as General O'Shauncey, a decorated army man. Whether he participated in the War of 1812 or simply recalls the tactics used by the British is unclear.
- Robert Boyle as Sergeant Jones
- Noel Ross as Constable Milton
- Nigel Peever as Oscar Madison

== Release ==
The film was released direct-to-video and on video-on-demand on March 12, 2013. In the tradition of The Asylum's catalog, Jack the Giant Killer is a mockbuster of the New Line Cinema/Legendary Pictures film Jack the Giant Slayer.

== Reception ==
Influx Magazine rated it "D" and called it "pretty bad". Moira gave the movie one star, finding the movie to have a good premise and that the first half has some promise, but that the last part of the movie fails to live up to this.
