= Giantkiller =

- Yochu the Giantkiller lifts up the head of a defeated giant monster, from Giantkiller #3.

Publication information
- Publisher: DC Comics
- Format: Limited series
- Main character(s): Jack/"Yochu"; Jill Sleet; Dr. Azuma

Creative team
- Created by: Dan Brereton
- Written by: Dan Brereton
- Artist(s): Dan Brereton
- Letterer(s): Bill Oakley

Giantkiller is a limited comic-book series created by Dan Brereton and published by DC Comics. The series ran 6 issues and spawned a one shot handbook called Giantkiller A to Z: A Field Guide to Big Monsters. The series has since been collected in a trade-paperback format by Image Comics.

== Plot ==
The story takes place in San Francisco, California in the wake of a mysterious eruption in which giants of an unknown origin wreak havoc on the earth. The U.S. military is powerless against the monsters whose physiology defies all conventional weaponry. The military then responds with the aid of Dr. Azuma, a bio-engineer, to create a genetic hybrid to combat the giant monsters.

Nicknamed "Yochu" by Dr. Azuma and known to the military under the operational name "Jack the Giant Killer", humanity's only hope lies in the nine-foot super-being with a bio-engineered arsenal and a samurai katana forged from the fang of one of the behemoths. With a little help from the outlaw Jill Sleet, the only human capable of surviving the poisonous territories of the giants, Jack must learn to overcome or embrace his monstrous nature in order to determine the destiny of mankind.
