= Steve Huffman =

American web developer and entrepreneur (born 1983)

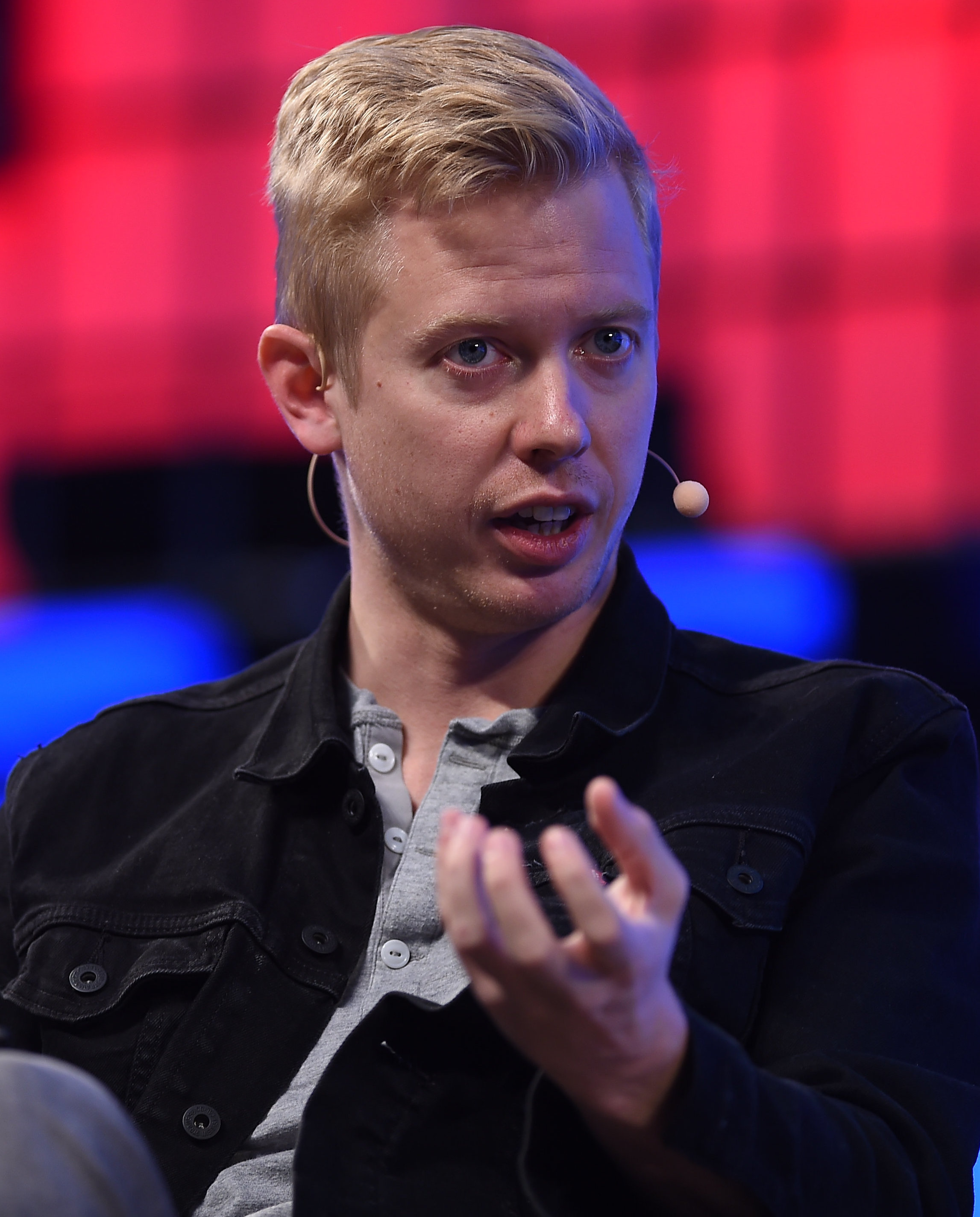
- Huffman in 2017
- Born: Steve Huffman November 12, 1983 (age 43); Lansing, Michigan, U.S.
- Other name: spez
- Education: University of Virginia (BS)
- Occupations: Co-founder and CEO of Reddit
- Children: 1

Steve Huffman (born November 12, 1983), also known by his Reddit username spez (/spɛz/), is an American web developer and entrepreneur. He is the co-founder and CEO of Reddit, which is the ninth most-visited website in the world as of November 2026. He also co-founded the airfare search engine website Hipmunk, which was shut down in 2020. His tenure as Reddit CEO has been met with many controversies regarding his changes to the platform. As of November 2025, Huffman's estimated net worth is approximately $1.2 billion.

== Early life and education ==
Steve Huffman grew up in Warrenton, Virginia. He began programming at age 8. He graduated in 2001 from Wakefield School in The Plains, Virginia. At the University of Virginia (UVA), he studied computer science, graduating in 2005.

== Career ==
During spring break of his senior year at UVA, Huffman and college roommate Alexis Ohanian drove to Boston, Massachusetts, to attend a lecture delivered by English programmer-entrepreneur Paul Graham. Huffman and Ohanian talked with Graham after the lecture and he invited them to apply to Y Combinator, his start-up incubator. Huffman came up with their original idea, My Mobile Menu, which was intended to allow users to order food by SMS. The idea was rejected, but Graham asked Huffman and Ohanian to meet him in Boston to pitch another idea for a start-up; it was at this brainstorming session that the idea for what Graham called the "front page of the Internet" was created. Huffman and Ohanian were accepted in Y Combinator's first class. Huffman programmed the entire site in Lisp. He and Ohanian launched Reddit in June 2005, funded by Y Combinator

The site's audience grew rapidly in its first few months, and by August 2005, Huffman noticed their habitual user-base had grown so large that he no longer needed to fill the front page with content himself. Huffman and Ohanian sold Reddit to Condé Nast on October 31, 2006, for a reported $10 million to $20 million. Huffman remained with Reddit until 2009, when he left his role as acting CEO.

Huffman spent several months backpacking in Costa Rica before co-creating the travel website Hipmunk with Adam Goldstein, an author and software developer, in 2010. Funded by Y Combinator, Hipmunk launched in August 2010 with Huffman as CTO. In 2011, Inc. named Huffman to its 30 under 30 list.

In 2014, Huffman said that his decision to sell Reddit had been a mistake, and that the site's growth had exceeded his expectations. On July 10, 2015, Reddit hired Huffman as CEO following the resignation of Ellen Pao and during a particularly difficult time for the company. Upon re-joining the company, Huffman's top goals included launching Reddit's iOS and Android apps, fixing Reddit's mobile website, and creating A/B testing infrastructure.

Since returning to Reddit, Huffman instituted a number of technological changes including an updated mobile site and stronger infrastructure, as well as new content guidelines. These included a ban on content that incites violence, quarantining some material users might find offensive, and removing communities "that exist solely to... make Reddit worse for everyone else". Shortly after returning, Huffman wrote that "neither Alexis nor I created Reddit to be a bastion of free speech, but rather as a place where open and honest discussion can happen." In a 2012 interview, Alexis Ohanian had used the phrase "bastion of free speech" specifically to describe Reddit, as noted by The New Yorker and The Verge.

Huffman also worked to make the site more advertiser-friendly and led efforts to host videos and images on site. In late 2016, Huffman was the focus of controversy for altering posts on a subreddit popular with supporters of Donald Trump, /r/The Donald. Following criticism from Reddit users, he undid the change and issued an apology. Beginning in 2017, Huffman led the redesign of Reddit's website with its first major visual update in a decade. Huffman said the site had looked like a "dystopian Craigslist" whose outdated look deterred new users. Development of the new site took more than a year, and the redesign launched in April 2018.

In 2020, Fortune magazine included him in their '40 Under 40' listing in the technology category.

In anticipation to Reddit's initial public offering, it was revealed that Huffman’s compensation package for 2023 was worth $193.2 million, which included a salary of $341,346, stock awards worth $98.3 million and stock options valued at $93.8 million.

In September 2024, Huffman was named by TIME as one of the 100 most influential people in AI.

== Controversies and criticism ==
=== Comment modification controversy ===
On November 23, 2016, a member of a subreddit dedicated to Donald Trump, r/The_Donald, posted evidence indicating that Reddit administrators had modified multiple user comments inside the subreddit. Following this post, Huffman took responsibility for the comment modifications, writing that "Our community team is pretty pissed at me, so I most assuredly won't do this again." His administrative modifications involved changing one specific insulting phrase, in several comments, to make them appear as if the insults were directed toward the moderators of the subreddit instead of him. In a Reddit post, Huffman wrote that he "messed with" some of the comments but that he "restored the original comments after less than an hour." On November 30, 2016, Huffman announced that sticky posts from r/The_Donald would no longer show up on r/all, stating that the community's moderators were abusing the feature in order to "slingshot posts into r/all, often in a manner that is antagonistic to the rest of the community."

=== Black Lives Matter ===
On June 1, 2020, Huffman published an open letter as Reddit's CEO, titled "Remember the Human – Black Lives Matter", which addressed the topic of racism on the platform.

Former Reddit CEO Ellen Pao called out Huffman's letter with a tweet on her official Twitter profile, saying that Reddit had long condoned racism and that the platform "monetizes white supremacy". The popular NBA and NFL subreddits agreed with Pao, obscuring their sections for 24 hours. Alexis Ohanian resigned on June 5, 2020, asking to be replaced by a black director and urging the company to finally ban hate speech and hate communities on Reddit in an open letter.

=== 2023 API changes ===
In April 2023, Reddit announced changes in its API rules. In response to the announced plan to begin charging some third-party apps for access to its API, several third-party apps, including Apollo, announced that they would shut down services. The announced changes led to planning for protests across the platform scheduled for June 12, 2023, including several thousand subreddits temporarily switching to private-only access for 48 hours.

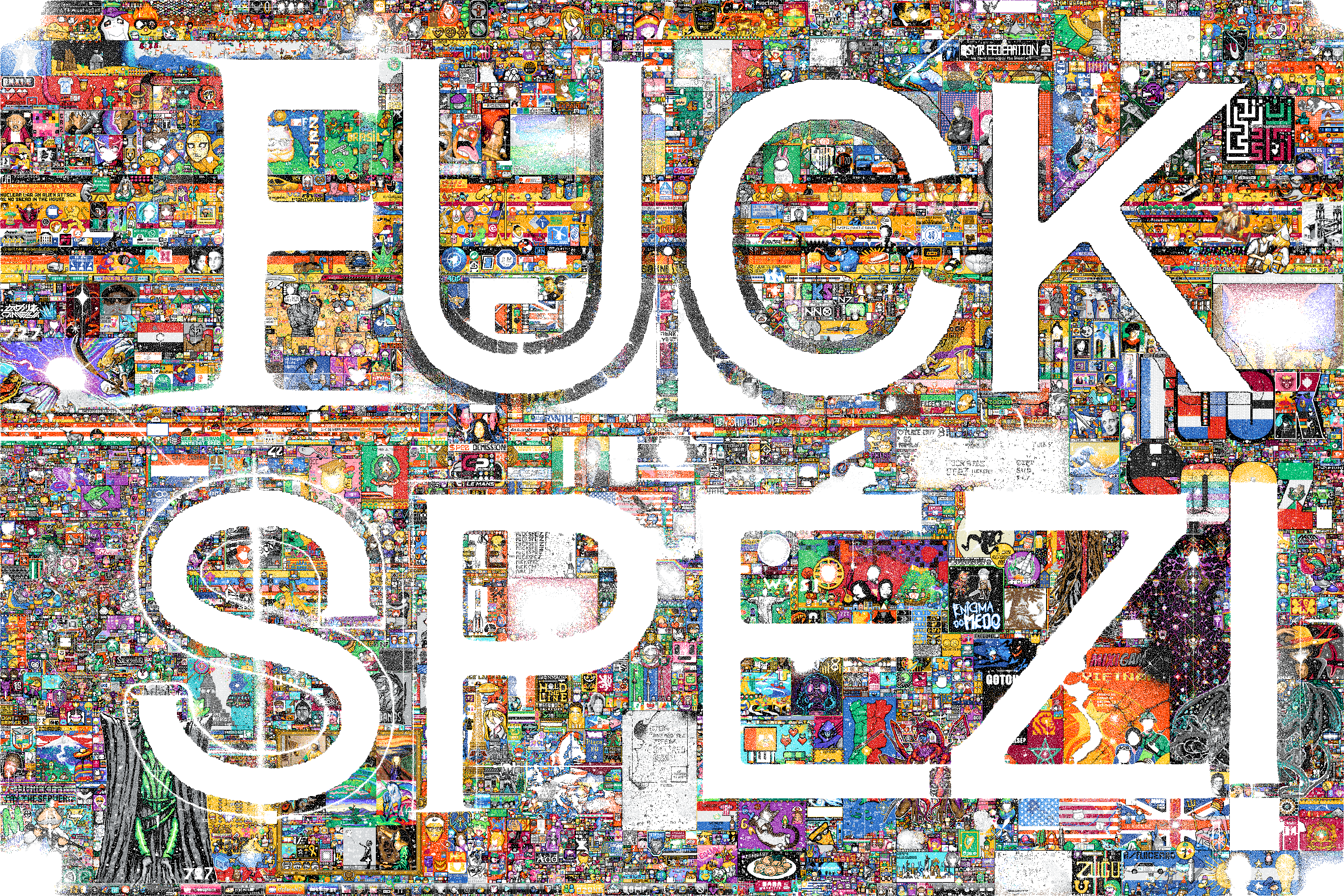
"Fuck spez!" written by Reddit users across the July 2023 canvas of r/place

In response, Huffman held an AMA (Ask Me Anything) on June 9, 2023; according to Wes Davis at The Verge, "Huffman was met with seemingly universal anger" and "If there are positive comments, I didn't find them." During the AMA, Huffman said the plan to begin charging some apps for access to the Reddit API on July 1, 2023, and to limit third-party app access to mature content from Reddit was still scheduled to happen. After the AMA, some subreddits announced their suspension of public access would be indefinite, until API policy issues were addressed.

In July 2023, Reddit relaunched its popular r/place experience in the midst of the API changes controversy, sparking mass protests on the page regarding Huffman and his Reddit account u/spez, with the slogan "Fuck Spez!" featured repeatedly and noticeably, including similar sentiments expressed in other languages.

== Net neutrality activism ==
Huffman is an advocate for net neutrality rules. In 2017, he told The New York Times that without net neutrality protections, "you give internet service providers the ability to choose winners and losers". On Reddit, Huffman urged redditors to express support for net neutrality and contact their elected representatives in Washington, D.C. Huffman said that the repeal of net neutrality rules stifles competition. He said he and Reddit would continue to advocate for net neutrality.

== Personal life ==
Huffman lives in San Francisco, California. He mentors aspiring programmers at coding bootcamps including Hackbright Academy. Huffman was an instructor for e-learning courses on web development by Udacity. He is on the board of advisors for the Anti-Defamation League's Centre for Technology and Society.

Huffman is a ballroom dancer. At UVA, Huffman competed in intercollegiate competitions. Huffman married in 2009, but is now divorced. He has a daughter with his fiancée.
