= Pao v. Kleiner Perkins =

Gender discrimination lawsuit

- Started: February 24, 2015
- Decided: March 13, 2015

Ellen Pao v. Kleiner Perkins Caufield & Byers LLC and DOES 1-20 is a lawsuit filed in 2012 in San Francisco County Superior Court under the law of California by executive Ellen Pao for gender discrimination against her employer, the venture capital firm Kleiner Perkins. Overlapping with a number of studies condemning the representation of women in venture capital, the case was followed closely by reporters, advocacy groups and Silicon Valley executives. Given the tendency for similar cases to reach settlements out of court, coverage of Pao v. Kleiner Perkins described it as a landmark trial once it began in February 2015. On March 27, 2015 the jury found in favor of Kleiner Perkins on all counts.

== Background ==
=== Ellen Pao ===
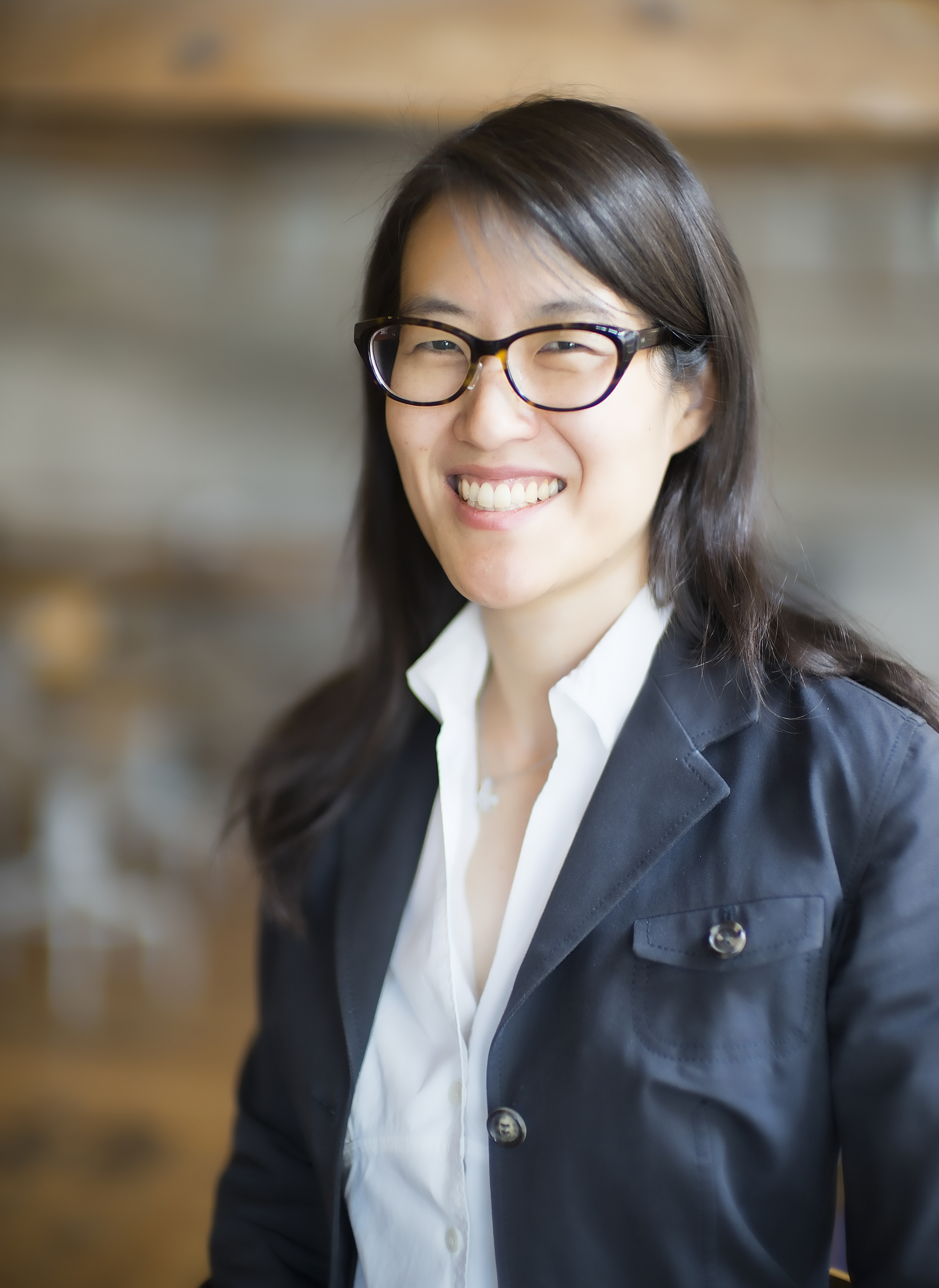
Ellen Pao, the plaintiff, in 2015

Ellen Pao is a Chinese-American woman from New Jersey. She has a bachelor's degree in electrical engineering from Princeton University, a juris doctor from Harvard Law School and an MBA from Harvard Business School.

From 1994 to 1996, Pao worked as a corporate attorney at Cravath, Swaine & Moore. In 1998, Pao worked at WebTV. Pao worked at several companies in Silicon Valley including BEA Systems as senior director, Corporate Business Development from 2001 until 2005.

In 2005 Pao joined Kleiner Perkins as technical chief of staff for John Doerr, a senior partner, a job that required degrees in engineering, law, and business, and experience in enterprise software. In 2007 she became a junior investing partner with Ted Schlein as her boss but was eventually passed over for a senior partner position. According to Pao, she had the job title of junior partner from her date of hiring and was promised an opportunity to move into an investing role. Doerr, who has expressed awareness of the gender gap at venture capital firms, mentored Pao, liberally providing feedback, but, in the end, agreed with the other senior partners who had made negative evaluations of her work at the firm. It was Pao's contention that men with similar profiles were, nevertheless, promoted.

On May 10, 2012, Pao filed a gender discrimination lawsuit against her employer alleging workplace retaliation by a married junior partner, Ajit Nazre, with whom she had an affair. She planned to continue working at the firm but left on October 1 claiming that she was terminated. Her lawyer said she was fired in retaliation for her lawsuit and the complaint was amended to add that cause of action.

Pao joined Reddit in 2013 and became interim CEO in November 2014 after Yishan Wong resigned.

=== Kleiner Perkins ===
Kleiner Perkins Caufield & Byers is a venture capital firm located in Menlo Park in Silicon Valley. The Wall Street Journal and other media have called it one of the "largest and most established" venture capital firms and it has been called "one of Silicon Valley's top venture capital providers" by Dealbook.

The firm specializes in investments in incubation and early stage companies. Since its founding in 1972, Kleiner Perkins Caufield & Byers has backed entrepreneurs in more than 500 ventures including AOL, Amazon.com, Navigenics, Citrix, Compaq, Electronic Arts, Genentech, Genomic Health, Geron Corporation, Google, Intuit, Juniper Networks, Nebula, Netscape, Sun Microsystems, Symantec, Verisign, WebMD and Zynga. KPCB focuses its global investments in three practice areas – digital, green tech and life sciences.

Although there are fewer women than men in both junior and senior positions employed by Kleiner Perkins, its gender gap is smaller than that of most other venture capital firms and its most prominent female partner, Mary Meeker, has called it "the best place to be for a woman in the business."

Representatives for Kleiner Perkins stated that they had offered Pao a five-month transition, with pay, to an operating role, and only fired her effective October 31, 2012 when she rejected the offer. They claimed that the decision to reassign her was made for performance reasons unrelated to the lawsuit.

== Causes of action ==
The original case was filed under the California Fair Employment and Housing Act and contained three causes of action:

- Employment discrimination based on gender:

12940. It is an unlawful employment practice, unless based upon a bona fide occupational qualification, or, except where based upon applicable security regulations established by the United States or the State of California: (a) For an employer, because of the race, religious creed, color, national origin, ancestry, physical disability, mental disability, medical condition, genetic information, marital status, sex, gender, gender identity, gender expression, age, sexual orientation, or military and veteran status of any person, to refuse to hire or employ the person or to refuse to select the person for a training program leading to employment, or to bar or to discharge the person from employment or from a training program leading to employment, or to discriminate against the person in compensation or in terms, conditions, or privileges of employment.

- Workplace retaliation:

(h) For any employer, labor organization, employment agency, or person to discharge, expel, or otherwise discriminate against any person because the person has opposed any practices forbidden under this part or because the person has filed a complaint, testified, or assisted in any proceeding under this part.

- Failure to take reasonable steps to prevent gender discrimination:

(k) For an employer, labor organization, employment agency, apprenticeship training program, or any training program leading to employment, to fail to take all reasonable steps necessary to prevent discrimination and harassment from occurring.

Following her termination the complaint was amended and a second count of retaliation, termination, was added. The actual damages demanded by the suit totalled $16 million. This is approximately the amount that Pao floated in a conversation with COO Eric Keller when asked what it would take to change her mind about staying at the company. Pao explained that she "wanted my payment to be enough so it was a meaningful amount to Kleiner Perkins, so they saw it would be painful to not fix problems." The plaintiff also made a plea for punitive damages. Although Judge Harold Kahn initially leaned toward denying this motion, he approved it on March 21, 2015.

== Trial ==
The matter went to trial in late February 2015 with jury selection on Monday, February 23, and opening statements on Tuesday, February 24. The trial, lasting 24 days, resulted in a verdict for Kleiner Perkins. It was covered by the national media and elicited broad comment regarding the issues raised. The case was live blogged and tweeted, to the point that the constant coverage provided both humorous and serious feedback to lawyers and witnesses.

The trial was heard before a jury of 6 women and 6 men drawn from diverse employment and ethnic backgrounds and Judge Harold E. Kahn at San Francisco Superior Court. Kleiner Perkins was principally represented by Lynne Hermle of Orrick, Herrington & Sutcliffe. It was also supported by Jessica Perry of the same firm and by its own counsel Paul Vronsky. Pao was represented by Alan Exelrod of Rudy Exelrod Zieff & Lowe and by Therese Lawless of Lawless & Lawless.

It was a trial to a jury of 12 who, under the rules of the court, were permitted to submit written questions to witnesses. The judge was also permitted to question witnesses. Witnesses were disclosed and deposed prior to the trial and transcripts of their depositions were available to counsel for the opposing sides and could be compared to the testimony of the witness in the courtroom. There were hundreds of exhibits consisting of documents and emails which the court had audio-visual equipment to display to the witness, jury, and audience.

=== Plaintiff's case ===
The plaintiff presented her case first, arguing that men were promoted ahead of women, that ideas coming from women were more quickly dismissed and that women who experienced sexual harassment received little support. Pao claimed that Ajit Nazre, the partner who initiated a sexual relationship with her, was responsible for much of this harassment. Pao said that he began excluding her from important meetings and emails after she ended the relationship. To characterize the company's response, her case explained that $22,000 was deducted from his paycheck once and that there was no strong desire to reprimand him until an outside investigation was able to link him to multiple instances of harassment. Additionally Pao said that she felt the need to move from green tech to the digital division to avoid him. Pao was asked if she objected to having Nazre's office moved to the same corridor as her own. However, she claimed that when she said "yes", the company responded by trying to move her office rather than cancelling the move of Nazre's.

It was explained that Pao sourced an investment in RPX Corporation, a company designed to fight patent trolls, which led to an IPO. While arguing that this was adequate reason for a promotion, her side disputed KPCB's rationale for keeping her off the board of directors. They argued that the policies for how many investments and how many board seats could involve junior partners were unevenly applied between women and men. Performance reviews were raised to show contradictory evaluations such as "too bold" and "too quiet". As further evidence that Pao's work for the company was not appreciated, they pointed to potential investments in Twitter and The Climate Corporation which were turned down after Pao proposed them, both of which were seen to be profitable later on.

A number of incidents were described in the plaintiff's case including a Valentine's Day gift that she considered inappropriate, a conversation in a company jet that she felt objectified women, a dinner in Al Gore's apartment to which no women were invited and a ski trip which invited one woman on a technicality. Pao stated that she did not speak out about these when they occurred because she did not want a "reputation as a complainer". Issues with her last year at Kleiner Perkins concerned a memorandum she sent on January 4, 2012 and an alleged absence of training and policies to prevent discrimination. The plaintiff argued that the defendant took several steps to cover up aspects that reflected poorly on its record of gender equality.

=== Defendant's case ===
The defendant's case placed emphasis on its large ratio of women compared to other venture capital firms. An example statistic was that it had 11 female partners and a 20% female staff compared to the average of 7-11% based on studies in 2011 and 2013. A 2014 study found that this number dropped to 4% when only senior partners were considered. The defense also argued that Pao was paid more than most of her male colleagues. While salaries had previously been redacted from legal documents, the trial revealed that Pao's salary after bonuses eventually reached a peak of $560,000. They also pointed to several opportunities that were afforded to Pao including a speech coach, mentorship from John Doerr and a longer career than that of many other junior partners. To argue that Pao's firing was justified, they presented several negative performance reviews that she received and frequently described her as "entitled" and "not a team player".

Kleiner Perkins contended that Pao's job description had been mostly managerial and that limiting her involvement in investing was not a sign of discrimination. They also said that promotions to the senior partner position were rare with 20 of the 25 people previously in Pao's position also being passed over. The defense brought in emails to show that Pao expected to be fired and suggested that some of them provided evidence that she was plotting a lawsuit. They also argued over whether her acceptance of severance pay constituted a tacit approval that the company was within its rights to fire her. The package was potentially valued at $400,000 but Pao did not receive the full amount on account of finding a job within less than a year. There are also reports that she turned it down entirely. Stating that many of the plaintiff's claims were stale, KPCB's side offered some explanations for the incidents she described and alleged that she saw discrimination where none existed. They claimed that this provided further evidence that she was an unpleasant coworker.

The defendant tried to introduce another line of argument based on Pao having a financial motive for filing the lawsuit. They stated in a sidebar that she may have done this to help alleviate the financial troubles of her husband Buddy Fletcher, a hedge fund manager who filed for bankruptcy in 2012. However, Judge Harold Kahn ruled out this defence stating that it would place undue scrutiny on the plaintiff's personal life. Additionally, Pao maintained that their money had always been separate due to a prenuptial agreement. At the time, Fletcher was reading news about the trial and not making courtroom appearances, on the advice of Pao and her lawyers.

=== Witnesses ===
While most of the witnesses had some affiliation with Kleiner Perkins, many of them had left the firm by the time the trial took place. Some witnesses, such as John Doerr, were called by both the plaintiff and defense lawyers. Exelrod began by showing pictures of three male witnesses, Amol Deshpande, Chi-Hua Chien and Wen Hsieh, saying that they were promoted ahead of Pao despite joining the firm later and not investing in any companies that went public. Hermle countered that other men not shown were not promoted and that those three were seen as assets because they had started businesses before being hired.

The first witness called was Tracy "Trae" Vassallo who agreed to testify despite remembering a conversation in which Pao called her "untrustworthy". Her appearance was described as a surprise. Having received a promotion to senior partner after Pao's termination, Vassallo testified that she still enjoyed working for KPCB but had problems with Chien and Nazre. About Nazre, she said he accosted her while in a bath robe and propositioned her at a dinner after lying that it would involve other contacts of theirs. She testified that her boss Ray Lane told her that she "should be flattered" by his advances and asked her to "talk to her husband" before deciding what to do. Lane denied making the former comment. Along with explaining that she confided in Pao and filed the complaint which eventually led to Nazre's termination, Vassallo mentioned the seating plan of a meeting in which she and Pao were told to sit in the back. Her description was "it sounds petty, but people were arranged in the room around how much input they'd have in the discussion."

The second witness was Chi-Hua Chien who confirmed that he organized the ski trip and the Al Gore dinner, both of which had only male guests. For the ski trip, he said this was done to ease the logistics of condo sharing and that if the trip were repeated in another year, it would have involved more women to make up for this. He denied the plaintiff's claim that he said "women kill the buzz." Regarding the dinner, a deposition video was brought up in which Aileen Lee testified that she and John Doerr complained about the lack of women. Pao said she felt humiliated because she lived in the building where the event was being held and had to explain to the guests passing by that she was not one of them. Pao's side presented emails that showed Chien complaining about her in a vulgar way. Chien stated that he was collegial at first and only developed problems with Pao later on. The defense also argued that Chien would not have been named as a trustee of Lee's firm Cowboy Ventures if his respect for women had been doubted.

=== Kleiner Perkins' testimony ===
Kleiner Perkins CFO Susan Biglieri testified that Mary Meeker and Beth Seidenberg were the first two women in the firm's history to reach its highest rank of "managing member". Pao's legal team argued that these promotions in 2011 and 2012 were made to save face in the wake of Pao's discrimination complaints. Biglieri also testified that the firm's anti-discrimination policy, though distributed internally, was not posted on the website until after Ellen Pao filed her lawsuit. The plaintiff also showed that an Equal Opportunity Employment policy had to be written in 2012 after COO Eric Keller failed to find one.

Rejecting claims that she was hired into an operating role, Pao explained that she initially turned down the job offer from Kleiner Perkins but arranged with John Doerr to make it "more senior". Some of Pao's duties included reviewing 1,800 iFund applications, writing part of Mary Meeker's USA Inc report and ghostwriting many of Doerr's speeches including a TED Talk. Doerr testified that he praised Pao's writing skills from her date of hiring but only learned that she resented this work much later. Doerr also recalled that before convincing her to stay, Pao wanted to leave in 2007 due to frustration with Ajit Nazre. Another of Pao's attempts to leave was protested by Ted Schlein, her boss after Doerr. Although Schlein testified that he "reluctantly" hired Pao, he also said that he convinced her to stay at the firm when she was being considered for one of the original jobs in Google Ventures. Schlein's testimony covered reviews that were frequently critical of Pao, using "entitled", "passive" and "territorial" to describe her. He was criticized for a comment that venture capital skills were "not part of Ellen's genetic makeup." Doerr claimed that he frequently defended Pao and advocated for the reviews to be rewritten until eventually supporting her termination. He said "the junior partner is an up-or-out role. We have no lifetime junior partners." When Hermle presented a list of female partners to Doerr, he described playing a role in all of their careers. However, Exelrod argued that Doerr was responsible for some sexism as well by playing a video where he stated that "white male nerds" were a safe investment. Although Pao spoke positively of Doerr, she commented that he often raised issues of pregnancy and suggested that her three-month maternity leave was the real reason she did not receive a board seat at RPX. Doerr stated that having junior partners sit on only one board was a guideline, not a rule. Pao contended that Chien had "five or six" board seats as a junior but the defense replied that he may have shortened "board observer seat" to "board seat" as a form of bragging and stated that Matt Murphy took five years to join a board.

=== Pao's testimony ===
Testimony of the plaintiff occupied most of the second week. She described mentoring Wen Hsieh and recalled hearing about three administrative assistants who were harassed by Nazre. When questioned about this, Pao knew only that one of their first names was Tina, inviting theories that the women had settled with Kleiner Perkins and signed non-disclosure agreements. On cross-examination, Hermle found an inconsistency with Pao's deposition video on the question of whether she asked to see an Equal Opportunity Employment policy. She also sought to show evidence of plotting in 2011 and 2012 by bringing up emails in which Pao discussed her options with friend and Google engineer Lori Park. These revealed that Pao had applied for jobs at YouTube and Menlo Ventures and was considering starting her own firm. Some issues with how Pao responded to termination were also raised. Pao said that it made sense for her to break the news to the CEOs of the three companies in her immediate network but revealed that Ted Schlein chastised her for doing so. On the stand, Pao objected to the way Employment Law Alliance investigator Stephen Hirschfeld responded to the discrimination complaints by Trae Vassallo and herself. She alleged that the reports used biased language, softened the airplane incident by changing the name of a pornographic show to Entourage and focused on eliminating KPCB's liability rather than addressing the concerns of employees. When Hirschfeld was questioned by Lawless, he revealed that his reports did not include a matrix which Vassallo used to tabulate discrepancies between male and female partners. This criticism was repeated by Allison West of Employment Practices Specialists who testified that the firm's investigation of gender issues was insufficient. She also commented that it was circular for the defendant to rely heavily on performance reviews to discredit Pao's allegations against the people writing them.

=== Kleiner Perkins' witnesses testify ===
Contrasting Pao's statement that she discussed gender bias with Aileen Lee and Trae Vassallo, the defendant named three female witnesses who stated that they never felt discriminated against: Mary Meeker, Beth Seidenberg and Juliet de Baubigny. Private human resources consultant Rhoma Young defended the attention to detail in KPCB's review process and Harvard Business School professor Paul Gompers spoke favorably of its commitment to diversity. Another professor testifying for Kleiner Perkins, David Lewin of UCLA, alleged that Pao's claim to $16 million was invalid because she could have secured a lucrative salary with a more thorough job search. When Mary Meeker testified, she described Pao as "insecure" and "quiet" and recalled being invited to a second Al Gore dinner. Beth Seidenberg compared venture capital to her background in the medical field and said she was optimistic that it would see an influx of female talent as well. Juliet de Baubigny testified more directly about Ellen Pao and condemned her habit of making complaints against coworkers. She also denied using the word "sex addict" to describe Ajit Nazre, something that the plaintiff cited as evidence that his hostility was common knowledge.

=== Final week testimony ===
Testifying in the final week was an investor witness from outside Kleiner Perkins named Andrew Jody Gessow, a passenger of the private flight that Pao described as offensive. He claimed that there was no discussion of pornography but Lawless pressed that his memory may have lapsed due to medication he was taking. Senior partner Randy Komisar also testified that week about why he received the board seat at RPX despite his investment in it being a joint effort with Ellen Pao. He stated that Pao described her respect for John Doerr's decision in an email and interpreted that as meaning she agreed with it. Komisar said that his friendship with Pao deteriorated over the word "hate" when she wrote in a later email that the board of RPX "hated him". He also testified that a book described as making Pao feel uneasy was a Valentine's day gift from him. Specifically it was the Book of Longing by Leonard Cohen with whom Pao claimed to be unfamiliar. One of the last people to testify was senior partner Matt Murphy who described Pao as "pushy" and "aggressive". He also recalled being embarrassed when Pao fell asleep at a board meeting. Although admitting that he began taking detailed notes about Pao four days after her suit was filed, he maintained that he had wanted to fire her for years and that only resistance from Doerr stood in the way. Discussing a negative performance review, Exelrod asked Murphy to explain why Pao was able to receive high praise from Mike McCue. Murphy's response was that McCue was known for saying overly positive things.

=== Jury instructions ===
The jury was reminded of the plaintiff's claims in which number 1 had to be proven before number 3 could be considered:

1. Kleiner Perkins discriminated against Ellen Pao because of her gender.
2. Kleiner Perkins retaliated against her because of conversations in December 2011 and her memorandum in January 2012.
3. Kleiner Perkins failed to take all reasonable steps to prevent discrimination against her.
4. Kleiner Perkins retaliated by firing her after her conversations and memorandum.

There were no sexual harassment claims. The standard of proof was preponderance of the evidence, met if a proposition is more likely to be true than not.

Despite the title of "junior partner," Ellen Pao was an at-will employee who could be fired without warning at any time for any reason or for no reason but not for the wrong reasons such as a statutory exception where "actions or inactions were substantially motivated by gender discrimination and/or retaliation". "Substantial motivating reasons and factors are more than remote or trivial motivating reasons and factors."

It was explained that compensatory damages are an estimate of the plaintiff's past and future lost earnings. Other, more complicated and technical, compensatory damages were reserved for future determination in the event of a favorable verdict for plaintiff.

If the jury felt the defendant's actions involved malice, fraud and oppression they could have considered punitive damages after the initial verdict was returned. There was a 7-page verdict form.

=== Closing arguments ===
Alan Exelrod made the closing argument for plaintiff, saying that the defendant's leaders "ran Kleiner Perkins like a boys' club." Lynne Hermle made the closing statement for defendant, focusing on the issues of the numbers of women employed and the allegedly discriminatory events. According to her, the plaintiff was fired because, while she is an excellent executive, she was not able to perform in venture capital at a senior level. Therese Lawless presented the rebuttal on behalf of the plaintiff, saying "women will be judged in one way and men in another. That's not how it works in this country." She also thanked an anonymous member of the jury whose question revealed that an evaluation, deemed to be negative based on its long comments from Matt Murphy and Ted Schlein, actually received input from 7 people, 5 of whom reviewed Pao positively.

=== Submission and verdict ===
The case was submitted to the jury about noon on March 25, 2015. A unanimous verdict was not required, only support of 9 of the 12 jurors, 75%. It was reported that when deliberations began, impressions of the jurors were 8 siding with Kleiner Perkins, 2 siding with Ellen Pao and 2 undecided with all groups split evenly by gender.

The initial verdict was announced shortly after 2 p.m. on Friday, March 27. The jury found 10-2 in favor of Kleiner Perkins on the first 3 claims. The jury, which found 8 to 4 in favor of Kleiner Perkins on the fourth claim of retaliation by termination, was directed to continue to deliberate as the finding did not meet the required threshold of 75%. The jury deliberated for about two hours then returned a final verdict in favor of Kleiner Perkins on all claims as one juror changed his vote from yes to no on the 4th claim. According to the three jurors who talked to the media, the jury focused on Pao's performance reviews in arriving at their verdict.

On the same day, jurors Steve Sammut and Marshallette Ramsey revealed what their votes had been. Ramsey supported the plaintiff and said that she encouraged other women in Pao's situation to stand up for themselves. Her reason was that it "seemed that the men, with the same character flaws that Ellen was cited with, were able to propel and continue." Although Sammut was not convinced that what Pao experienced was gender discrimination, he expressed a hope that Kleiner Perkins would still be punished for how it treated employees in general.

=== Costs and appeal ===
The defendant requested costs of $972,814, 90% of which was for expert witness fees. Kleiner Perkins stated that the fee would be waived if the plaintiff chose not to appeal. On June 18, 2015 the court awarded $275,966 to Kleiner Perkins, stating that the disparity in economic resources between the parties was too great to justify the original amount. Pao's side claimed that this was an unfair response to a loss in a discrimination case and filed a notice of appeal on June 1, 2015, 7 days before the deadline. The appeal, which would have been held in the First District Court of Appeal, was to focus on the verdict since most procedural rulings by the judge were made in favor of the plaintiff.

On September 10, 2015, sources reported that Pao was dropping her appeal, citing an inability to afford further litigation. In a Re/code post on the topic, Pao wrote about the importance of discussing gender bias publicly and stated that she was rejecting requests from KPCB to sign a non-disparagement agreement. She stated that this would make her responsible for court costs after the appeal was dropped. However, on September 17, Kleiner Perkins accepted the dropping of Pao's appeal without the $276,000 cost reimbursement.

== Significance ==
Following the case, a number of other people filed discrimination suits against high-profile companies, as with Chia Hong v. Facebook and Tina Huang v. Twitter. A number of publications credited Pao and her case with focusing attention on the issue of gender discrimination and workplace sexism, especially in the venture capital and technology industries, and for inspiring others to act. The impact of Pao and the case became known as "the Pao effect". Afterwards, Pao v. Kleiner Perkins was again credited with inspiring a discrimination case when security researcher Katie Moussouris filed a suit against Microsoft.

== See also ==
- Sexism in the technology industry
- Women in computing

== Documents ==
- Kleiner Discrimination Case Documents
- Pao v. Kleiner Perkins verdict form
