= Michael Best =

American law firm

Michael Best & Friedrich LLP
- Headquarters: Milwaukee, Wisconsin
- No. of offices: 18
- No. of attorneys: 350
- Major practice areas: General practice
- Key people: David A. Krutz (Managing Partner)
- Revenue: $156,964,000 (2021)
- Profit per equity partner: $677,000 (2021)
- Date founded: 1848; 178 years ago
- Founder: Edward George Ryan
- Company type: Limited liability partnership
- Website: www.michaelbest.com

Michael Best & Friedrich LLP (commonly, referred to as "Michael Best") is a U.S. national law firm with more than 400 legal professionals, including more than 300 attorneys in 18 domestic offices. Michael Best's primary practice areas include corporate, government relations, public policy, political law, intellectual property, labor and employment, litigation, privacy & cybersecurity, real estate, regulatory, tax, and estate planning.

== History ==
Michael Best was founded in 1848 by Edward George Ryan, a Wisconsin trial attorney who later served as Chief Justice of the Wisconsin Supreme Court. Over the course of more than a hundred and seventy years, the firm expanded throughout Wisconsin and across the country through a series of expansions and mergers, eventually growing from a small legal practice to a full-service business law firm that serves clients in the United States and across the globe.

Michael Best is affiliated with various global law organizations, including Lex Mundi, a network of 160 law firms with over 21,000 attorneys in more than 100 countries; the Employment Law Alliance (ELA), a global network of employment and labor law firms; and the American Property Tax Counsel (APTC), a national affiliation of property tax law firms that provides major portfolio owners with a single source of tax advice.

== Attorney compensation ==
Unlike most U.S. national law firms, Michael Best does not generally disclose compensation offered to Associates. However, as mandated by the Colorado Equal Pay Act, the lateral attorney job openings posted on the firm's website indicate that, "[f]or Colorado applicants only," the starting associate salary is $150,000 per year. Numerous sources further report that base salary of Michael Best Associates based in other major markets (i.e., Austin, Chicago, and Washington, D.C., where Associate salaries typically start at $205,000 for new law school graduates), also start at $150,000.

== Notable alumni ==
- William A. Bablitch, Justice of the Wisconsin Supreme Court (1983-2003)
- Steven M. Biskupic, former United States Attorney for the Eastern District of Wisconsin
- David J. Cannon, former United States Attorney for the Eastern District of Wisconsin
- Reince Priebus, Chairman of the Republican National Committee (2011–2017) and White House Chief of Staff (2017)
- Edward George Ryan, Chief Justice of the Wisconsin Supreme Court (1874-1880)
