= Lynne Hermle =

American lawyer (born 1956)

Lynne C. Hermle
- Occupation: Attorney

Lynne C. Hermle (born 1956) is an attorney specializing in employment law. She has served as a partner at Orrick, Herrington & Sutcliffe LLP's Menlo Park, California, office. She also served on the firm's management committee, the "first partner from the firm's Silicon Valley office to serve, and the second woman ever chosen".

== Education and career ==
Hermle earned a B.A. in physical anthropology magna cum laude from the University of California, Santa Barbara and a J.D. from the University of California Hastings College of Law in 1981. She joined Orrick's San Francisco office as a senior associate in 1987 from AT&T where she handled employment matters as in-house counsel. In 1992 she became partner and in 1995 she helped open the firm's office in Menlo Park, California.

Hermle has significant experience working on complex discrimination and wage-and-hour class actions for high-profile companies including Apple, The Gap, Morgan Stanley, and others.

Hermle led the trial team that defended Silicon Valley–based venture capital firm Kleiner Perkins Caufield & Byers in a gender discrimination lawsuit filed by Ellen Pao in San Francisco. On March 27, 2015, Hermle and the Orrick trial team obtained a complete defense verdict for Kleiner Perkins in Pao v. Kleiner Perkins. Following 24 days of trial, a San Francisco jury rejected all of former partner Ellen Pao's claims that she was passed over for promotion and terminated because of her gender and complaints about discrimination. Hermle was named "Litigator of the Week" for this victory by American Lawyer which described her effective voir dire and how she "steadily poked holes in Pao's testimony." The Recorder called Hermle's cross-examination "masterful" and Bloomberg reported that her "charismatic, intimidating oratory made her the trial's breakout star."

Hermle also obtained a defense verdict in the high-profile trial of Maghribi v. Advanced Micro Devices (AMD) on behalf of AMD. Plaintiff, a senior Arab Muslim executive, sought $200 million in lost salary, bonuses and stock options and emotional distress damages, punitive damages and attorneys' fees, alleging post-September 11 discrimination. After a several-week trial, the jury returned in less than two hours with a defense verdict.

She also represented all four plaintiffs in Varian v. Delfino, a SLAPP case, obtaining a verdict of more than $3.5 million on Varian's cross-claim for trade secret theft. Hermle has had several other employment trial victories and she is listed in the 2005 edition of Marquis Who's Who.

She also serves as an Early Neutral Evaluator for the Northern District of California and has been appointed by that court to serve as a mediator in a complex class action.

Hermle has received many honors and accolades for her work as a litigator. Business Insider has described her as a "colorful character" and a "top-notch lawyer" who is "used to winning". It also recounted the fact that she had made her opponent "vomit in the courtroom". The Legal 500 (US) cited Hermle as "one of the best in the field" and the National Law Journal lauded her as one of America's Top 50 Women Litigators. She is also recognized as a leader in her field by Chambers USA, and Who's Who Legal, among others.

== Publications ==
- Ralph H. Baxter, Jr. and Lynne C. Hermle, Sexual Harassment in the Workplace: A Guide to the Law, (Executive Enterprises Publications Co., c1989). ISBN 1-55840-112-1
