= Women in venture capital =

Women in venture capital or VC are investors who provide venture capital funding to startups. Women make up a small (usually less than 10%) fraction of the venture capital private equity workforce. A widely used source for tracking the number of women in venture capital is the Midas List which has been published by Forbes since 2001. Research from Women in VC, a global community of women venture investors, shows that the percentage of female VC partners is just shy of 5 percent.

One of the first women to make the list, Annette Campbell-White, has been cited as an example of discrimination in venture capital. She was mentioned in the Midas List for three consecutive years, from 2005 to 2007. She claimed that a number of firms in the 1980s ignored her senior management experience in Hambrecht & Quist. In addition to finding that women make up the majority of early technology adopters, Harvard Business School Professor Paul Gompers has stated that female venture capitalists consistently perform as well as males at large firms that have more than one woman.

Questions about how to increase the number of VC opportunities for women have been brought to the forefront by several events. One of them is a lawsuit by Ellen Pao against her former employer Kleiner Perkins Caufield & Byers. Another is Elephant in the Valley, a survey aiming to expose discrimination started by several women in business including Tracy Vassallo, a former partner of the same firm. Expressing criticism of existing funds, a number of women since 2007 have begun to start their own.

== Statistics ==
Babson College’s Diana Report, research by an initiative working to increase the number of women entrepreneurs, found that the number of women partners in VC firms decreased from 10% in 1999 to 6% in 2014, though that number has recovered to 9.5% in 2018. The report also found that 97% of VC-funded businesses had male chief executives, and that businesses with all-male teams were more than four times as likely to receive VC funding compared to teams with at least one woman.

More than 75% of VC firms in the US did not have any female venture capitalists at the time they were surveyed. It was found that a greater fraction of VC firms had never had a woman represent them on the board of one of their portfolio companies. For comparison, a UC Davis study focusing on large public companies in California found 49.5% with at least one female board seat. When the latter results were published, some San Jose Mercury News readers dismissed the possibility that sexism was a cause. In a follow-up Newsweek article, Nina Burleigh asked "Where were all these offended people when women like Heidi Roizen published accounts of having a venture capitalist stick her hand in his pants under a table while a deal was being discussed?"

== Effect on the technology industry ==
Makers of software and related products receive the majority of venture capital funding in the US. Since the dot com boom, venture capital has become almost synonymous with technology startups due to the large potential investors see in this sector. Regarding the shortage of women in the industry, some venture capitalists have called this a contributing factor to similar gender disparity seen in a wider range of Silicon Valley companies.

These Silicon Valley leadership positions are mostly held by men, with only 15.7% of board members being women, according to a report by Fenwick & West. This compares negatively to the 20.9% across all S&P 100 firms. These numbers drop to 11% and 16% respectively when considering executive positions. Industry scholar Vivek Wadhwa has proposed that another contributing factor is a lack of parental encouragement to study science and engineering. He has also cited a lack of women role models and noted that most famous tech leaders like Bill Gates, Steve Jobs, and Mark Zuckerberg are men.

2014 saw the release of several corporate transparency reports that offered detailed employee breakdowns. The largest contributors were Google, Yahoo, Facebook, and Apple, who respectively reported that 17%, 15%, 15% and 20% of their tech employees were women. Subsequent commentary in USA Today pointed out that "women are underrepresented in Silicon Valley — from giant companies to start-ups to venture capital firms." In October of that year, Bloomberg reported that Apple, Facebook, Google, and Microsoft attended the 20th annual Grace Hopper Celebration of Women in Computing conference to recruit and potentially hire female engineers and technology experts. That same month, the second annual Platform Summit was held to discuss increasing racial and gender diversity in tech.

== Notable cases ==
The 2012 lawsuit Pao v. Kleiner Perkins was filed in San Francisco County Superior Court by executive Ellen Pao for gender discrimination against her employer, Kleiner Perkins Caufield & Byers. The case went to trial in February 2015. On March 27, 2015 the jury found in favor of Kleiner Perkins on all counts. Nevertheless, the case, which had wide press coverage, resulted in major advances in consciousness of gender discrimination on the part of venture capital and technology firms and their women employees. Three later cases, one of which was dropped, include lawsuits against Facebook, Twitter and Microsoft.

== Possible solutions ==
Women are far outnumbered by their male counterparts in venture capital. Eileen Lee, cofounder of Cowboy Ventures, one of the most prominent women in venture capital in Silicon Valley, started a group with fellow women in venture capital who seek "to both mentor and increase the number of women founders and women in venture capital". Groups that advocate for women in venture capital and help them find positions in the field are seeking to break down gender biases and stereotypes that prevent women from succeeding in venture capital to begin with.

There are steps that can be taken within the venture capital field to help women in the industry. One of the ways in which more women can obtain jobs in venture capital is to increase the number of women in U.S. graduate school business programs. According to Joan Winn in her journal article “Women Entrepreneurs: Can We Remove The Barriers?”, one-third of the individuals enrolled in graduate school business programs were women. Many graduate business programs try to recruit women, yet are unsuccessful in doing so. Winn believes that if these universities were to cater their programs more towards women by accommodating their obligations to work and family needs, their percentages of women would be higher. Enrollment in a graduate business program would prepare them for the venture capital field.

Winn says that one of the main problems women face is a lack of funding or capital for their ventures. According to Fortune, funding for female venture capital founders was 2.2% of all venture capital dollars in 2018. Although women-founded venture capital firms are far less prevalent than male-founded firms, the disparity of the disbursement of venture capital dollars is high. The most plausible solution to this issue is to provide more funding for venture capital funds led by women. Having sufficient funding will generate more capital for their firms, allowing women to feel comfortable with making investments, especially where there is risk.

== List of women in venture capital ==
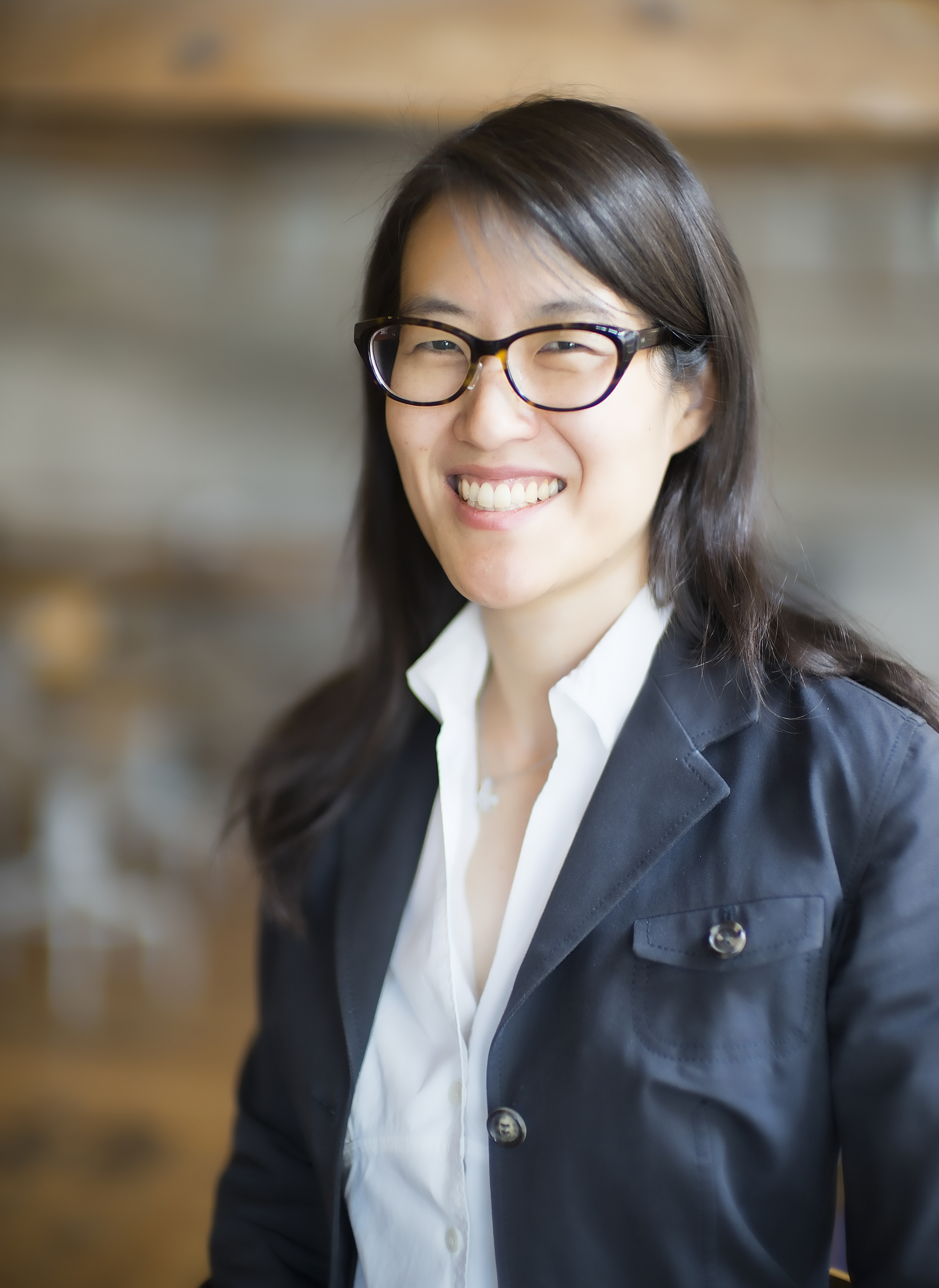
Ellen Pao, who began her venture capital career at Kleiner Perkins Caufield & Byers, has also worked as an executive for Reddit, Flipboard and other technology companies.

In alphabetical order by last name:

- Patty Abramson, Women's Growth Capital Fund
- Patricia Cloherty
- Soraya Darabi, co-founder of Trail Mix Ventures
- Jennifer Fonstad, formerly at Draper Fisher Jurvetson, founded Aspect Ventures with Theresia Gouw Ranzetta in 2014.
- Jeannette zu Fürstenberg, General Catalyst
- Kathryn Gould, Foundation Capital
- Theresia Gouw, Acrew Capital
- Lauren Gross, partner and COO at the Founders Fund
- Arlan Hamilton, founded Backstage Capital
- Ann Lamont (Ann Huntress Lamont), Oak Investment Partners
- Aileen Lee, Cowboy Ventures
- Jenny Lee, GGV Capital
- Jess Lee, Sequoia Capital
- Caroline Lewis, Managing Partner at Rogue Women's Fund
- Holly Maloney, General Catalyst
- Crystal McKellar, founder of Aloft VC
- Mary Meeker, Kleiner Perkins Caufield & Byers
- Kara Nortman, Monarch Collective
- Lynne Chou O'Keefe, Define Ventures
- Stephanie Palmeri, SoftTech VC
- Ellen Pao, Kleiner Perkins Caufield and Byers
- Megan Quinn, Spark Capital
- Jewel Burks Solomon, Collab Capital
- Elizabeth "Beezer" Clarkson, Sapphire Ventures
- Chelsea Stoner, VC at Battery Ventures
- Cathy Tie, Cervin Ventures
- Elena Viboch, General Catalyst
- Margit Wennmachers, Andreessen Horowitz

== See also ==
- Diversity of Silicon Valley
- Sexism in the technology industry
- Women in computing
