= Anthony Nakache =

French business executive

- Citizenship: France
- Education: INSEAD (MBA)
- Occupation: Business executive
- Employer: Google
- Title: Managing Director, Google Middle East and North Africa
- Term: February 2022
- Predecessor: Lino Cattaruzzi

Anthony Nakache is a French business executive who has served as managing director of Google in the Middle East and North Africa (MENA), based in Dubai, since February 2022.

== Career ==
Nakache joined Google in 2008. Before leading Google MENA, he held senior partnership roles, including leading an online partnerships group responsible for scaling monetization solutions for publishers and developers across Europe, the Middle East and Africa (EMEA).

In October 2021, he was credited as director, online partnerships, Google, in connection with Google News Showcase launching in Ireland.

According to Forbes Middle East, he started his career at Altran in France in 2001, was based in Ireland before moving to Dubai in 2022, and was listed as French in its Global Meets Local 2024 ranking.

== Initiatives and partnerships ==
In December 2024, Hub71 and Google for Startups announced a partnership in Abu Dhabi, including plans for a dedicated accelerator programme in 2025; Nakache was quoted as managing director for Google in MENA.

In early 2025, a five-year partnership between Dubai Culture and Google was reported by the Emirates News Agency (WAM), with Nakache quoted about expanding the Dubai Culture and Heritage project on Google Arts & Culture and a related creatives bootcamp.

Google also announced a collaboration with the UAE's Artificial Intelligence, Digital Economy, and Remote Work Applications Office to launch the “AI for All” initiative, describing training programs planned throughout 2026.

== Education ==
Nakache has been reported as holding an MBA from INSEAD and an engineering degree in telecommunications.
