= Korbyt =

Digital signage company based in Dallas, Texas

RMG Networks Holding Corporation
- Type: Private
- Industry: Digital signage
- Founded: 1980
- Headquarters: Dallas, Texas, United States
- Area served: Worldwide
- Key people: Ankur Ahlowalia, CEO; Stuart Mitchell, CFO; Colm Nee, CTO
- Website: www.gokorbyt.com

Korbyt, formerly RMG Networks, Reach Media Group and Danoo, is an American workplace software and digital signage company. It is headquartered in Dallas, Texas, with additional worldwide offices in the United Kingdom and the United Arab Emirates. Its self-titled platform, Korbyt, provides content management, performance dashboards and data visualization for desktops and mobile devices. The company traces its origin back to an early-1980s digital signage company Symon Communications.

== History ==
=== 2006–2013: Early Years ===
Reach Media Group was founded in 2006 as Danoo and received financial backing from Kleiner Perkins Caufield & Byers, DAG Ventures, National CineMedia and Tennenbaum Capital Partners. In July 2009, Danoo acquired certain assets of IdeaCast, thus expanding its consumer base to fitness clubs and airline passengers. In August 2009, the company renamed itself RMG Networks and appointed Garry McGuire to take over as CEO from Aileen Lee.

=== 2013–2018: Transition to RMG Networks ===
The company went public via a reverse merger with SCG Financial Acquisition Corp. in April 2013, which allowed being re-listed on NASDAQ as RMG Networks at $10 per share. The same month, the company acquired Symon Communications, a digital signage company founded in 1980, for $45.5 million. As a result, RMG moved its headquarters from San Francisco to the Dallas metropolitan area, the previous location of Symon Communications.

The same month, RMG Networks was named a winner for the Queen’s Award for Enterprise in International Trade 2013, received for three consecutive years of "outstanding export growth", and its representatives attended a celebratory reception at Buckingham Palace for the occasion in July.

=== 2018–Present: Going private and re-branding ===
By 2018, RMG was facing challenges as a publicly-traded company. As a result, executive chairman Gregory Sachs and an equity firm Virgo Capital issued a proposal to take the company private, which sparked an internal dispute and an alternative recapitalization proposal from Hale Capital Partners, Inc. When in August 2018 the latter proposal did not pass, three out of six RMG board members resigned. Later in 2018, RMG agreed to be acquired by Virgo Capital and Sachs Capital Group, making the company privately-owned.

In September 2020, RMG appointed Silicon Valley software executive Ankur Ahlowalia as chief executive officer. On September 23, 2020, RMG announced re-branding to match the name of its core product, Korbyt.

== See also ==
- Digital signage
