= Wei Christianson =

Chinese-American businesswoman and lawyer

- 孙玮
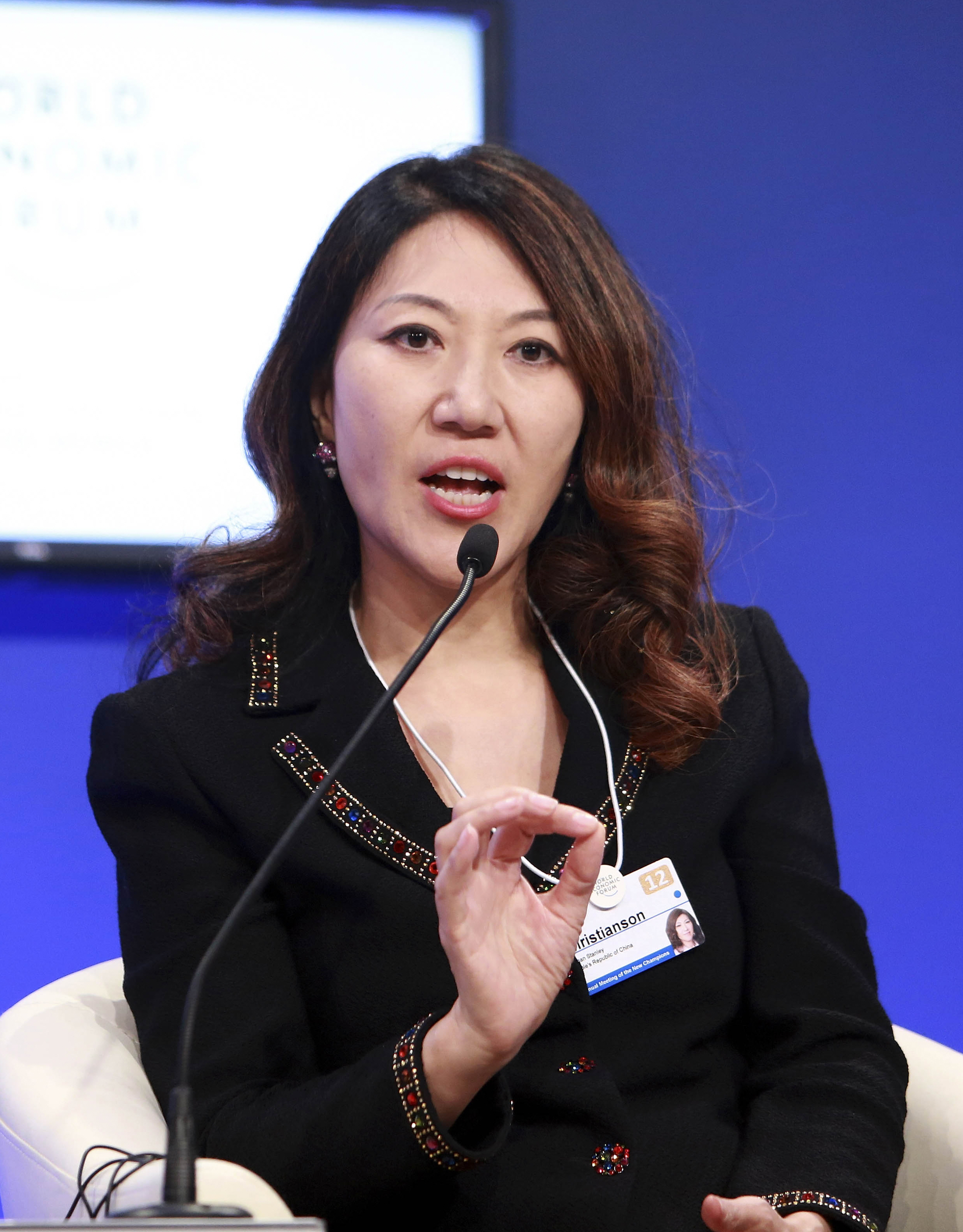
- Born: Wei Sun; August 21, 1956 (age 69); Beijing, China
- Education: Beijing National Day School; Amherst College (BA); Columbia Law School (JD)
- Occupations: Businesswoman; lawyer
- Title: CEO and Managing Director China; Co-CEO Asia Pacific, Morgan Stanley
- Children: 3

Wei Christianson
- Simplified Chinese: 孙玮
- Traditional Chinese: 孫瑋
Transcriptions
Standard Mandarin
- Hanyu Pinyin: Sūn Wěi

Wei Christianson (née Sun; born August 21, 1956) is a Chinese-American businesswoman and lawyer, former CEO of Morgan Stanley's China operations and co-CEO of its Asia Pacific division.

== Early life and education ==
Wei Sun Christianson was born on August 21, 1956, to a People's Liberation Army officer father and doctor mother as part of the Frontier Generation from China's Cultural Revolution. She grew up in Beijing as the youngest of four daughters. She took the Gao Kao in 1978 and was accepted by the Beijing Language and Culture University, with the intention of learning English and working as a translator for the Ministry of Foreign Affairs.

Encouraged by her Columbia University professor Randle Edwards, Christianson applied to a dozen liberal arts colleges in the United States. In 1983 she transferred to Amherst College and became its first student from mainland China to study in the United States, following China's re-opening to the Western world in the early 1980s. She graduated cum laude with a B.A. in political science in 1985.

She continued her studies in Columbia Law School, receiving her J.D. degree in international law in 1989, and meeting her future husband Jon Christianson.

== Career ==
Following Columbia Law School, Wei Christianson worked as an attorney in the New York offices of Orrick, Herrington & Sutcliffe.

After moving to Hong Kong in 1992, she attained a position as Associate Director in the Corporate Finance Department at the Hong Kong Securities and Futures Commission (SFC) where she was responsible for drafting the regulatory structure that would enable the companies of People's Republic of China to be listed outside China.

Christianson joined Morgan Stanley in 1998, where she was an executive director, Beijing chief representative, and a senior team member of its Resources, Power and Transportation Group, where she met her mentor John J. Mack. When Mack was ousted from Morgan Stanley in 2002, Christianson followed him to Credit Suisse First Boston, where he held positions as a managing director, chairman, and country manager. After that, Christianson joined Citigroup as a managing director and chairman of China, Citigroup Global Markets (Asia) Ltd., where she was responsible for the securities and investment banking businesses in China. Since returning to Morgan Stanley in 2006, she had been the chief executive officer for China. Christianson has led initial public offerings of Sinopec, China Life and SMIC, and oversaw the $4.2 billion acquisition of Gas Kazakhstan by CNPC. Christianson retired from Morgan Stanley in 2022. She joined the board of luxury goods conglomerate LVMH in 2024.

== Personal life ==
Christianson is married to American Jon L. Christianson, a retired former partner of Skadden, Arps, Slate, Meagher & Flom in its Corporate Department in Beijing. They have three sons, Erik ('14), Neil ('17), and Nicholas ('19). She lives with her family in Beijing.
