= Tally Technologies =

American Finance Company

Tally Technologies, Inc.
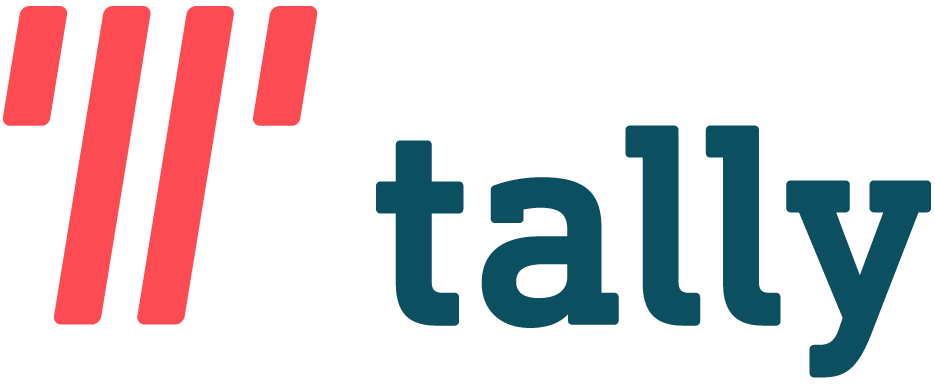
- Tally’s logo as of May 2016
- Type: Private
- Industry: Financial technology
- Founded: May 2015; 11 years ago
- Founders: Jason Brown; Jasper Platz
- Headquarters: San Francisco, California, United States
- Area served: United States
- Key people: Jason Brown (CEO), Jasper Platz (President)
- Products: Mobile application
- Services: Personal finance
- Website: meettally.com

Tally Technologies, Inc. (or simply Tally) was a San Francisco, California-based American financial services company founded by Jason Brown and Jasper Platz in 2015.

The company's smartphone app helps its users pay down their credit card debt, based on an analysis of their personal financial profiles and a new line of credit it provides with a lower interest rate. The app also manages credit card payments, allowing its users to avoid credit card late fees.

Tally earns revenue by charging interest when a user carries a balance. The company does not charge annual, balance transfer, late, prepayment or insufficient funds fees, and generates revenue only when it charges a lower APR than its users' credit cards.

Tally Technologies ceased operation and laid off its entire staff in August 2024. At that time, it had 183 employees and was valued at $855 million, with its headquarters located in San Franciso's Potrero Hill neighborhood.

== Founders and Investors ==
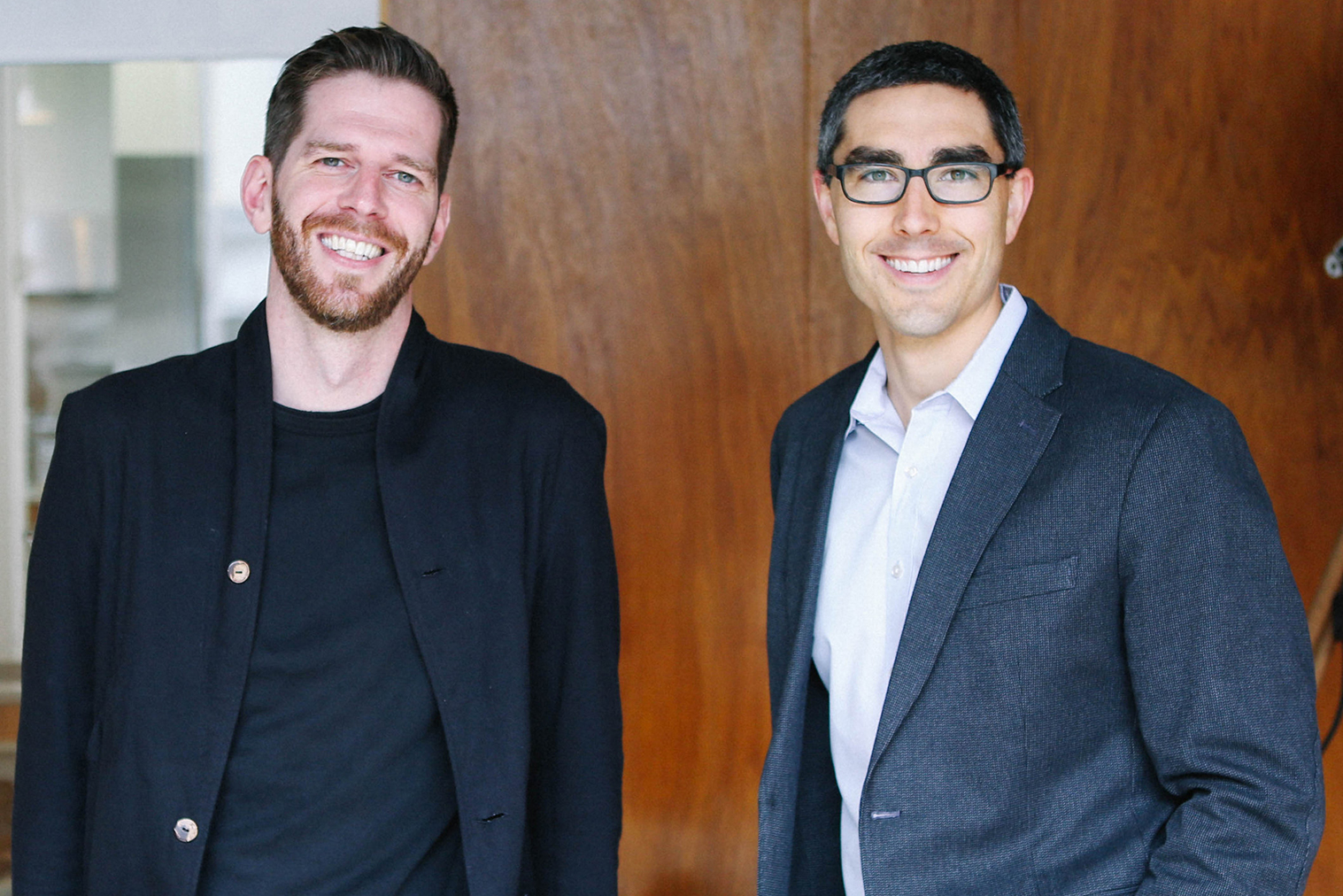
Jasper Platz and Jason Brown in San Francisco

Jason Brown and Jasper Platz, who previously founded Gen110, Inc., a solar energy company funded by Kleiner Perkins Caufield & Byers, started Tally in 2015. Brown and Platz realized that since credit card annual percentage rates (APRs) are typically 15 to 20 percent and late fees are common, there was an opportunity to make credit cards "less expensive and easier to manage."

In June 2015, Tally received $2 million in seed funding led by Aileen Lee at Cowboy Ventures, with participation from Accelerate IT Ventures (AITV) and Sherpalo Ventures.

In May 2016, the company secured a $15 million Series A round led by Sean Flynn at Shasta Ventures, with participation from existing investors, as well as Silicon Valley Bank (Nasdaq: SIVB).

In July 2018, Tally announced it raised an additional $25 million in venture capital funding from Kleiner Perkins and existing investors Shasta Ventures, Cowboy Ventures and Sway Ventures.

== Features ==
Tally pays its users' credit card debt with a line of credit provided by the company. The user makes one monthly minimum payment to Tally. To determine eligibility, the user scans their credit cards through the app and agrees to a soft credit check. The new credit line is a revolving account and is available to customers with at least a 660 FICO credit score. Tally also offers the feature of sending payments automatically, so that users can pay their bills on time.
