= Jewel Burks Solomon =

American entrepreneur and venture capitalist

- Born: Jewel Melanie Burks; Nashville, Tennessee, U.S.
- Education: Howard University
- Occupations: Entrepreneur, venture capitalist
- Years active: 2009–present

Jewel Melanie Burks Solomon is an American tech entrepreneur and venture capitalist working as the first head of Google for Startups in the U.S. She is managing partner of the investment firm, Collab Capital, focusing on Black entrepreneurship. Burks Solomon was previously the Google entrepreneur in residence for diversity markets from January 2014 to October 2016.

== Early life ==
Jewel Burks Solomon is from Nashville, Tennessee. Her mother, Valinda Burks, ran an insurance agency for 25 years. Jewel Burks Solomon's father, William Burks, owned and managed real estate properties, convenience stores, and a laundromat. In the 1960s, her grandfather, Bill McDaniel, founded businesses in Mobile, Alabama. Burks Solomon began working at a young age for the family businesses.

She studied business at Howard University, graduating in 2010.

== Career ==
Burks Solomon began her career at Google in Mountain View, California as a BOLD intern the summer of 2009. She was a full time enterprise sales associate for Google Enterprise from 2010 to 2012.

Burks Solomon moved back to Atlanta after her grandmother's breast cancer diagnosis. She worked at McMaster-Carr as a customer service manager but noticed major technological deficiencies. This prompted Burks Solomon to cofound PartPic in 2013 with Jason Crain. The startup allowed people to use smartphones to search for parts using computer vision technology.

Burks Solomon served as the Google entrepreneur in residence for diversity markets from January 2014 to October 2016. PartPic was acquired by Amazon in 2016. Burks Solomon left Google to oversee the integration of PartPic's technology with the Amazon mobile app. The technology became Amazon PartFinder.

In January 2020, Burks Solomon became the first head of Google for Startups in the U.S.

Burks Solomon is managing partner of the investment firm, Collab Capital. The firm focuses on Black entrepreneurs.

== See also ==
- Women in venture capital
