= Fletcher Foundation =

American former non-profit foundation

The Fletcher Foundation was a nonprofit foundation that supported civil rights, education, and environmental education.

== History ==
The foundation supported efforts to develop a more just society with more equal opportunities for more of the population primarily by leveraging the financial and non-financial contributions of Fletcher Asset Management, the Fletcher Family including New York financier and philanthropist Alphonse "Buddy" Fletcher Jr. and others.

Fletcher Asset Management has been accused of fraud related to its management of funds and the value of pledges Fletcher's charitable pledges are in dispute. The Foundation lost its tax-exempt status in 2018.

A 1987 graduate of Harvard University, Fletcher worked in investment banking and in 1991 founded Fletcher Asset Management. A Harvard Class Marshal, Fletcher endowed a University Professorship at his alma mater, first held by philosopher Cornel West and now held by literary critic Henry Louis Gates Jr.

In 2004, in commemoration of the fiftieth anniversary of the landmark Supreme Court decision, Brown v. Board of Education, the Fletcher Foundation announced the creation of the Alphonse Fletcher Sr. Fellowship program, described by foundation chair Henry Louis Gates Jr. as "Guggenheims for race issues." The inaugural class of Fletcher Fellows, each awarded $50,000, was selected in 2006.

== Fletcher Fellows ==
- Elizabeth Alexander, poet and African-American studies professor, Yale University
- Devon Carbado, law professor at University of California, Los Angeles
- Kathleen Cleaver, author and former Black Panther Party activist
- Stanley Crouch, cultural critic and author
- Roland Fryer, economist and member of Harvard Society of Fellows
- Anita Hill, civil rights attorney and law professor Brandeis University
- Nina Jablonski, biological anthropologist and author of Skin
- Glenn Ligon, artist, New York
- Arthur Mitchell, founder of the Dance Theatre of Harlem
- Bob Moses, educator and civil rights leader
- Thomas Sugrue, civil rights historian and professor at University of Pennsylvania
- Deborah Willis, photographer and documentarian and professor at New York University
- Lawrence Bobo, race relations scholar and professor at Stanford University
- Fatimah L.C. Jackson, professor of anthropology, University of Maryland
- Randall Kennedy, professor of law, Harvard University
- Miranda Massie, civil rights attorney, Detroit, Michigan
- Lorna Simpson, artist, New York
- Anna Deavere Smith, performance artist, actress, and University Professor, New York University
- Valerie Smith, professor of English and director African-American Studies Program, Princeton University
- Margaret Beale Spencer, professor of education, University of Pennsylvania
- Brent Staples, award-winning journalist, The New York Times
- Patricia Sullivan, associate professor of history, University of South Carolina
- Loïc Wacquant, professor of sociology and boxer, University of California, Berkeley
- Hilton Als, journalist and literary critic
- Cheryl Finley, assistant professor of art history, Cornell University
- Joy A. James, professor of Africana Studies, Williams College
- Kenneth W. Mack, professor of law, Harvard University
- Charles Payne, professor of sociology and education, Duke University
- Clayborne Carson, professor of history, Stanford University
- Kimberlé Crenshaw, professor of law, UCLA and Columbia Law School
- Kellie Jones, associate professor of art history and archaeology, Columbia University
- Stacy L. Leeds, professor of law, University of Kansas
- Emily Bernard, associate professor of English, University of Vermont
- Rachel Devlin, associate professor of history, Tulane University
- Llewellyn M. Smith, filmmaker
- Keivan G. Stassun, associate professor of physics and astronomy, Vanderbilt University
- Mia Bay, associate professor of history, Rutgers University
- Richard Thompson Ford, professor of law, Stanford University
- Tyrone Forman, associate professor of sociology, Emory University
- Ian Haney-López, professor of law, University of California, Berkeley
- Sharon D. Raynor, associate professor of English, Johnson C. Smith University
- Daniel J. Sharfstein, associate professor of law, Vanderbilt University
- Rachel Swarns, correspondent, The New York Times
- Jonathan Holloway, professor of history and African American studies, Yale University
- Jane Dailey, associate professor in the Department of History, the College, and the Law School University of Chicago Law School, University of Chicago
- Trey Ellis, assistant professor at the School of the Arts, Columbia University School of the Arts, Columbia University
- Rucker Johnson, associate professor, Goldman School of Public Policy, University of California, Berkeley
