= Employment Law Alliance =

International law firm

- Abbreviation: ELA
- Headquarters: San Francisco, California, US
- Region served: 6 continents
- Members: More than 3,000 attorneys
- CEO: Stephen Hirschfeld
- Website: www.ela.law
- Remarks: Founded in 2000

The Employment Law Alliance (ELA) is an international law firm composed of management-side labor, employment and immigration lawyers, focused on employment law and immigration law related matters. Headquartered in San Francisco, ELA counts more than 3,000 lawyers in more than 100 nations, and all 50 U.S. states among its members.

== Founder ==
The organization was founded in 2000 by Stephen J. Hirschfeld, Esq., who currently serves as the organization's CEO. Hirschfeld was honored for his contributions to legal marketing with the 2011 Legal Marketing Association - Bay Area Chapter's Rella Lossy award. Hirschfeld was hired by venture capital firm Kleiner Perkins Caufield & Byers to evaluate gender issues raised by Ellen Pao. He also served as a witness in the Ellen Pao gender discrimination lawsuit.

== Polls ==
The Alliance has conducted periodic surveys on labor and employment issues. In April 2010, the Alliance produced a poll regarding outsourcing. In 2007, the Alliance conducted a poll regarding workplace bullying. In 2005, the Alliance conducted a poll regarding blogging in the workplace. In 2003, the Alliance conducted and published the results of a poll regarding workplace weight issues and accompanying Weight discrimination. The issue of sexual harassment in the workplace was examined in 2002.

== Partnership ==
In February 2011, it was announced that the World Bank had partnered with the ELA for the upcoming report and dataset "Women Business and the Law". The report, based on an international survey, details how the laws of each country affect women's abilities to secure employment and start a business. According to the project announcement, topics to be covered include and parental leave, retirement and pensions, flexible work and restrictions on working at night and in specific industries.

== See also ==
- Employment protection legislation
- American Society of International Law
