= Kenneth W. Mack =

American law professor (born 1964)

Kenneth W. Mack (born December 14, 1964) is an American historian and the inaugural Lawrence D. Biele Professor of Law at Harvard Law School, where he has been a member of the faculty since 2000. He is the author of Representing the Race: The Creation of the Civil Rights Lawyer (2012), and co-editor of The New Black: What Has Changed--and What Has Not--With Race in America (2012).

== Education and early career ==
Kenneth W. Mack grew up in Harrisburg, Pennsylvania, attended Harrisburg High School and graduated from Central Dauphin East High School in 1982. He enrolled at Drexel University, where he received his B.S. in electrical engineering in 1987, and was inducted into the Tau Beta Pi engineering honor society. He then worked as an electrical engineer for Bell Laboratories, where he did Integrated circuit design.

He left Bell Labs to enroll at Harvard Law School, where he earned a J.D., cum laude, in 1991. He served as Executive Editor (Bluebook) of the Harvard Law Review, when his classmate, Barack Obama, served as its president. Mack clerked for the Honorable Robert L. Carter, in the United States District Court for the Southern District of New York. After clerking, he worked in the Washington, D.C. office of Covington & Burling. In 1994, Mack left the practice of law to enter graduate school at Princeton University, where he received a master's degree in 1996, and a Ph.D. in 2005, both in history.

== Academic career ==
In 1999, Mack received an appointment as the Reginald F. Lewis Fellow at Harvard Law School. The following year he joined the Harvard law faculty as a professor. Mack's teaching and scholarship have focused on the legal and constitutional history of American race relations and economic life.

== Recognition ==
In 2007, he was awarded the Alphonse Fletcher Sr. Fellowship by the Fletcher Foundation.

In 2010, he was awarded an honorary Doctor of Public Service by Harrisburg University of Science and Technology.

== Books ==
- Representing the Race: The Creation of the Civil Rights Lawyer (2012)
- The New Black: What Has Changed -- and What Has Not -- with Race in America (2012)
