= Jeremy Kudon =

American lawyer and lobbyist

Jeremy Kudon is an American lawyer and lobbyist. He is a partner at the law firm Orrick, Herrington & Sutcliffe, where he founded and leads the firm's public policy practice. He is best known for designing and running the state-by-state lobbying campaigns that legalized daily fantasy sports and online sports betting on behalf of clients including FanDuel and DraftKings, and he has been a central figure in national press coverage of the sports-betting industry's expansion after the U.S. Supreme Court's 2018 decision in Murphy v. National Collegiate Athletic Association.

== Early life and education ==
Kudon grew up in Potomac, Maryland; his father was a plaintiff-side antitrust attorney who represented sports teams. He received a degree in history and political science from Miami University in Ohio in 1993 and then attended Boston University School of Law, from which he graduated summa cum laude in 2000.

== Career ==
Kudon began his legal career as a litigation associate at Davis Polk & Wardwell and Heller Ehrman. After Heller Ehrman dissolved, he moved to Orrick. He transitioned from litigation to state legislative and regulatory work through matters for the satellite-television providers Dish Network and DirecTV, for which he helped coordinate a multi-state campaign against cable-backed tax legislation.

=== Daily fantasy sports and sports betting ===
In 2014, Kudon began representing the daily fantasy sports operators FanDuel and DraftKings, persuading the two rivals to collaborate on a shared legislative strategy rather than compete for market share. According to The New York Times, "if you had to pick a moment when the campaign to convince states to legalize sports betting started taking shape," it was the day in 2014 when Kudon—then focused on helping young industries in state capitals—decided to pursue fantasy sports as his next issue. When the New York Attorney General issued cease-and-desist letters to FanDuel and DraftKings in 2015, Kudon led a successful effort to pass state legislation affirming the legality of paid daily fantasy contests.

After the Supreme Court struck down the federal ban on sports betting in Murphy v. NCAA (2018), Kudon led campaigns to legalize online sports betting across the country, and also came to represent professional sports leagues—including Major League Baseball, the NBA and the PGA Tour—that had previously opposed his operator clients. A 2022 New York Times investigation, part of its "A Risky Wager" series, documented how the industry secured favorable tax rates and light regulation in states such as Kansas, and featured Kudon prominently as an architect of the lobbying effort. His work on sports-betting legalization had earlier been the subject of a 2019 New York Times Magazine Sunday feature.

Kudon served as president of the Sports Betting Alliance. In 2025, when Joe Maloney was named the alliance's president and chief executive, Kudon became its chairman, continuing to oversee its legislative efforts nationwide.

=== Artificial intelligence policy ===
Kudon later became active in artificial intelligence policy as a leader of the American Innovators Network (AIN), a coalition representing technology start-ups—so-called "Little Tech"—that was launched in April 2025 with backing from the venture-capital firm Andreessen Horowitz and the start-up accelerator Y Combinator, among others. The coalition campaigns against state-level AI regulation that it argues would disadvantage smaller firms relative to large incumbents. Kudon was named the group's executive director as it expanded its membership and shifted toward a federal legislative strategy.

== Recognition ==
Kudon was named a Law360 "MVP" in the Sports & Betting category multiple times, including in 2016 and 2021.
