= Buddy Fletcher =

Former American hedge fund manager (born 1965)

- Born: Alphonse Fletcher Jr. 19 December 1965 (age 60); New London, Connecticut, United States
- Other name: Buddy
- Education: Harvard University; Yale University
- Occupations: Founder, Chairman, and CEO of Fletcher Asset Management; Founder of the Fletcher Foundation
- Employers: Bear Stearns (1987–??); Kidder Peabody (19??–91); Fletcher Asset Management (1991–present)
- Known for: Hedge fund management, fund bankruptcy, Kidder Peabody discrimination lawsuit, Dakota discrimination lawsuit, Philanthropy
- Spouse: Ellen Pao (m. 2007; sep. 2019)
- Children: 1
- Relatives: Geoffrey S. Fletcher (brother)

Alphonse "Buddy" Fletcher Jr. (born December 19, 1965) is an American former hedge fund manager and founder of the Fletcher Foundation. He began his career as a quantitative equity trader at Bear Stearns and later worked at Kidder, Peabody & Co. Fletcher, who is African American, sued Kidder Peabody for racial discrimination. Although his racial discrimination claims were dismissed, he eventually won an arbitration award of $1.26 million. Fletcher has also been involved in litigation centered on a dispute with the board of The Dakota apartment building in New York City.

Fletcher founded Fletcher Asset Management in 1991. His main fund, Fletcher International, may have been insolvent since 2008 and was declared bankrupt in 2012.

== Early life and education ==
Fletcher was raised in Waterford, Connecticut. His father, Alphonse Sr., was a technician at the Electric Boat Corporation in Groton, a company that makes submarines. His mother, Bettye, a long-time teacher and later a social worker, dean, and school principal, received a PhD in Education from Teachers College, Columbia University. Fletcher has two younger brothers, Todd, and Geoffrey, a screenwriter, film director and Academy Award winner.

He attended Harvard College, where he received an A.B. degree as an applied mathematics major in 1987. He was elected first marshall of the 1987 class. He earned a master's degree in environmental management from the Yale School of Forestry and Environmental Studies in 2004.

== Career ==
After graduating from Harvard College in 1987, Fletcher began his career at Bear Stearns as a quantitative equity trader who capitalized on dividend-related arbitrage. He was recruited to Kidder Peabody as a trader in the equity trading group.

=== Fletcher Asset Management ===
After his tenure at Kidder Peabody, he founded Fletcher Asset Management, which makes private investments in small-capitalization public companies.

During Fletcher Asset Management's first four years, it traded with heavy leverage. His general strategy was trading public instruments for his own account and on behalf of clients, but he also made longer-term equity investments. He used hedges with both types of investments. He has also been involved in PIPE deals. At one time, his firm's trading activity occasionally accounted for 5% of the volume on the New York Stock Exchange. In 1994, Fletcher surrendered his broker-dealer registration and became a registered investment adviser, which made managing money more convenient.

=== Fund bankruptcy ===
In July 2011, FIA Leveraged Fund, an investment vehicle managed by Fletcher Asset Management, was unable to meet a redemption request, totaling $144 million, by three Louisiana pension fund investors. In April 2012, the Grand Court of the Cayman Islands ruled that the fund was insolvent and ordered that it be "wound up" (liquidated).

In June 2012, Fletcher International Ltd., the Bermuda-based "master fund" for the Fletcher funds, filed for Chapter 11 bankruptcy in Manhattan.

== Litigation ==
=== Alphonse Fletcher v. Kidder Peabody ===
In 1991, after working as an equity trader at Kidder Peabody, Fletcher filed a lawsuit in New York state court for employment racial discrimination. The New York Court of Appeals ruled that Fletcher's claim must be arbitrated. In a NYSE arbitration, Fletcher was awarded $1.26 million, and in a subsequent arbitration, the racial discrimination claim was dismissed.

=== Dakota lawsuit ===
In February 2011, Fletcher filed a lawsuit against the Board of Directors of The Dakota co-op building in Manhattan, where he had lived since 1992 and owned four apartments. Among other things, he alleged defamation and unlawful discrimination. In March 2010, Fletcher had signed a contract to purchase a fifth apartment at The Dakota, intending to combine it with his current home. The Dakota's board said that it rejected Fletcher's application based on the financial materials he provided in his application. Judge Eileen A. Rakower granted The Dakota's motion for summary judgment and dismissed the suit in September 2015. Fletcher announced his intention to appeal.

=== Federal tax lien ===
On May 29, 2013, The Wall Street Journal reported that the Internal Revenue Service had filed a $1.4 million income-tax lien against Fletcher.

== Fletcher Foundation and philanthropy ==
In 1993, following the death of friend and advisor Reginald Lewis, Fletcher donated $1 million to the Reginald F. Lewis Memorial Endowment. The endowment had been created by the National Association for the Advancement of Colored People after Lewis instructed his wife to bequeath $2 million to the organization.

In 1996, to commemorate the 100th anniversary of Plessy v. Ferguson, 163 U.S. 537 (1896), Fletcher endowed a University professorship at Harvard College.

In 2004, Fletcher created the Alphonse Fletcher University Professor Fellowship program to financially support professors working to improve race relations at Harvard. Funded as part of the Fletcher Foundation, Henry Louis Gates Jr. is the Alphonse Fletcher University Professor at Harvard.

== Sexual harassment allegations ==
Michael Meade, an employee at Fletcher Asset Management, sued Fletcher in 1995 over their deal to split profits. During the lawsuit, Meade alleged that Fletcher fired him after Meade rejected his sexual advances. Fletcher denied the accusation, and they later reached a confidential settlement.

In 2003 and 2006, two male caretakers who had worked for Fletcher accused him of sexual harassment. Fletcher denied the allegations. Both men reportedly received confidential settlements.

== Personal life ==
In December 2007, Fletcher married Ellen Pao, then a junior partner at venture capital firm Kleiner Perkins, in San Francisco. Fletcher and Pao met earlier in 2007 while Aspen Institute fellows. They have a daughter together, born in July 2008. Prior to his marriage to Pao, Fletcher was in a relationship with Hobart V. "Bo" Fowlkes Jr. for more than 10 years. Fowlkes is the godfather to Fletcher's daughter.

Fletcher and his wife have lived in the St. Regis Residence in San Francisco. Fletcher also owns homes in The Dakota in New York City.

As of 2019, he and Pao were in the process of divorcing.
