= Hong v. Facebook, Inc. =

2015 discrimination lawsuit

Hong v. Facebook Inc., Anil Wilson, et al. was a gender discrimination and race discrimination lawsuit filed in 2015 by Chia Hong against her former employer, Facebook, her supervisor, and 50 others. The lawsuit was filed in San Mateo County Superior Court by attorneys Lawless & Lawless.

Hong worked for Facebook over three years as a product manager and technology partner in finance. She was fired in October 2013. On March 16, 2015, she filed a suit against the company, alleging sexual discrimination, sexual harassment, race discrimination and intentional infliction of emotional distress among other charges. She claimed Facebook was a hostile work environment, and that she was belittled and ordered to organize social functions and serve drinks to male colleagues. She also claimed to have been asked why she did not take care of her child. Hong, a Taiwanese American, alleged that she was excluded by coworkers because she was the only team member of Chinese descent.

A Facebook spokesperson released a statement in response to the filing: "We work extremely hard on issues related to diversity, gender and equality, and we believe we've made progress. (...) In this case we have substantive disagreements on the facts, and we believe the record shows the employee was treated fairly."

The parties stipulated to voluntary mediation before a court-related mediator. The mediation session was scheduled for August 31, 2015. After the mediation, the case was voluntarily dismissed by Hong on October 2, 2015. Attorneys for Hong stated that the matter had been "resolved"; it is not known whether there was a settlement.

== See also ==
- Pao v. Kleiner Perkins
