= Aileen Lee =

American investor

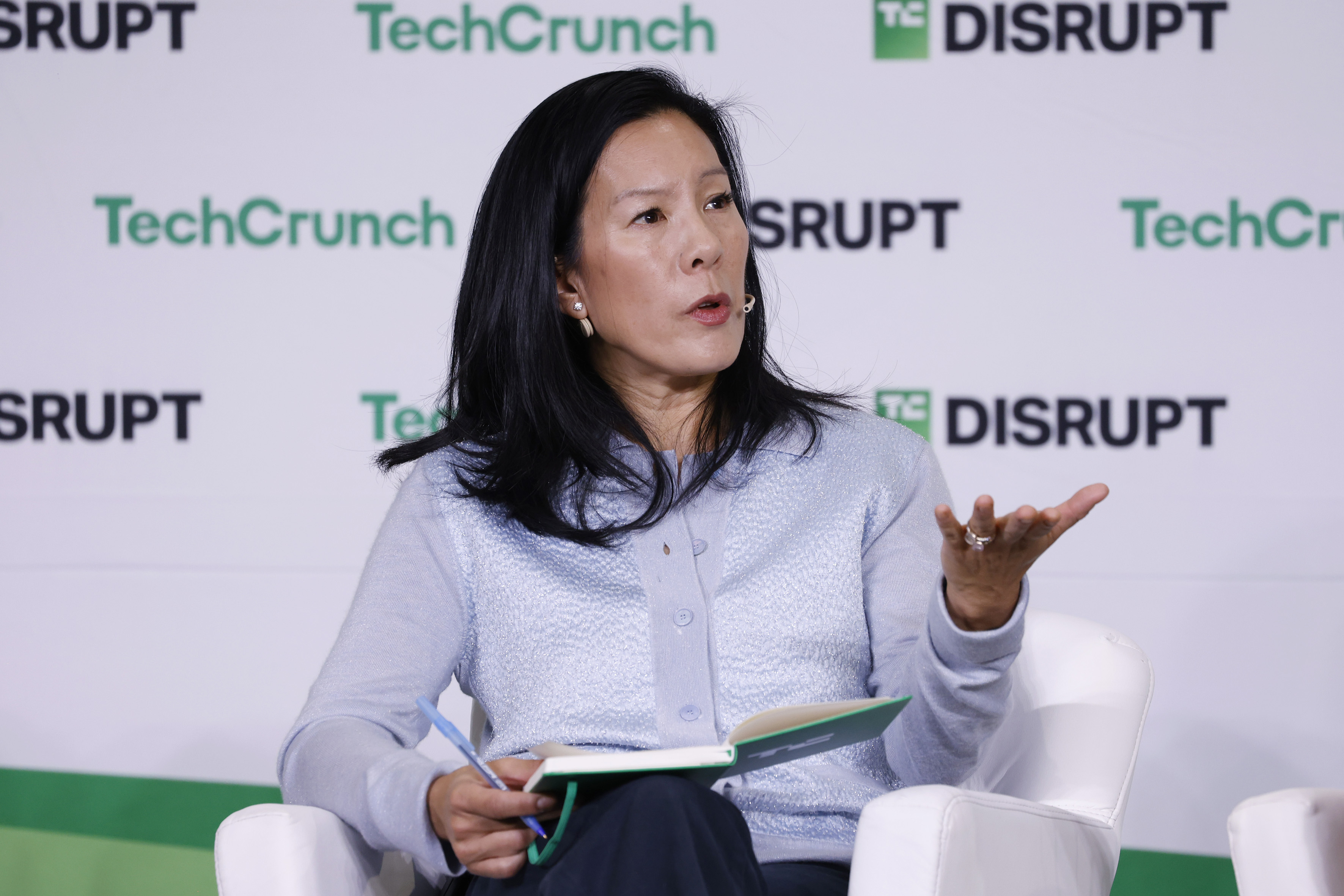
- Aileen Lee in 2025
- Born: 1970 (age 55–56); New York City, U.S.
- Education: Massachusetts Institute of Technology; Harvard Business School
- Occupation: Venture capitalist
- Known for: Co-founder and managing partner of Cowboy Ventures

Aileen Lee (born 1970) is an American venture capitalist, angel investor and co-founder of Cowboy Ventures. Previously a partner at Kleiner Perkins, she is best known for coining the term "unicorn" in a 2013 TechCrunch article to describe privately held startup companies valued at more than $1 billion. Lee has invested in numerous early-stage technology companies and co-founded All Raise, a nonprofit organization that works to increase the representation of women in venture capital.

== Early life and education ==
Raised in Millburn, New Jersey and the daughter of Chinese immigrants, Lee graduated in 1988 from Millburn High School, where she was senior class president.

Lee earned her bachelor's degree from the MIT Sloan School of Management in 1992. After MIT, she worked as a financial analyst for two years at Morgan Stanley. She earned her MBA from Harvard Business School in 1997.

== Career ==
Lee joined Kleiner Perkins (KPCB) in 1999 and was the founding CEO of RMG Networks, a company backed by KPCB. Lee worked at Kleiner Perkins for 13 years and left in 2012.

In 2012, she left KPCB to start seed-stage venture firm Cowboy Ventures. Cowboy Ventures is one of the first female-led venture capital firms. In its first six years, Cowboy Ventures has received three large funds, the latest reaching $95 million.

Through Cowboy Ventures, Lee has made investments in many early-stage companies, including August, Dollar Shave Club, Textio, Accompany and Tally Technologies. She is a public advocate of increasing the number of female founders and investors in the Silicon Valley.

In 2013, Lee coined the often-used Silicon Valley term unicorn in a TechCrunch article "Welcome To The Unicorn Club: Learning from Billion-Dollar Startups" as profiled in The New York Times. A unicorn is generally defined as a privately held startup that has a $1 billion valuation or more, making it rare like a unicorn.

In 2017, Lee added Ted Wang to Cowboy Ventures as a general partner.

== Philanthropy ==
In 2018, Lee co-founded All Raise, a nonprofit organization which seeks to increase the amount of funding that female investors receive. The organization was founded as a collective by more than 30 venture capitalists who advocate for increasing the presence of women in venture capital. Lee described the organization's importance in saying “We believe that by improving the success of women in the venture-backed tech ecosystem, we can build a more accessible community that reflects the diversity of the world around us.”

== Awards and recognition ==
Lee was invited to speak at the 2018 Code Conference put on by Recode and additionally at the 2018 GeekWire Summit. She has spoke at the 2019 Silicon Slopes Tech Summit, and has been a speaker for other organizations such as Lesbians Who Tech and the Female Founders Conference.

Lee has appeared on Forbes' list of The World's 100 Most Powerful Women (position #97 as of 2020) and the Midas List in 2020 (position #80), 2019 (position #82), and 2018 (position #97). She also appeared on Time's list of 100 Most Influential People in 2019.

== Personal life ==
Aileen Lee is married and has three children.
