= Orrick, Herrington & Sutcliffe =

American international law firm

Orrick, Herrington & Sutcliffe LLP
- Headquarters: San Francisco, California, United States
- No. of offices: 25+
- No. of attorneys: 1,000+
- Major practice areas: Technology and innovation, energy and infrastructure, finance, life sciences, health technology
- Key people: Mitch Zuklie, chairman
- Revenue: ▲$1.78 billion (2025)
- Date founded: 1863
- Company type: Limited liability partnership
- Website: orrick.com

Orrick, Herrington & Sutcliffe, known as Orrick, is a law firm primarily focused on the technology, energy, infrastructure, finance, life sciences, and health tech sectors. It was founded in 1863 in San Francisco, California, where it is headquartered, and operates over 25 offices in the United States, Europe, and Asia.

== History ==
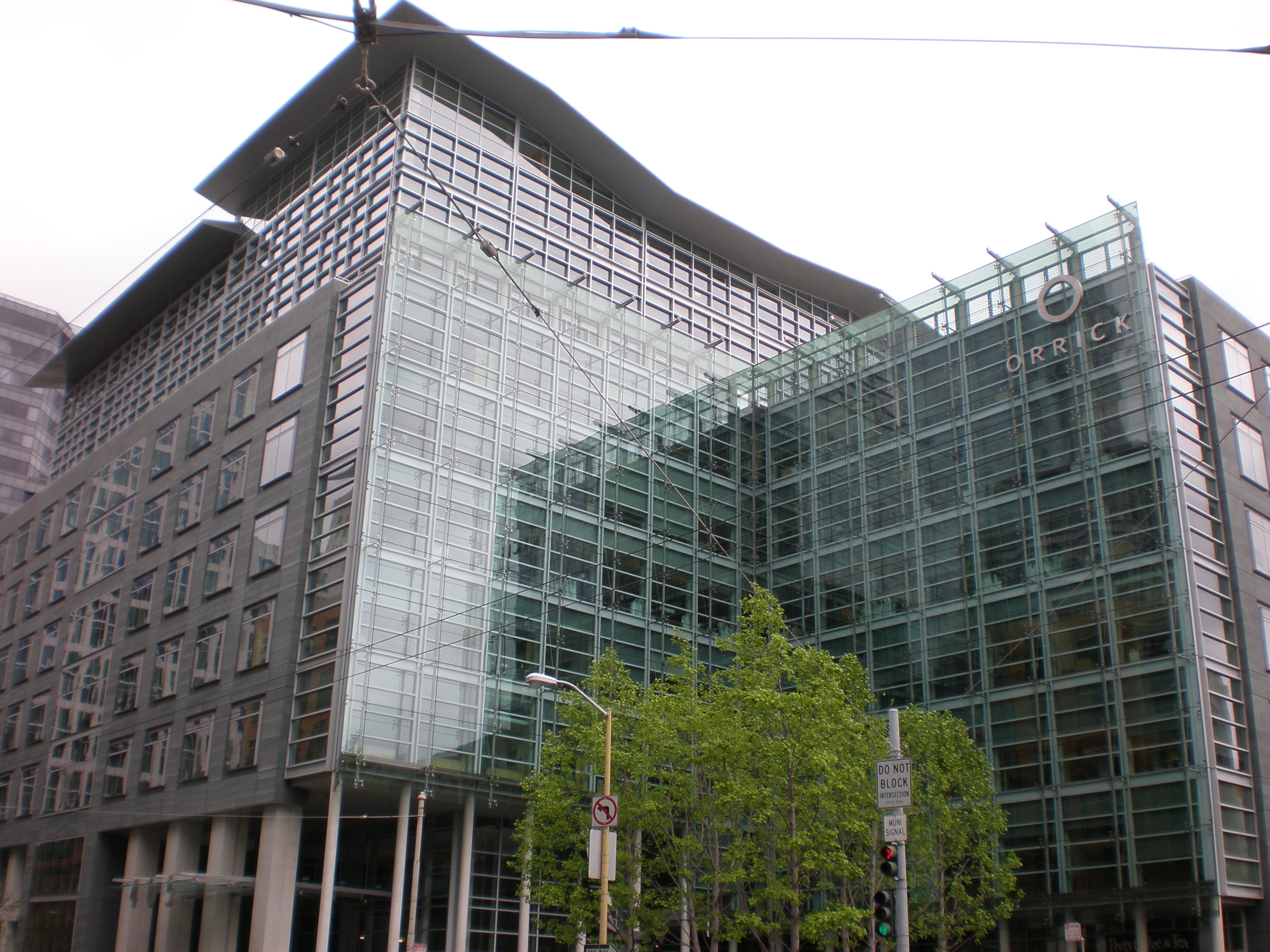
Orrick's headquarters at the Orrick Building on Howard Street in San Francisco

=== Founding and expansion ===
The firm traces its origins to the 1863 organization of the German Savings and Loan Society (later joined to First Interstate Bank of California), with John R. Jarboe as general counsel. Jarboe and partners W.S. Goodfellow and Ralph C. Harrison later dissolved the San Francisco firm, Jarboe, Harrison & Goodfellow in 1891, following Harrison's election as justice to the California Supreme Court. Jarboe died two years later at age 57. Goodfellow subsequently joined Charles Eells to form Goodfellow & Eells. Eells helped organize the Fireman's Fund Insurance Company, in the aftermath of the San Francisco earthquake and fire of 1906. William H. Orrick joined the firm in 1910, followed by George Herrington and Eric Sutcliffe.

Orrick's earliest work included funding the Golden Gate Bridge construction; shaping the California Corporate Securities Act; the first offerings under the Securities Act of 1933; and litigating over hydroelectric power and water development rights in the Lake Tahoe region.

In the 1980s, the firm expanded outside of the Bay Area, establishing offices in New York City and Los Angeles.

After establishing an outpost in Singapore in 1996, the firm opened an office there in 2001, but closed it in 2003, attributed to a poor economy in Southeast Asia; In 2021, Orrick again established an office in Singapore. The firm opened a Tokyo office in 1997 and a London practice in 1998.

Orrick acquired 40 lawyers and their litigation practices from Donovan, Leisure, Newton & Irvine in 1998.

=== 21st century ===
In 2013, Mitch Zuklie, a Silicon Valley tech lawyer, assumed the role of the firm's chairman and CEO. The same year, Orrick was the first global law firm to establish an Impact Finance & Social Enterprise practice.

On Veterans Day in 2014, the firm announced the 2015 launch of its Veterans' Legal Career Fair, to match employers with lawyers who are veterans, active-duty service members, or military spouses. The annual event has run since 2015 and has been attended by over 800 active-duty members.

In 2018, Orrick started a legal tech investment initiative.

In 2022, Orrick, Herrington & Sutcliffe was a founding member of the Legal Alliance for Reproductive Rights, a coalition of United States law firms offering free legal services to people seeking and providing abortions in the wake of Dobbs v. Jackson Women's Health Organization, which overruled Roe v. Wade.

In 2023, it launched Orrick Tech Studio, a free technology startup website.

In 2024, the firm launched an AI Law Center, with a free state AI law tracker and a guide to the EU AI Act, as well as the Orrick Online Safety Law Center, for clients to monitor related online safety, privacy, and harmful content laws.

== Offices, acquisitions and mergers ==
A Paris office was opened in 2002, along with its Global Operations & Innovation Center in Wheeling, West Virginia.

In 2003, the firm added a team from the Venture Law Group. In 2005, Orrick expanded its London office and opened offices in Hong Kong, Beijing, and Shanghai with alumni of subsequently defunct law firm Coudert Brothers.

In 2006, the firm engaged in merger negotiations with legacy Wall Street firm Dewey Ballantine; the proposed merger was unsuccessful. The same year, Orrick expanded its Paris office through a combination with Rambaud Martel, a French firm.

In 2008, Orrick expanded into Germany by combining with Hölters & Elsing (Partnerschaft von Rechtsanwälten); establishing offices in Düsseldorf and Munich. That year, the firm admitted almost two dozen partners in its London, New York, San Francisco, Seattle, and Washington, D.C., offices from the San Francisco firm Heller Ehrman, including 27 hired after Heller's September 26, 2008, announcement of dissolution.

In 2023, Orrick merged with AmLaw 200 Buckley, doubled the firm's size in Washington, D.C., expanding its financial regulation, enforcement, and litigation practices, and its services to consumer banks, and global fintechs.

In 2025, Orrick hired a 13-lawyer tech company and venture capital team from Gunderson Dettmer in Los Angeles.

During 2015 to 2025, Orrick also established offices in Geneva, (2015–2025); Houston in 2016, Austin in 2018, Boston in 2019, Singapore in 2021, and Miami in 2025.

In 2025, the firm was joined by 37 lawyers from rival firm Cadwalader, Wickersham & Taft, including 10 new partners in its Washington, D.C., Charlotte and London offices.

== Legal representation ==
Orrick acquired asylum for three members of the Albanian Demiraj family from the U.S. Supreme Court in 2012.

The firm worked on the legislation enacted in California in October 2017 to criminalize sexual extortion, part of a national effort on behalf of pro bono client Legal Momentum.

Orrick lawyers provided legal and technical assistance to the Public International Law & Policy Group on issues related to countries in the Middle East, including Egypt, Libya, Syria, and Tunisia.

Orrick has advised Stripe, Inc. and Anthropic on VC financings. In 2024, the firm advised Microsoft on signing an agreement with Constellation Energy to reopen Three Mile Island, a nuclear facility in Pennsylvania, to serve the company's data center operations.

The firm has advised the City of New York on multi-year infrastructure projects, including a $13 billion project to replace Rikers Island with community-based jails and the Hudson Tunnel, a key part of the $30 billion Gateway Development rail project.

Orrick represented Sonos in multiple patent litigation cases against Google, including a 2022 ITC ruling that found Google infringed five Sonos patents and barred the importation of certain Google smart speakers.

In 2022, Orrick secured a New York Court of Appeals reversal for Credit Suisse in a mortgage-backed securities case.

Orrick represented UBS Asset Management and certain funds in a bankruptcy dispute in 2024, in which the judge ruled that UBS was owed more than $100 million under various loan agreements.

In 2024, Orrick prevailed in the Court's overturning of a $2 billion trade secrets verdict for Pegasystems, with the Virginia Court of Appeals ordering a new trial due to jury errors, reversing the largest damages verdict in the state's history.

In 2025, the firm represented Intersect Power on an $800 million investment and partnership with Google and TPG Rise Climate to provide energy and storage to new data centers. In 2026, Orrick advised on Intersect's $4,75 billion acquisition by Alphabet.

Orrick secured a reversal before the California Supreme Court for Gilead Sciences and other innovators in 2026, rebuffing a "duty to innovate" theory that would have expanded product liability law.

== Recognition and rankings ==
The Financial Times, between 2016 and 2025, named Orrick among North America's most innovative law firms.

Fortune has named Orrick one of its 100 Best Companies to Work For several times.

In 2024, The American Lawyer named Orrick among the top five firms on its "A-List".

In 2024, Law360 named the firm its Tech Group of the Year and Construction Group of the Year.

The National Law Journal named Orrick to its Appellate Hot List in 2024.

Global Arbitration Review (GAR) included Orrick in its 2024 list of the world's top 30 international arbitration practices.

The Bond Buyer ranked Orrick #1 bond counsel in 2024.

Orrick was named one of the "50 Best Law Firms for Women" by Working Mother magazine in 2017.

Minority Corporate Counsel Association (MCCA) awarded Orrick with the 2020 Thomas L. Sager Award.

Yale Law Women ranked Orrick the top firm for Diversity in its Top Firms Report 2024, and Diversity Lab named Orrick a Mansfield Certified firm in 2024.

Orrick earned a score of 100 percent in the 2025 Human Rights Campaign's annual Corporate Equality Index (CEI) and Best Places to Work survey.

== Notable lawyers and alumni ==
- Charles C. Adams Jr., United States Ambassador to Finland (2015–2017)
- Keily Blair, CEO of OnlyFans; formerly led the firm's London cyber, privacy and data practice (2020–2023), with clients including OnlyFans
- Wei Christianson, CEO of China and Co-CEO of Asia Pacific at Morgan Stanley
- Charity Clark, Vermont Attorney General
- Lynne Hermle, employment law attorney
- Eric Johnson, Mayor of Dallas (2019–present)
- Jeremy Kudon, chairman of the Sports Betting Alliance and executive director of the American Innovators Network (AIN)
- Sergey Lagodinsky, Member of the European Parliament for Germany (2019–present)
- Sean Patrick Maloney, U.S. Representative for New York's 18th congressional district (2013–2023)
- Rob McKenna, Attorney General of Washington (2005–2013)
- Brian T. Moran, United States Attorney for the Western District of Washington (2019–2021)
- Kimberly J. Mueller, Judge of the United States District Court for the Eastern District of California (2010–present)
- Raul Anthony Ramirez, Judge of the United States District Court for the Eastern District of California (1980–1989)
- McGregor W. Scott, United States Attorney for the Eastern District of California (2003–2009; 2017–2021)
