= Google for Startups =

Startup program by Google

- Area served: Worldwide
- Owner: Google
- Key people: Agnieszka Hryniewicz-Bieniek; Jewel Burks Solomon
- Website: startup.google.com
- Launched: 2011

Google for Startups (formerly known as Google for Entrepreneurs) is a startup program launched by Google in 2011. It consists of over 50 co-working spaces and accelerators in 125 countries, and provides hands-on lessons for aspiring entrepreneurs.

It partners with local startup communities as well as a network of co-working spaces popularly known as Google Campus (not to be confused with Googleplex) for tech startup entrepreneurs. It offers access to Google's devices as well as tools and workshops for the local tech community. Google has claimed that the startups in its Campuses have raised over $250 million and created more than 4600 new jobs.

== History ==
In March 2012, Campus London was first launched in East London, followed by Campus Tel Aviv later in December 2012. The first Asian Campus was opened in Seoul, South Korea in 2015. The first South American Campus was subsequently launched in 2016 in Sāo Paulo, Brazil.

Events held in the various Campuses differ by location, including the language used in these events. Entrepreneurs or companies can apply to host these events, and they include workshops and conferences on tech topics such as blockchain, Internet of Things, fintech, machine learning, and cloud computing as well as other important practical skills for entrepreneurs such as digital marketing, product management, and intellectual rights. Other events include hackathons as well as startup residency programs for entrepreneurs and even free yoga and mindfulness sessions for entrepreneurs.

From time to time, Google employees are deployed to conduct workshops (such as sales training, technical discussions, pioneering philosophical thought experiments) as well as conferences with Google-related products and platforms such as the Google Cloud Platform.

In October 2018, Google for Entrepreneurs was renamed as Google for Startups. During the coronavirus pandemic, Google has decided not to reopen its East London campus likely due to the shift of working from home in June 2021.

== Locations ==
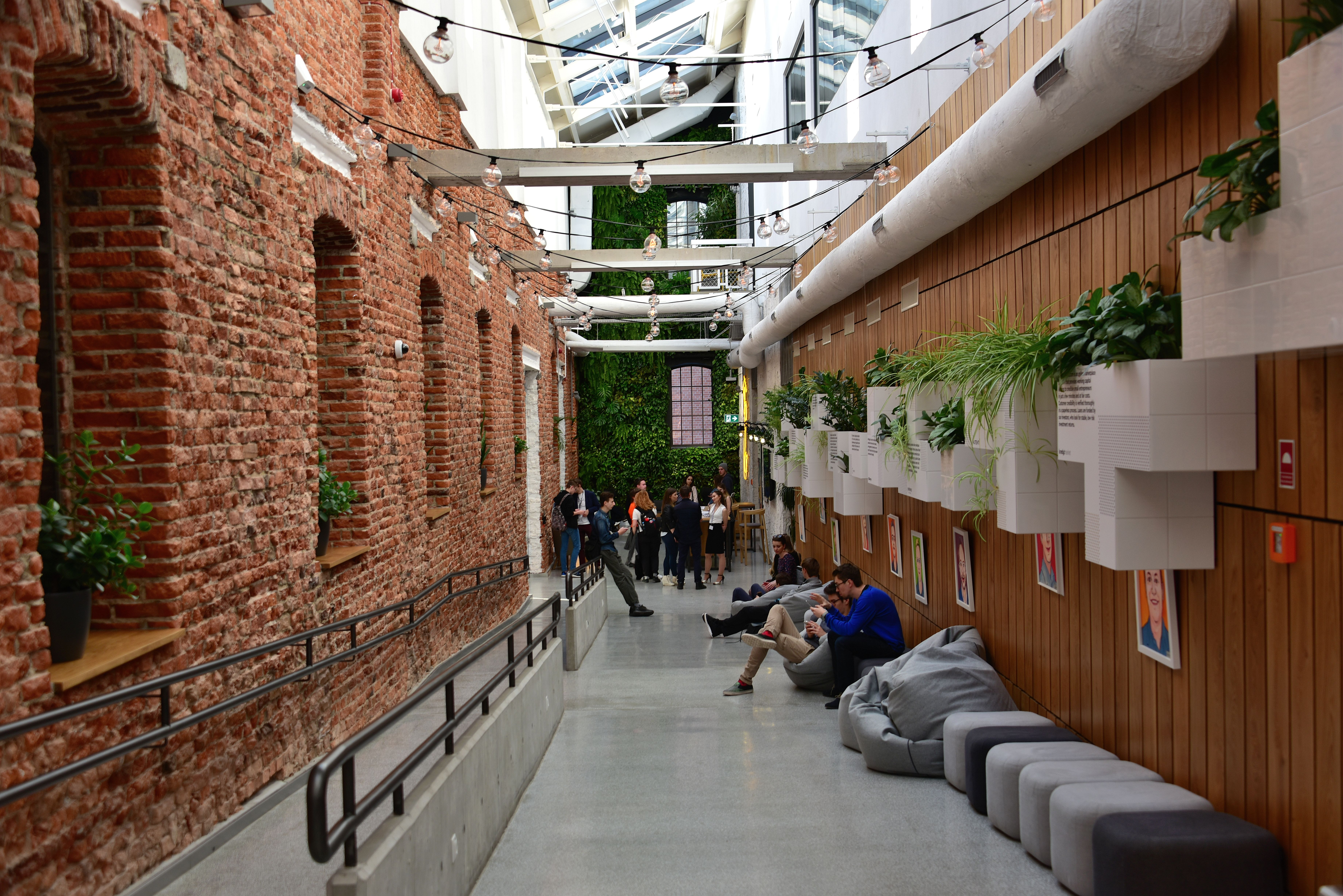
A corridor in Campus Warsaw located on the premises of the 19th-century former Warsaw Vodka Factory "Koneser".

As of 2019, its Campuses are located in 7 different cities spanning across Europe, Asia, and South America:

- Campus Tel Aviv
- Campus Madrid
- Campus Seoul
- Campus Warsaw
- Campus Sāo Paulo
- Campus Tokyo

== Campus Berlin ==
In 2017, another Campus location was planned to be launched in the neighborhood of Kreuzberg in Berlin, Germany. This led to concerns from local residents on the gentrification of the area. This issue has further escalated in September 2018 when protestors from Berlin-based "occupy" group temporarily occupied the building site and where at least six people were arrested according to eyewitness reports.

Some have criticized that Campus has led to too many light app startups instead of truly disruptive ones. Other criticisms include Google utilizing its Campuses for its marketing purposes rather than truly developing the startup community.

In October 2018, Google dropped plans to open its Berlin campus after pressure by local campaigners and stated that the site would now belong to two local charities.
