= Ellen Pao =

American businesswoman (born 1970)

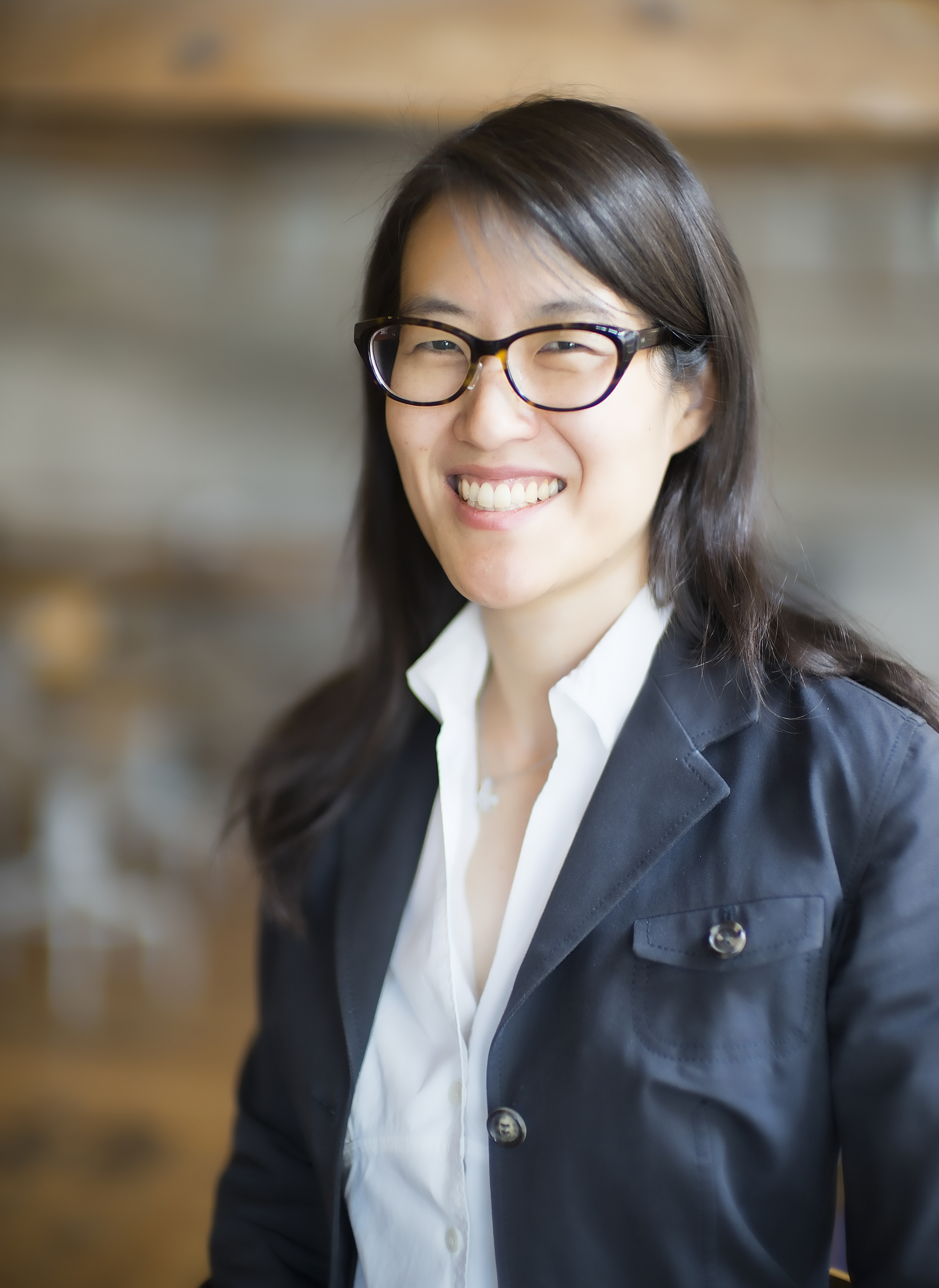
- Pao in 2015
- Born: 1970 (age 55–56); New Jersey, U.S.
- Education: Princeton University (BA); Harvard University (JD, MBA)
- Occupations: Attorney; business executive
- Spouses: Roger Kuo (divorced); Buddy Fletcher (m. 2007; sep. 2019)
- Children: 1 (with Fletcher)

Chinese name
- Traditional Chinese: 鮑康如
- Simplified Chinese: 鲍康如
Transcriptions
Standard Mandarin
- Hanyu Pinyin: Bào Kāngrú
- Website: ellenkpao.com

Ellen Kangru Pao (Chinese: 鮑康如; born 1970) is an American lawyer and businesswoman who was the chief executive officer (CEO) of the social media company Reddit from 2014 to 2015. Since 2016, she has been the cofounder and CEO of the nonprofit diversity consulting organization Project Include.

Pao first became known in 2012 for filing a gender discrimination lawsuit against her employer, venture capital firm Kleiner Perkins, and has continued to express vocal criticism of the hiring and promotion practices in Silicon Valley.

In 2014, she became interim CEO of Reddit. During this period, the site banned revenge porn, with other social media sites following suit. In 2015, decisions made by the company during her tenure, such as the banning of controversial Reddit communities for harassment, generated a wave of controversy that culminated in her stepping down. The backlash she received sparked debates both on the treatment of women in technology and the need for transparency in a company that relies on volunteers.

== Early life and education ==
Ellen Pao was born to a Taiwanese American family in 1970 in New Jersey. She is the middle child of three daughters born to Tsyh-Wen Lee and Young-Ping Pao, immigrants from Taiwan. Her father, Young-Ping Pao, was a professor at New York University's Courant Institute of Mathematical Sciences. Her mother, Tsyh-Wen Pao (née Lee) worked as an engineer in computer sciences at the University of Pennsylvania. Pao is fluent in English and Mandarin and first learned to code from her mother at age ten. The Pao family raised their children in Maplewood, New Jersey, where she graduated in 1987 from Columbia High School. Young-Ping Pao died in 1987, during Ellen's final year of high school.

Pao's maternal grandparents are Yu-Wen Lee and Ching-Hsin Lee (née Liu), who were Taiwanese waishengren from Baoding in Hebei province near Beijing. Pao's maternal grandfather was a graduate of the Republic of China Military Academy who served as a commander in the Chinese Civil War under Chiang Kai-shek. In 1948, he moved the family to Taiwan, where he retired with the rank of colonel in 1960. In October 1972, his wife and daughter Elizabeth moved to the New York City area to join Pao's mother, aunt, and uncle who were already studying in the U.S.

In 1991, Pao graduated from Princeton University, where she earned a Bachelor of Arts from the Woodrow Wilson School of Public and International Affairs after completing a 143-page senior thesis titled "Computer Databases and Business: An Analysis of Informational Privacy." As an undergraduate at Princeton, she served as the managing editor for The Daily Princetonian. She then attended Harvard Law School, where she earned a Juris Doctor (J.D.) in 1994. After two years of working, Pao earned a Master of Business Administration (M.B.A.) from Harvard Business School in 1998.

== Career ==
From 1994 to 1996, Pao worked as a corporate attorney at Cravath, Swaine & Moore. In 1998, Pao worked at WebTV. Pao worked at several companies in Silicon Valley including BEA Systems as Senior Director of Corporate Business Development from 2001 until 2005.

In 2005, Pao joined Kleiner Perkins, an established venture capital firm in San Francisco, as technical chief of staff for John Doerr, a senior partner, a job that required degrees in engineering, law, and business and experience in enterprise software. In 2007 she was appointed a Crown Fellow of the Aspen Institute on the recommendation of Doerr, a trustee. Also in 2007, she became a junior investing partner with Ted Schlein as her boss. While at Kleiner Perkins, Pao led the company's expansion into China. After several years with Schlein's team, Pao was passed over for a senior partner position. According to Pao, she had the job title of a junior partner from her date of hiring and was promised an opportunity to move into an investing role. Doerr, who has expressed awareness of what he considers a gender gap at venture capital firms, mentored Pao, liberally providing feedback, but, in the end, agreed with the other senior partners who had made negative evaluations of her work at the firm. It was Pao's contention in her suit for gender discrimination that men with similar profiles were, nevertheless, promoted.

On May 10, 2012, Pao filed a gender discrimination lawsuit against her employer. The lawsuit alleged workplace retaliation by a male junior partner, resulting from his and Pao's romantic affair. She continued to work at the firm until October 1. Pao claimed that she was terminated abruptly while Kleiner Perkins claimed that she was given a month to accept a paid five-month transition to an operating role. Pao's lawyer said she was fired in retaliation for her lawsuit and amended the complaint to add that cause of action. The firm said Pao was terminated for performance reasons unrelated to the lawsuit. On March 27, 2015, a jury decided the case in favor of the company on all counts.

Pao joined Reddit in 2013 as the head of business development and strategic partnerships. One of her first investments made in this capacity strengthened the ties between Reddit and its de facto image host Imgur. She stated that a goal for the following year was making it easier for people to become Redditors. Pao became interim CEO in November 2014 after Yishan Wong resigned. Following efforts by Wong to scale back salary negotiation during the hiring process, Pao decided to give two final offers (one with more cash, one with more equity) to all prospective employees. As motivation for the change, she cited findings that women were more likely to be penalized for attempting to negotiate pay. After seeing that Reddit's previous offers were not correlated with gender, Pao stated that the new policy was still the fairest, as well as a stepping stone to having publicly posted salaries. One of the largest changes made under Pao was the banning of revenge porn in March 2015. Other social networks that removed such images in the following months were widely referred to as following Reddit's model. In June and July 2015, Pao was the subject of criticism and harassment by Reddit users after five Reddit communities (subreddits) were banned for harassment and Reddit's director of talent was fired. A Change.org petition requesting her removal reached 200,000 signatures and on July 10, it was announced that Pao had resigned from Reddit "by mutual agreement".

Pao subsequently founded the nonprofit Project Include with Erica Baker, Tracy Chou, Freada Kapor Klein and four other women in the technology industry. Aimed at startups with 25 to 1,000 employees, the group develops human resources advice in a series of meetings with clients and publishes anonymized progress reports under a Creative Commons license. Reports on the aftermath of Pao v. Kleiner Perkins included speculation that Pao had agreed not to write a book detailing her experiences at the company. In November 2015, Pao revealed that this was not the case and later confirmed that she was writing a memoir. In a May 2016 interview, Pao stated that she planned to finish the book before seeking a full-time job. One month later, the book was acquired by Spiegel and Grau and given the title Reset: My Fight for Inclusion and Lasting Change. The book was shortlisted for the 2017 Financial Times and McKinsey Business Book of the Year Award.

In 2017, she became a partner at Kapor Capital and the Chief Diversity and Inclusion Officer at the Kapor Center for Social Impact before leaving in 2018 to focus on her role as Project Include's CEO.

== Gender discrimination lawsuit ==
On May 10, 2012, Pao filed a gender discrimination suit against Kleiner Perkins which went to trial in late February 2015. It was covered by the national media and elicited broad comment regarding the issues raised. The case was live blogged and tweeted constantly, to the point of providing both humorous and serious feedback to lawyers and witnesses. The trial, lasting 24 days, resulted in a favorable verdict for Kleiner Perkins.

While the trial was taking place, a gender discrimination suit was filed against Twitter by Tina Huang, alleging that the company unlawfully favored men in the promotion process and a suit alleging sexual and racial discrimination was filed against Facebook by Chia Hong. Law professor Joan Williams commented that it would have been "quite a coincidence" if these actions were not influenced by Pao's suit. More broadly, employment lawyers described an increase in the number of women coming forward with claims of gender inequality and the term Pao effect was coined to describe the resulting increase in lawsuits. Though many reporters commented positively on the changing culture, some expressed a foreboding that companies would be less likely to hire women during a period of abundant legal action. Discussion of the trial's influence continued after its conclusion when a discrimination claim was made by Microsoft researcher Katie Moussouris.

Following the trial, Kleiner Perkins sought $972,814 in legal costs but offered to withdraw the request if Pao declined to appeal the verdict. On June 1, 2015, Pao filed an appeal, one week before the deadline. On June 5, Kleiner Perkins claimed that Pao wanted $2.7 million to not appeal, an amount which they called "improper and excessive". A judge ruled on June 18 that Pao would only be responsible for $275,966 citing the economic resources of both parties under the Fair Employment and Housing Act. Pao filed an objection, arguing that an award against her could result in a chilling effect on future discrimination cases. On September 10, 2015, Pao wrote a guest post for Re/code in which she urged companies to be more open about bias accusations made by their employees. She also noted that there are behaviors that do not quite cross the line but can subtly change how a woman is perceived in the workplace. In the Re/code post, she stated that she was deciding not to appeal but still paying $276,000 due to an additional stipulation by Kleiner Perkins that the fee could only be waived after signing a non-disparagement agreement. However, one week later when Pao formally dropped her appeal, Kleiner Perkins filed to close the case without payment per its original announcement.

== Exit from Reddit ==
On June 10, 2015, a post on Reddit, signed by Pao and two other executives, announced that five subreddits were being banned for fostering off-site harassment. One such community, r/FatPeopleHate, had over 150,000 subscribers. Multiple change.org petitions calling for Pao's resignation were created by displeased Reddit users and the most popular one reached 10,000 signatures in the days following the change. Some users began posting hateful comments and images about Pao on Reddit and other websites. Other complaints about the site focused on inadequate moderation tools and the fact that some posts critical of Pao's lawsuit had been deleted by moderators.

So why am I leaving? Ultimately, the board asked me to demonstrate higher user growth in the next six months than I believe I can deliver while maintaining reddit's core principles.

— Ellen Pao's resignation post

Opposition increased on July 2 when large sections of Reddit were set to private to protest the dismissal of Victoria Taylor, Reddit's director of talent, known for co-ordinating the Ask Me Anything interviews. Expressing frustration over the decline in communication from Reddit management, AMA moderators stated that they had only learned about the firing indirectly after it happened. Despite one post to the contrary, Taylor's dismissal was widely attributed to Pao, with some commentators suggesting that the move diminished her credibility as an advocate for female employees. She received increased harassment as a result and the petition for her removal surpassed 200,000 signatures. On July 3, Pao issued apologies through Reddit and Time magazine. However, the Reddit post was thought to have been deleted after it received enough downvotes to lose visibility. In a longer post on July 6, she apologized for poor communication between staff members and for not delivering on promises. Pao resigned on July 10 and was replaced by Reddit co-founder Steve Huffman.

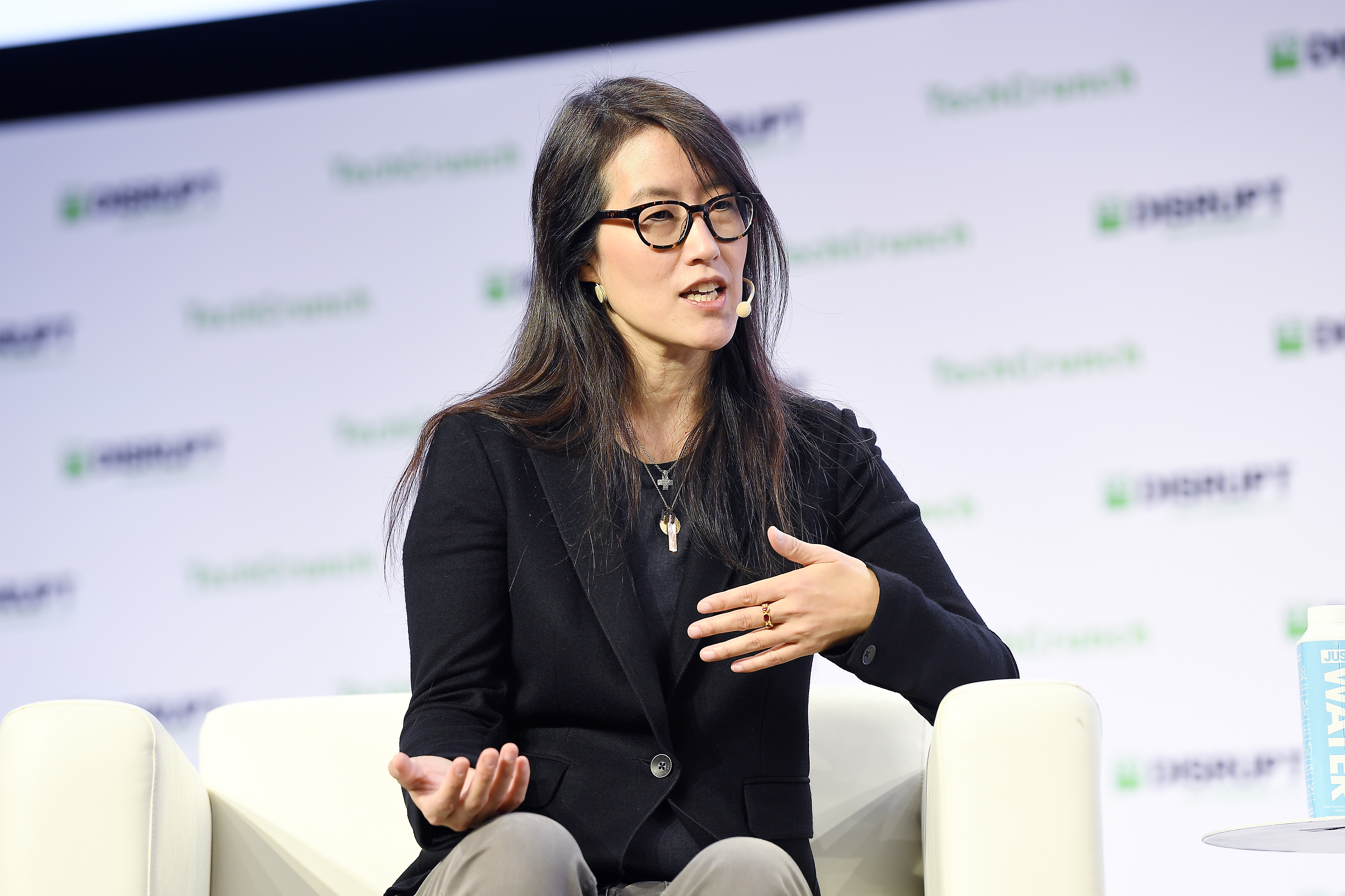
Pao speaks onstage during TechCrunch Disrupt San Francisco 2019 at Moscone Convention Center on October 4, 2019.

On July 12, former Reddit CEO Yishan Wong, who had previously defended the five bans on Quora, began a series of posts which he referred to as "declassifying a lot of things". The first drew attention to the fact that Victoria Taylor was in fact fired by Alexis Ohanian and not Pao. When shown that the media was covering this post, Pao tweeted "thanks for not blaming me for it". In a later post, which recalled two instances of Pao arguing against purging hateful subreddits, Wong sharply criticized the movement against her and warned about stricter policies under the site's cofounders. Huffman followed this by enacting a policy to reduce the prominence of some xenophobic communities and ban some others. On July 13, Reddit's chief engineer Bethanye Blount left the company for unrelated reasons and opined that Pao did not receive enough support from the board. Specifically, she referenced the glass cliff phenomenon in which women are allegedly given disproportionately unstable leadership positions. On July 16, Pao wrote about the difficulty of combating harassment while preserving "edgy content". The editorial described what she called "one of the largest trolling attacks in history" and the subsequent outpouring of support.

=== Controversy involving Reddit's CEO Steve Huffman ===
In June 2020, Pao released a tweet through her official Twitter profile, stating the need to "call out" Reddit's leadership.

The tweet contained arguments against current Reddit CEO Steve Huffman. Pao deemed him as responsible for the rampant racism and hatred on the platform, accusing Reddit of "monetizing white supremacy".

Huffman had previously released an open letter on the website in response to the George Floyd protests, in which he affirmed that the platform "[does] not tolerate hate, racism, and violence." Pao, however, found his remarks hypocritical and criticized Huffman.

Several popular subreddits, such as r/NBA and r/NFL, agreed with Pao, shutting down their pages for 24 hours, in a polemic against Huffman, calling out his letter as "hypocritical" and asking Reddit's leadership to take more concrete actions against racism on the platform.

== Views ==
In 2021, amid the fraud trial of former Theranos CEO Elizabeth Holmes, Pao wrote in the New York Times that it can both be true that Holmes "should be held accountable for her actions" and that male CEOs not being similarly held to account for misjudgement and wrongdoing is a symptom of sexism. As examples, she cited Facebook's role in facilitating the Rohingya genocide and propagating "anti-vaccination propaganda" under Mark Zuckerberg, Juul's misleading promotion of nicotine products, including to children, under Kevin Burns, and numerous scandals at Uber under Travis Kalanick.

== Personal life ==
Pao married Roger Kuo, they later divorced. She then married Buddy Fletcher in December 2007 in San Francisco. They met through Aspen Institute functions during the summer of 2007, after they were both appointed Crown Fellows. Pao and Fletcher have a daughter, born in July 2008. Pao is a vegetarian.

== See also ==
- Women in venture capital
