= David Lozeau =

American painter and writer

- Born: Merrimack, New Hampshire, U.S.
- Education: Keene State College
- Known for: Painting, murals, mixed media, T-shirt designs

David Lozeau is an American artist and children's book writer who has achieved media recognition for his paintings and exhibits relating to the Day of the Dead. Based in San Diego, California, Lozeau is part of a modern art movement that depicts skeleton characters as if they were alive. His paintings also pay tribute to cars, motorcycles, and guitars which have led to collaborations with Harley-Davidson and Fender Guitar Company.

Lozeau's representations of vintage cars and motorcycles align with the Kustom Kulture movement which celebrates mid-century American design. His work has been featured in Disney Parks' Wonderground Gallery, and he has twice been a Disney Parks artist-in-residence. He is a guild member of the Spanish Village Art Center in San Diego.

== Early life ==
David Lozeau was born in Merrimack, he was a very good artist. New Hampshire and began drawing at a very early age. Inspired by childhood heroes Bob Ross and Mark Kistler, he watched The Joy of Painting, The Secret City Adventures, and Mark Kistler's Imagination Station television series to learn the fundamentals of creating shadows, shapes, and perspective. In high school, he took as many art classes as he could and won awards for his pen and ink designs. In 1993, Lozeau enrolled in Keene State College, but was disappointed by the rigidity of the curriculum and sole focus on academia in the classroom. He worked for the college newspaper, The Equinox. He graduated in 1997 with a B.A. in graphic design and a minor in art, having only taken one painting class during the entire four-year span. Lozeau was employed as a graphic artist for seven years after graduating from college, during which time he focused solely on his design and marketing skills as a means to further his corporate career.

== Career ==
In 2004, Lozeau relocated to the west coast of the United States. There, he witnessed a pinstriping demonstration at a hot rod event in Anaheim, California. He believed that the lettering enamel used in pinstriping and sign painting, with its quick dry time and high gloss finish, would be the right medium by which to fine-tune his line work and further develop his character-driven style. He began painting professionally with acrylics, gouache, and oil-based enamel. In 2008 and 2009, Lozeau's art was featured in several Kustom Kulture magazines, including Tiki Magazine, Pinstriping and Kustom Graphics, as well as Jesse James' now defunct Garage Magazine.

For several years, Lozeau executed paintings on site at a variety of events such as art fairs and festivals. His technique was to paint a new piece with enamel atop acrylics. To offset the bold, shiny appearance of the enamels and get better performance than was offered by acrylics, Lozeau turned to gouache to complete his underpaintings, due to its fast dry time, opacity, and malleability. Switching to gouache allowed him to expand his color palette and enabled him to control the levels of transparency in his paintings. After experimenting with these various mediums for several years, Lozeau eventually developed a mixed media process of layering acrylics, gouache, and oil-based enamel in order to create pieces with tight line work. In 2010, Lozeau began building his own custom wood frames and adorning them with rusty metal, worn leather, and/or hand-woven accents in order to complete his vision for each unique painting.

In the same year, Lozeau was the featured artist for the Dia de los Muertos celebration at California's Mission San Luis Rey de Francia district. For that event, he painted a unique piece that was reproduced on the event's T-shirts and posters. His art was also featured in two hardcover books, The Day of the Dead: El Dia De Los Muertos and Kustom Graphics 2: Hot Rods, Burlesque, and Rock 'n' Roll published by Korero Press. Another of his paintings was published in the October edition of Ol' Skool Rodz magazine. In 2011, Lozeau was featured in a number of international publications, including Spain's El Diablo magazine and Germany's Customized Magazin.

In 2012, Lozeau co-wrote and illustrated the book Amigos de los Muertos and was featured in a number of magazines, including Car Kulture DeLuxe and Lowrider Arte, as well as online zine Cherry Picked Design. In 2013, Lozeau was the Artist in Residence at the Disneyland WonderGround Gallery, where his art was featured. He wrote and illustrated the first in a series of children's books about two winged skeletons and their pet dog, titled Lil' Devils Yearn to Fly. In 2014, Lozeau was once again the Artist in Residence at the Disneyland WonderGround Gallery, and was featured in Kustom Magazine and Lowrider magazine, and published his second children's book, Lil' Devils Want to Rock. In 2015, the Fender Guitar Company released four special edition guitars which feature illustrations by Lozeau. The "Sacred Heart," "Tree of Life," "Rose Tattoo," and "Dragon" guitars were timed for release prior to the NAMM Show. The guitar series was inspired by Lozeau's original guitar art. The new guitars are available as of March 24, 2015.

== Books ==
- Devils Want to Rock. Lozeau, David. (2014) Calavera Company. ISBN 978-0-9910858-1-1
- Devils Yearn to Fly. Lozeau, David. (2013) Calavera Company. ISBN 978-0-9910858-0-4
- Amigos de los Muertos (co-written with Jeral Tidwell). Last Gasp Publishing, 2012.
