= Matthew Thornton (disambiguation) =

Matthew Thornton was a signer of the US Declaration of Independence.

Matthew Thornton or Matt Thornton may also refer to:

- Matt Thornton (baseball) (born 1976), Major League Baseball relief pitcher
- Matt Thornton (martial artist) (born 1969), martial artist and founder of Straight Blast Gym
- Matthew Thornton Elementary School
- Matthew Thornton House
- SS Matthew Thornton, see List of Liberty ships
- Matthew Thornton, Sr., see Beale Street
- Matthew Thornton, mayor of Lambton, New South Wales
