= Matthew Thornton House =

Historic house in New Hampshire, United States

- U.S. National Register of Historic Places
- U.S. National Historic Landmark
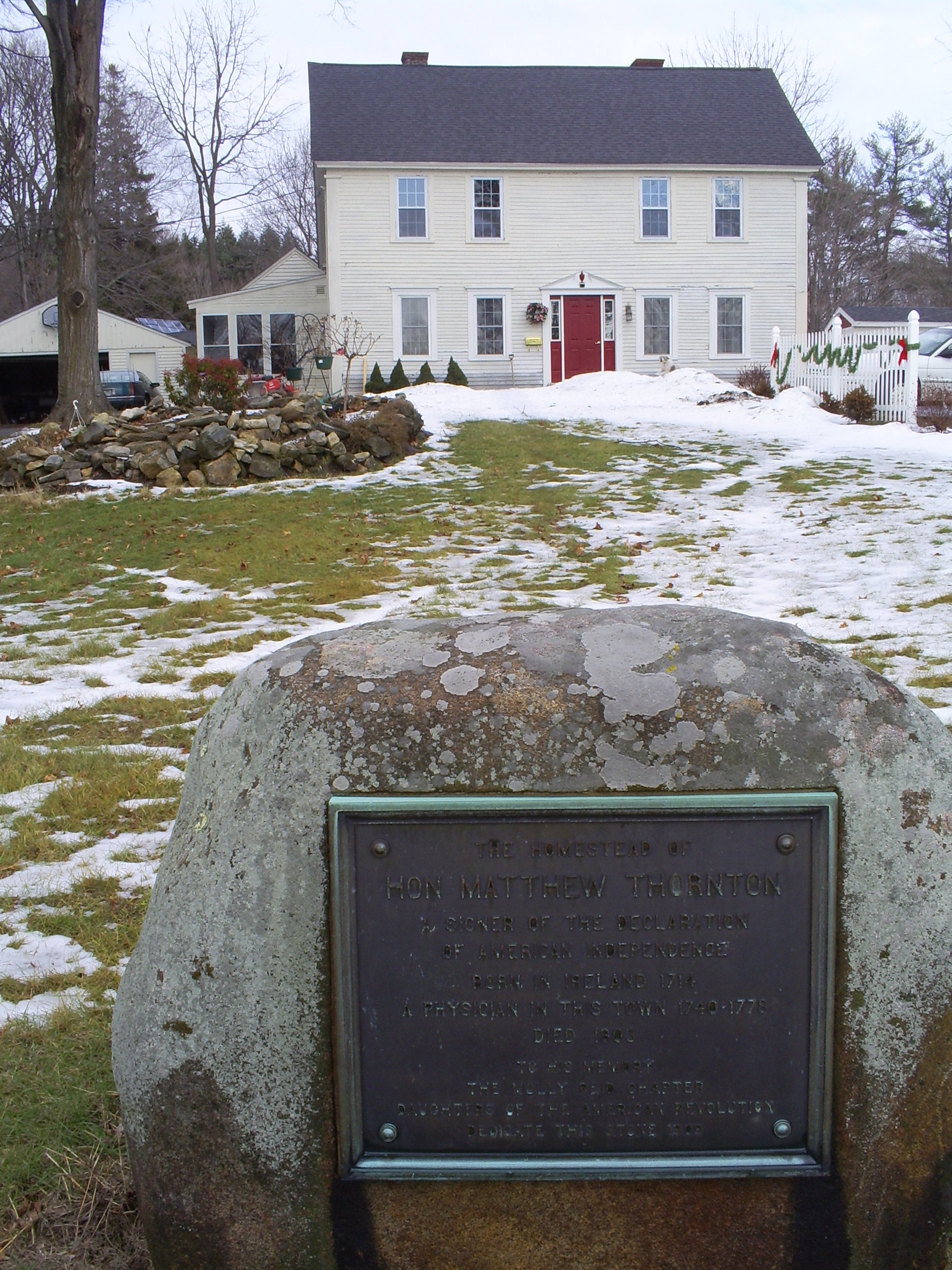
- The Matthew Thornton House

- Location within New Hampshire Location within the United States
- Location: 2 Thornton Street, Derry Village, New Hampshire
- Coordinates: 42°53′38″N 71°18′46″W
- Area: 2.5 acres (1.0 ha)
- Architectural style: Greek Revival, Colonial
- NRHP reference No.: 71000053

Significant dates
- Added to NRHP: November 11, 1971
- Designated NHL: November 11, 1971

The Matthew Thornton House is a historic house and National Historic Landmark in Derry, New Hampshire. It was from 1740 to 1779 the home of Matthew Thornton, a Founding Father and signer of the U.S. Declaration of Independence.

The main block of the house has a roughly square footprint and has the classic New England saltbox shape. It is five bays wide and two deep, with a steeply-sloping leanto section to the north (rear). In the 19th century Greek Revival trim details were added, including wide pilasters at the corners, and a portico sheltering the front entry. The first-floor windows are topped by decorative cornices. A single-story ell projects from one side of the rear, giving the house an L shape; this wing was built to house more modern kitchen facilities and servants' facilities. The interior plan of the main house is a typical center-hall plan, with four rooms on each floor. The house's chimneys were replaced in the 19th century with smaller ones. The house was declared a National Historic Landmark in 1971, and was listed on the National Register of Historic Places.

Matthew Thornton was born in Ireland, probably in 1714, and came to North America with his parents in 1718. He trained as a doctor, opening his practice in Derry in 1740. He entered New Hampshire provincial politics in 1758, serving in the assembly until 1775, when a provisional assembly took over governance. Thornton helped draft a new state constitution, and was elected to the Second Continental Congress in 1776. He served there for one year, signing the Declaration of Independence even though he did not take office until November 1776. In 1780 he moved to Merrimack, where he remained active in state politics. He died in 1803, and is buried in the Signer's Cemetery, near his Merrimack home; the cemetery and Merrimack house are also listed on the National Register.

== See also ==
- List of National Historic Landmarks in New Hampshire
- National Register of Historic Places listings in Rockingham County, New Hampshire
