= East Merrimack, New Hampshire =

Census-designated place in New Hampshire, United States

- Census-designated place
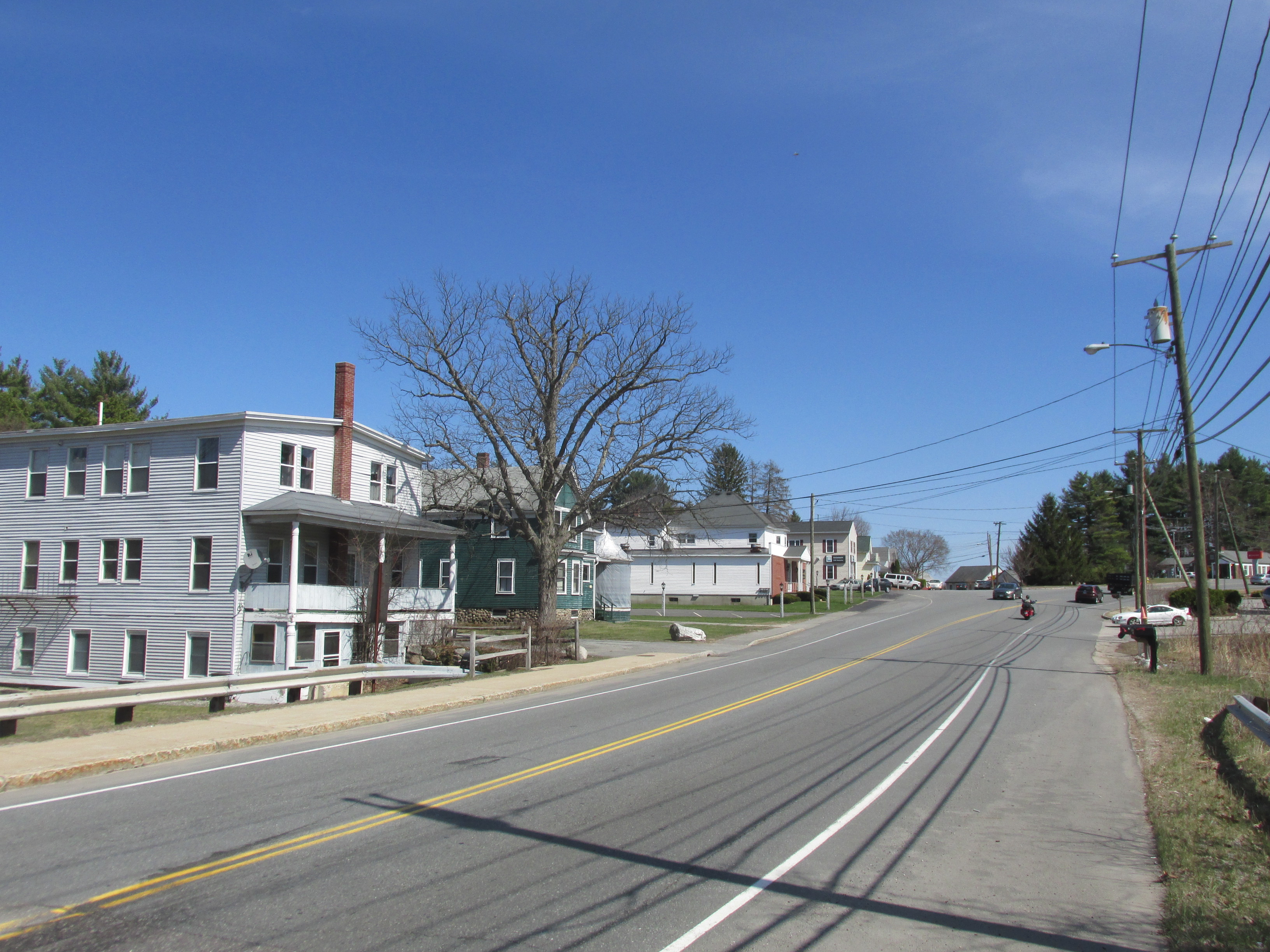
- Daniel Webster Highway

- Location within New Hampshire Location within the United States
- Coordinates: 42°51′35″N 71°29′27″W
- Country: United States
- State: New Hampshire
- County: Hillsborough
- Town: Merrimack

Area
  - Total: 3.72 sq mi (9.63 km^{2})
  - Land: 3.37 sq mi (8.74 km^{2})
  - Water: 0.34 sq mi (0.89 km^{2})
- Elevation: 98 ft (30 m)

Population (2020)
  - Total: 5,176
  - Density: 1,533.4/sq mi (592.03/km^{2})
- Time zone: UTC-5 (Eastern (EST))
  - Summer (DST): UTC-4 (EDT)
- Area code: 603
- FIPS code: 33-21780
- GNIS feature ID: 1867352

East Merrimack is a census-designated place (CDP) in the town of Merrimack, New Hampshire, United States. There is no village center named "East Merrimack"; rather, the CDP refers to the region of the town of Merrimack lying east of the F. E. Everett Turnpike, overlapping portions of the villages of Reeds Ferry, Thornton's Ferry, and the center of Merrimack. The population was 5,176 at the 2020 census, up from 4,197 at the 2010 census.

== Geography ==
East Merrimack is located in the eastern part of the town of Merrimack, bordered to the west by the Everett Turnpike and to the east by the Merrimack River, which forms the town boundary with Litchfield. To the north, the CDP extends to the Bedford town line, and to the south it extends past Star Drive. U.S. Route 3 is the main road through the CDP, leading north 10 miles (16 km) to Manchester and south 7 miles (11 km) to Nashua. The Everett Turnpike is accessible from Exit 11 (Continental Boulevard) near the southern end of the CDP and from partial Exit 12 (Bedford Road) near the north end.

According to the United States Census Bureau, the CDP has a total area of 3.7 square miles (9.6 km^{2}), of which 3.4 square miles (8.7 km^{2}) are land and 0.3 square miles (0.9 km^{2}), or 9.27%, are water. Most of the water area is within the Merrimack River.

== Demographics ==
Historical population
Census	Pop.	Note	%±
1980	2,052		—
1990	3,656		78.2%
2000	3,784		3.5%
2010	4,197		10.9%
2020	5,176		23.3%
U.S. Decennial Census

=== 2020 census ===
As of the 2020 census, East Merrimack had a population of 5,176. The median age was 42.7 years. 16.5% of residents were under the age of 18 and 19.7% of residents were 65 years of age or older. For every 100 females there were 88.3 males, and for every 100 females age 18 and over there were 84.3 males age 18 and over.

100.0% of residents lived in urban areas, while 0.0% lived in rural areas.

There were 2,532 households in East Merrimack, of which 21.0% had children under the age of 18 living in them. Of all households, 35.3% were married-couple households, 21.2% were households with a male householder and no spouse or partner present, and 33.4% were households with a female householder and no spouse or partner present. About 37.4% of all households were made up of individuals and 14.4% had someone living alone who was 65 years of age or older.

There were 2,713 housing units, of which 6.7% were vacant. The homeowner vacancy rate was 0.4% and the rental vacancy rate was 11.5%.

Racial composition as of the 2020 census
Race	Number	Percent
White	4,502	87.0%
Black or African American	113	2.2%
American Indian and Alaska Native	13	0.3%
Asian	146	2.8%
Native Hawaiian and Other Pacific Islander	5	0.1%
Some other race	81	1.6%
Two or more races	316	6.1%
Hispanic or Latino (of any race)	229	4.4%

=== 2010 census ===
As of the census of 2010, there were 4,197 people, 1,928 households, and 1,093 families residing in the CDP. There were 2,028 housing units, of which 100, or 4.9%, were vacant. The racial makeup of the CDP was 93.2% white, 1.3% African American, 0.4% Native American, 1.9% Asian, 0.02% Pacific Islander, 1.1% some other race, and 2.1% from two or more races. 3.5% of the population were Hispanic or Latino of any race.

Of the 1,928 households in the CDP, 26.7% had children under the age of 18 living with them, 39.3% were headed by married couples living together, 12.1% had a female householder with no husband present, and 43.3% were non-families. 34.2% of all households were made up of individuals, and 11.3% were someone living alone who was 65 years of age or older. The average household size was 2.16, and the average family size was 2.76.

19.8% of residents in the CDP were under the age of 18, 6.2% were from age 18 to 24, 30.5% were from 25 to 44, 28.3% were from 45 to 64, and 15.3% were 65 years of age or older. The median age was 40.0 years. For every 100 females, there were 93.6 males. For every 100 females age 18 and over, there were 87.9 males.

=== Income and poverty ===
For the period 2011–15, the estimated median annual income for a household was $58,125, and the median income for a family was $79,758. Male full-time workers had a median income of $44,911 versus $46,933 for females. The per capita income for the CDP was $34,337. 6.4% of the population and 8.0% of families were below the poverty line, along with 9.4% of people under the age of 18 and 10.4% of people 65 or older.
