= Merrimack Premium Outlets =

Outlet mall in Merrimack, New Hampshire, United States

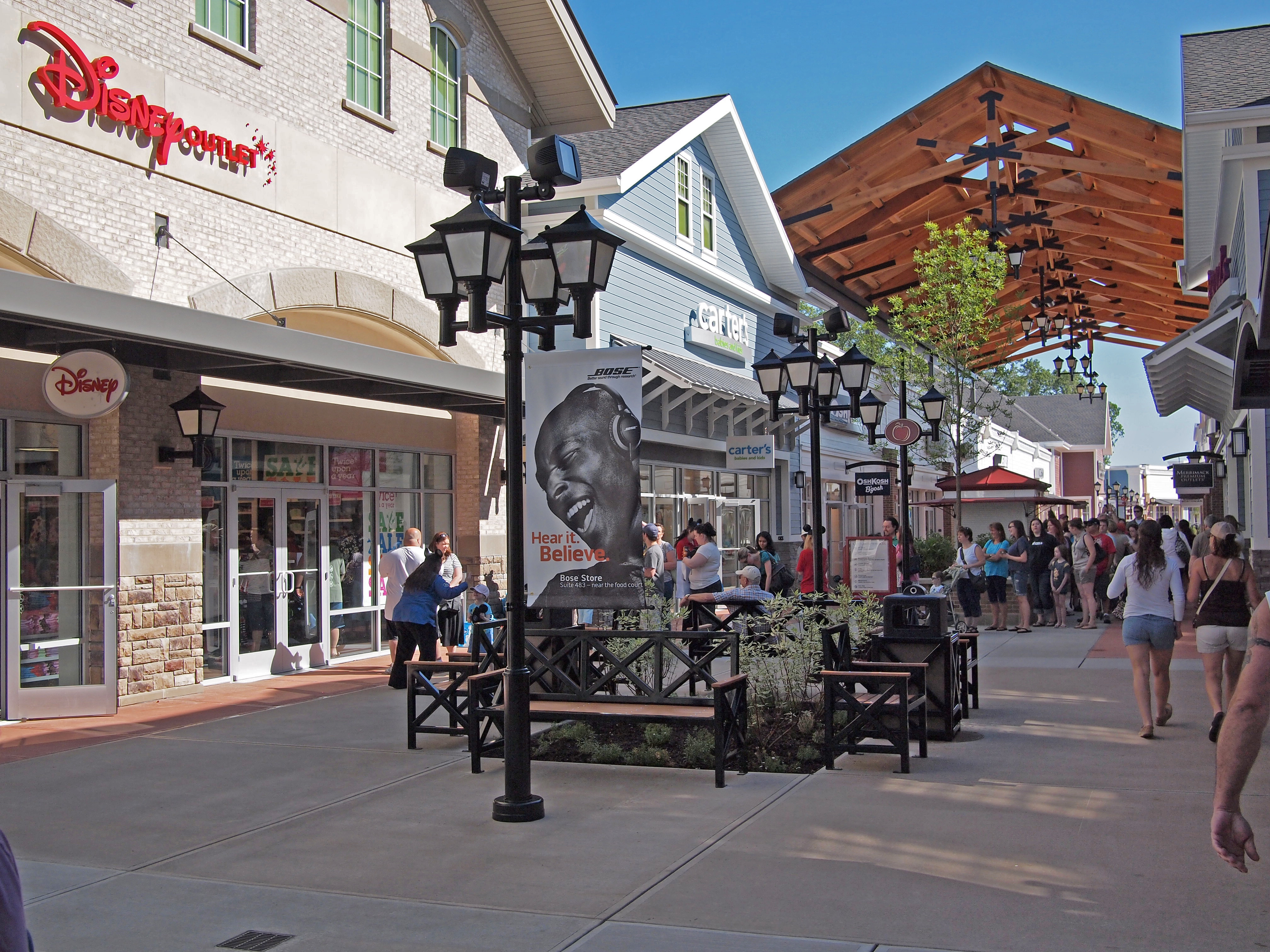
- Stores in June 2012
- Location: Merrimack, New Hampshire, United States
- Coordinates: 42°49′34.13″N 71°29′59.68″W
- Opened: June 14, 2012
- Manager: Simon Premium Outlets
- Owner: Simon Property Group
- Num. of stores: 100
- Floor area: 560,000 sq ft (52,000 m^{2})
- Floors: 1
- Website: www.premiumoutlets.com/outlets/outlet.asp?id=101

The Merrimack Premium Outlets is an outlet mall located in Merrimack, New Hampshire, United States. It opened on June 14, 2012, and contains 103 stores and restaurants.

The mall includes several upscale outlets, such as Barbour, Coach, Michael Kors, Guess, True Religion, and Lucky Brand Jeans. Larger anchor-type stores in the complex include Polo Ralph Lauren, Saks Off 5th, Bloomingdales Outlet, and a Banana Republic factory store.

The complex is located off Exit 10 of the F.E. Everett Turnpike in Merrimack, and is not far from U.S. Route 3, the major north/south surface road in town.
