= Laurene Allen =

American community and environmental health activist

- Born: Merrimack, New Hampshire, United States
- Occupations: Environmental health activist, community organizer
- Known for: Advocacy against PFAS contamination in New Hampshire
- Awards: Goldman Environmental Prize (2025)

Laurene Allen is an American community and environmental health activist based in Merrimack, New Hampshire. She is known for her work addressing contamination from PFAS linked to the Saint-Gobain Performance Plastics plant in Merrimack. In 2025, Allen received the Goldman Environmental Prize for North America for her community-based efforts to raise awareness of PFAS pollution and advocate for stronger environmental protections in New Hampshire.

== Background ==
Allen has lived in Merrimack since the 1980s and previously worked as a clinical social worker. She became involved in environmental issues after local water tests revealed elevated PFAS levels in 2016. At that time, the contamination was traced to emissions from the nearby Saint-Gobain facility.

== Environmental activism ==
Following the discovery, Allen helped organize residents to seek more information from state agencies and the company involved. She co-founded the group Merrimack Citizens for Clean Water, which began hosting meetings, collecting data on affected households, and advocating for remediation. The organization later helped establish the National PFAS Contamination Coalition, linking communities facing similar pollution issues across the United States.

Allen and other local advocates pressed for increased testing, bottled water distribution, and long-term cleanup under state supervision. Their sustained advocacy contributed to new state water regulations on PFAS limits and public treatment systems.

== Closure of the Saint-Gobain plant ==
In 2023, Saint-Gobain announced it would permanently close its Merrimack facility, citing economic factors and regulatory uncertainty. Local reporting described the decision as a result of ongoing scrutiny and enforcement actions following years of complaints from residents and environmental groups. Cleanup and remediation efforts remain under review by the New Hampshire Department of Environmental Services.

== Recognition ==
In April 2025, Allen was named the North American recipient of the Goldman Environmental Prize. The award recognized her efforts to mobilize affected residents, promote community health research, and encourage policy changes to reduce PFAS exposure. The prize citation highlighted her evidence-based advocacy and involvement in environmental justice initiatives.

== See also ==
- Environmental justice in the United States
- Goldman Environmental Prize
- Water pollution in the United States
