= Signer's House and Matthew Thornton Cemetery =

United States historic place in New Hampshire

- U.S. National Register of Historic Places
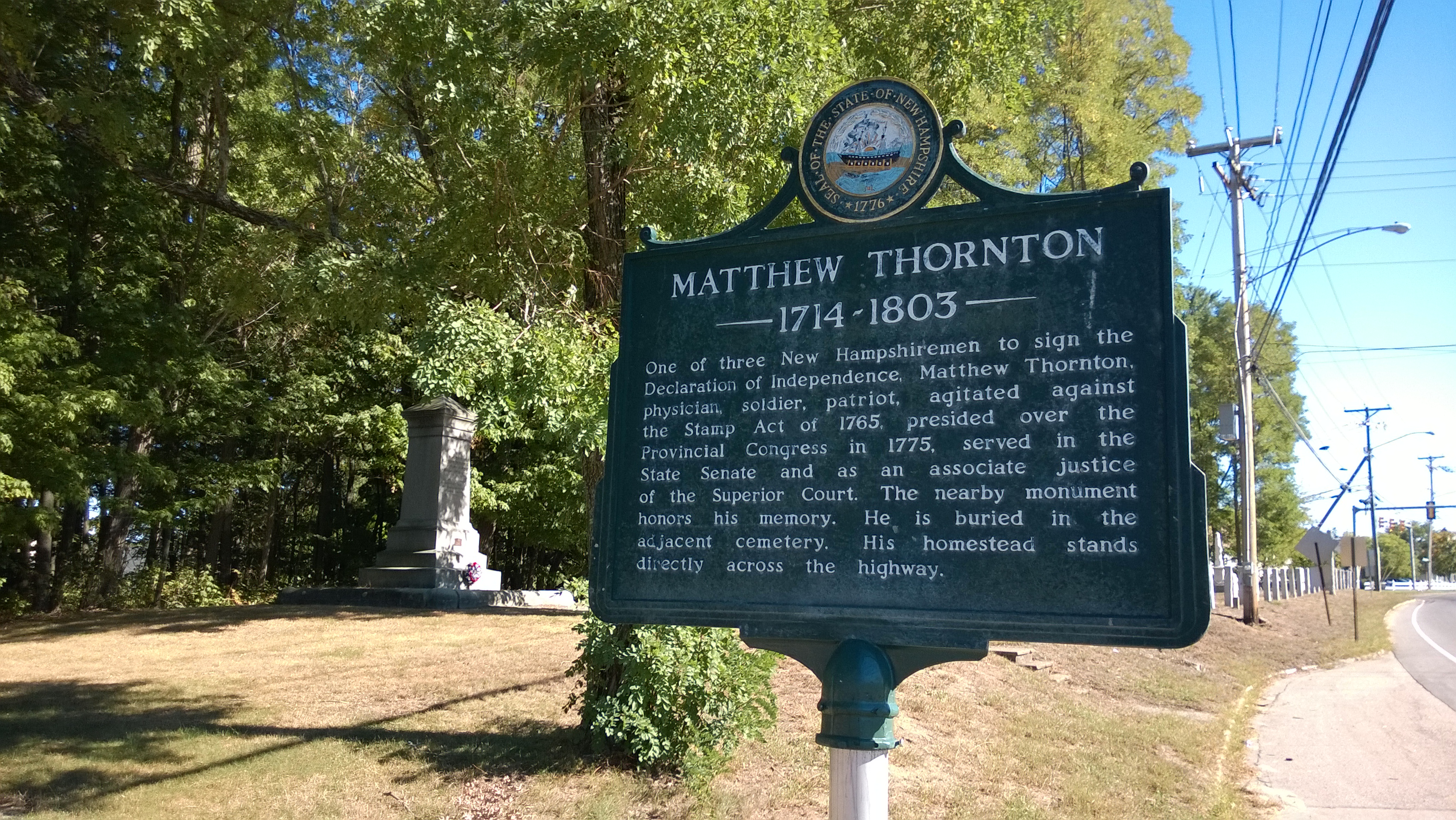
- Historical marker at the site

- Location within New Hampshire Location within the United States
- Location: Merrimack, New Hampshire
- Coordinates: 42°50′23″N 71°29′30″W
- Area: 2 acres (0.81 ha)
- Built: 1770
- Architectural style: Georgian
- NRHP reference No.: 78000214
- Added to NRHP: December 22, 1978

The Signer's House and Matthew Thornton Cemetery are a pair of historic properties in Merrimack, New Hampshire, United States. It consists of a house, once owned by Matthew Thornton, a signer of the United States Declaration of Independence, and the adjacent cemetery in which he is buried. The house is a two-story Georgian style double house, and is the only surviving house of the period in Merrimack. It was owned by Thornton from 1780 to 1797, when he sold it to his son James. The cemetery, located across the Daniel Webster Highway from the house, is also Merrimack's first cemetery, with the oldest gravestone marked 1742.

The house was listed on the National Register of Historic Places in 1978. It is now occupied by the Common Man restaurant.

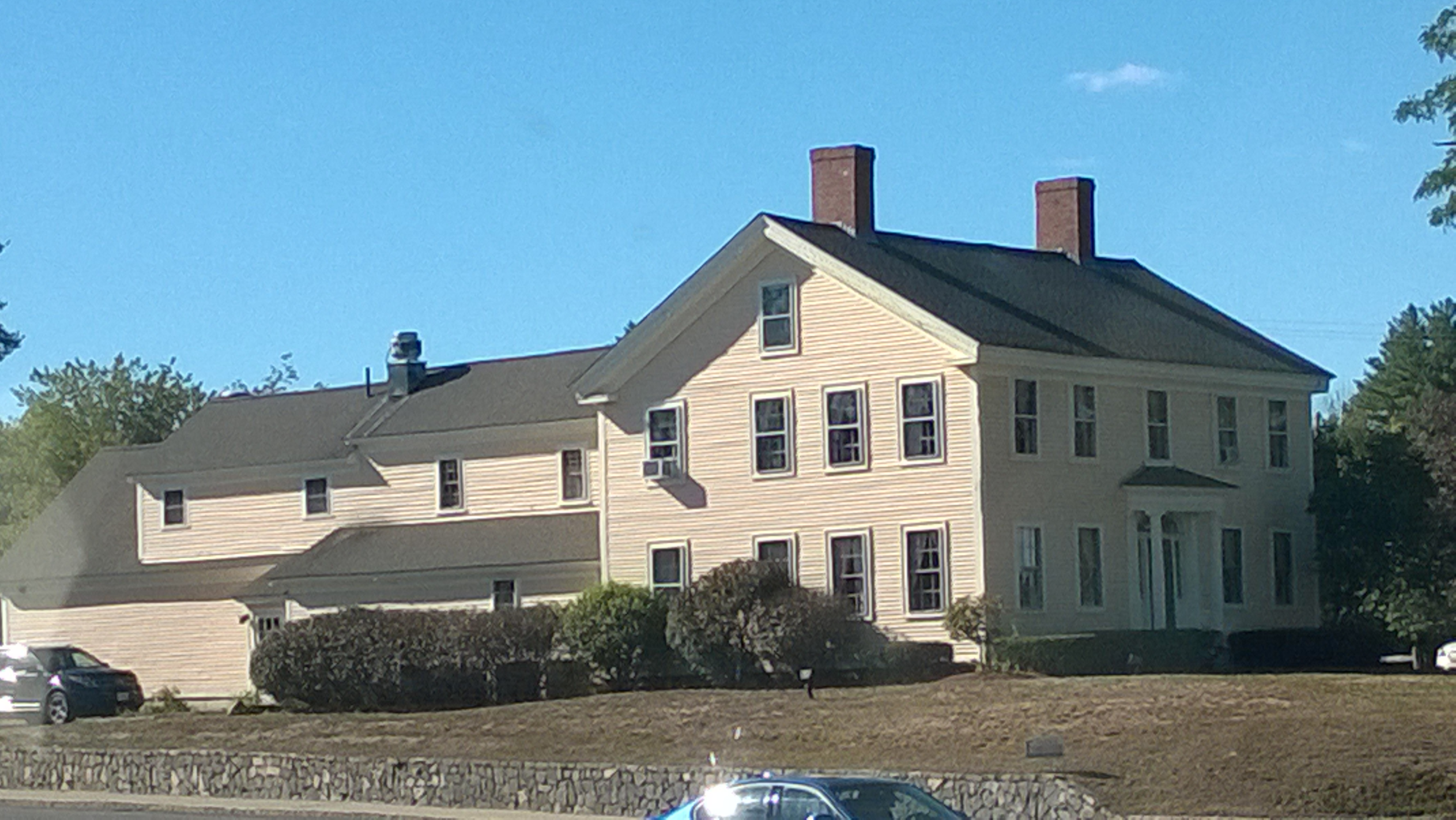
Old inn run by Thornton, close to the old ferry landing at the end of what is now called Griffin Street

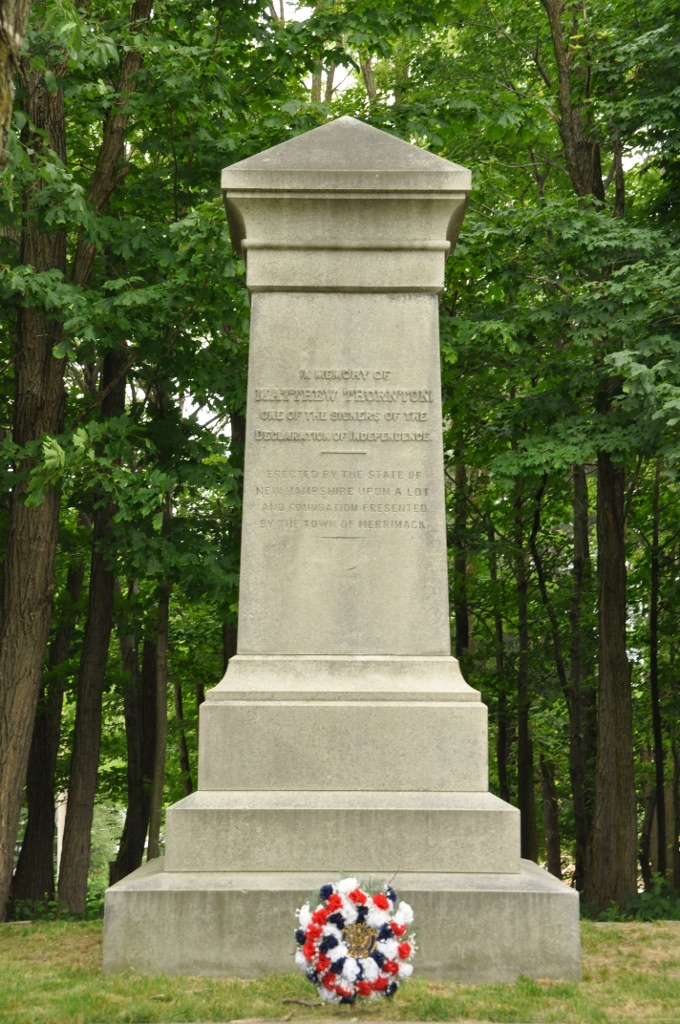
Grave marker near his burial site

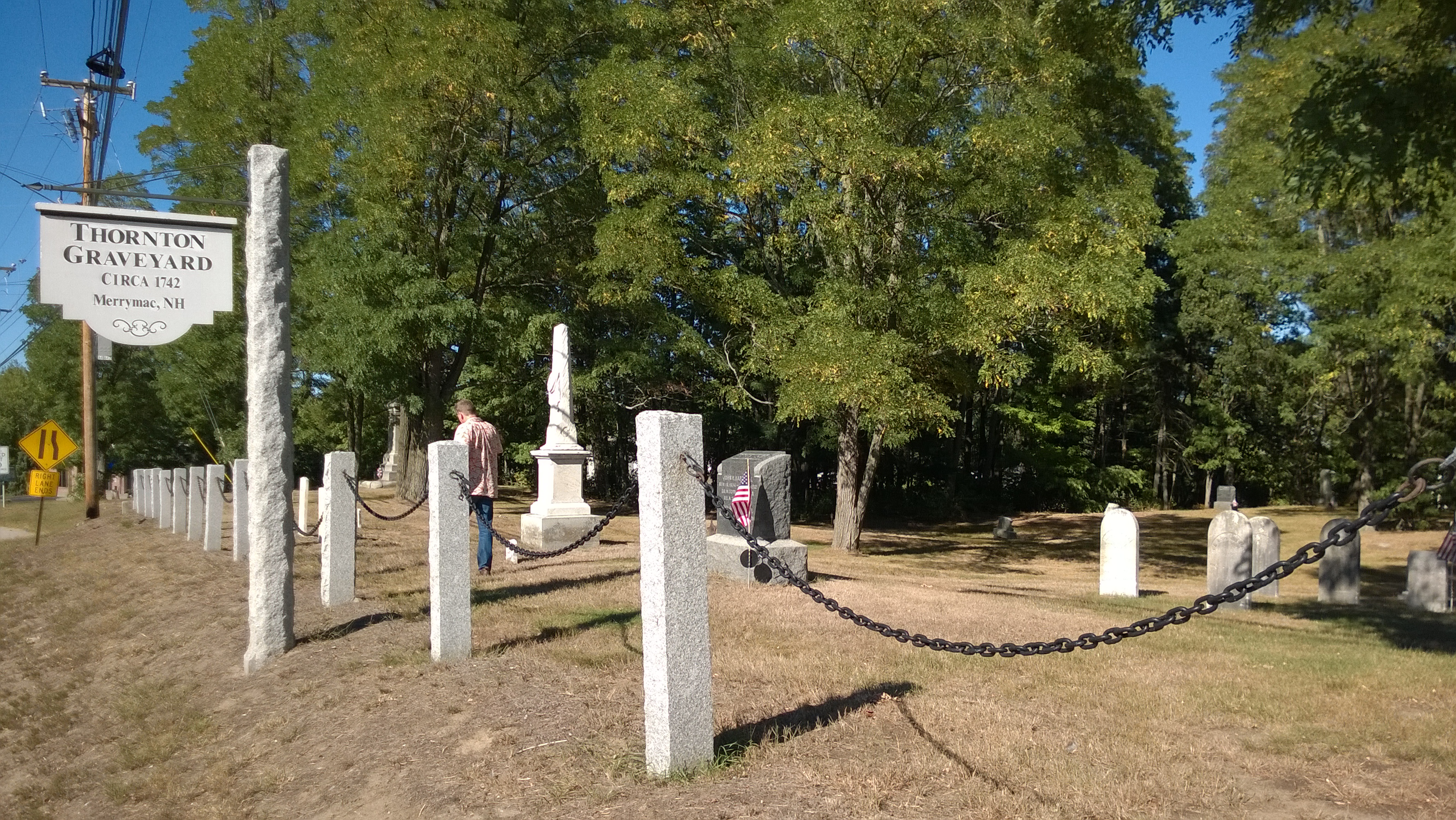
Graveyard sign on Daniel Webster Highway

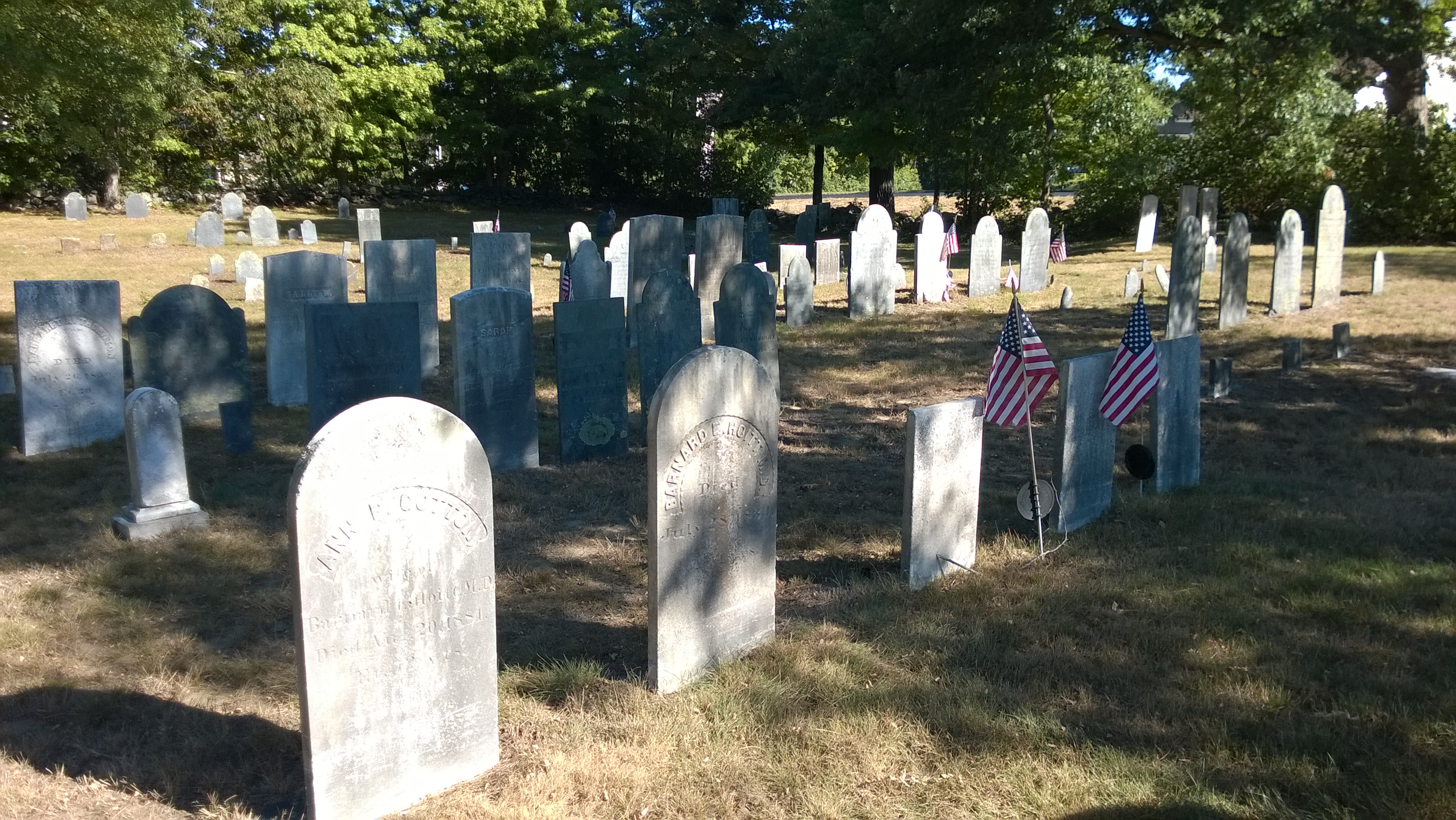
Grave markers in Thornton cemetery

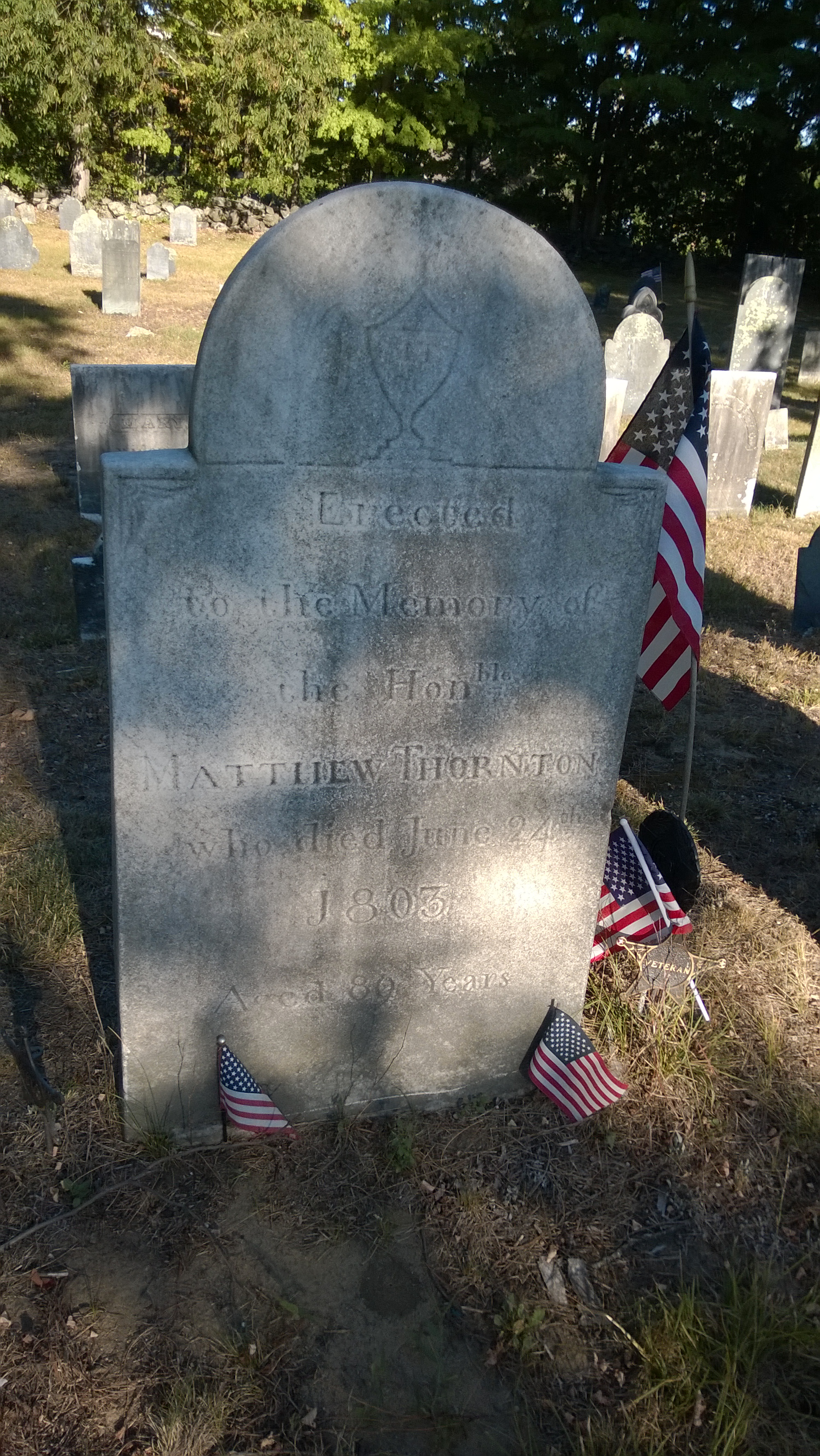
Headstone from 1803 for Matthew Thornton

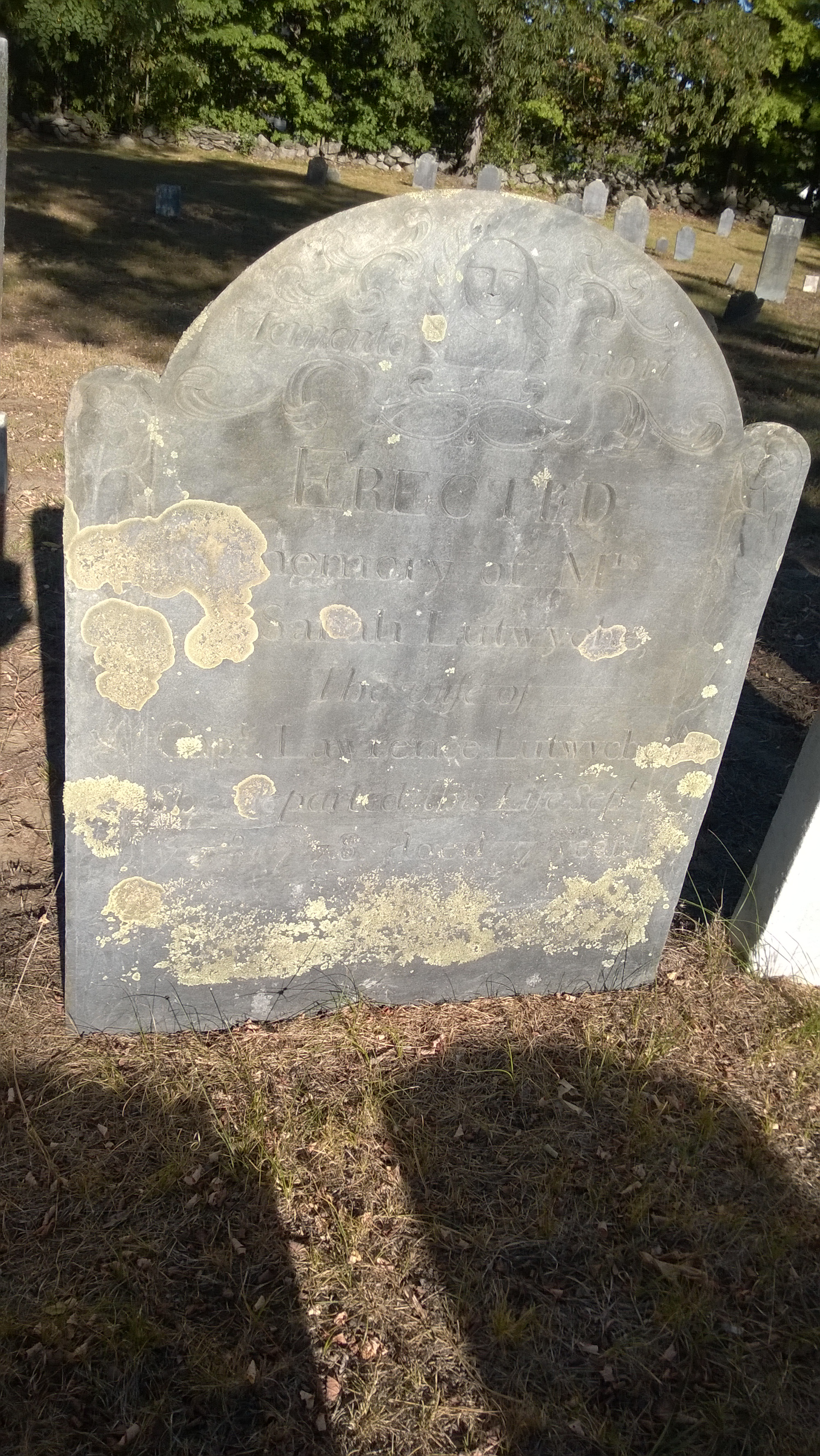
Grave of Sarah Lutwyche from 1778

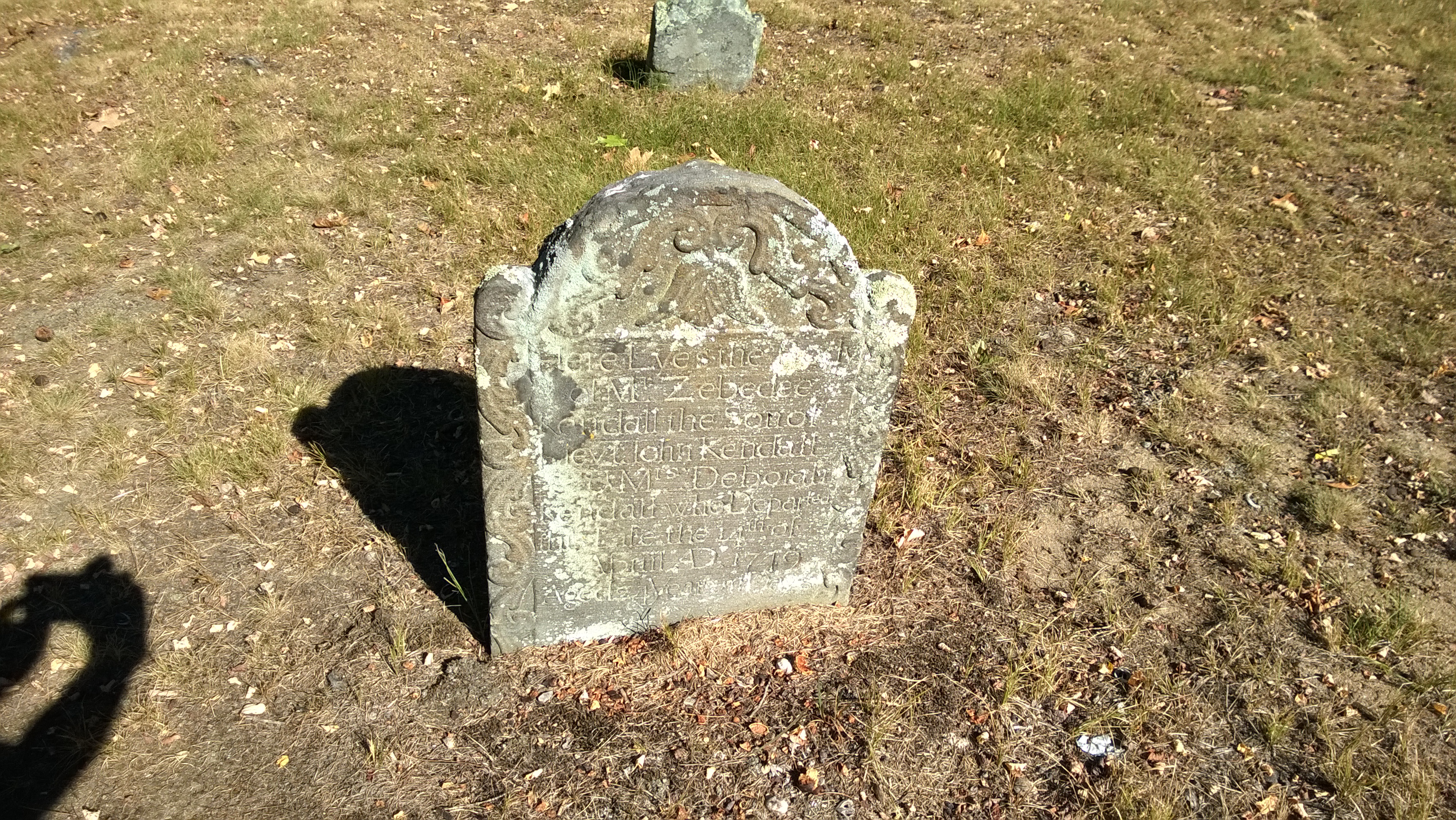
Early grave marker from 1749

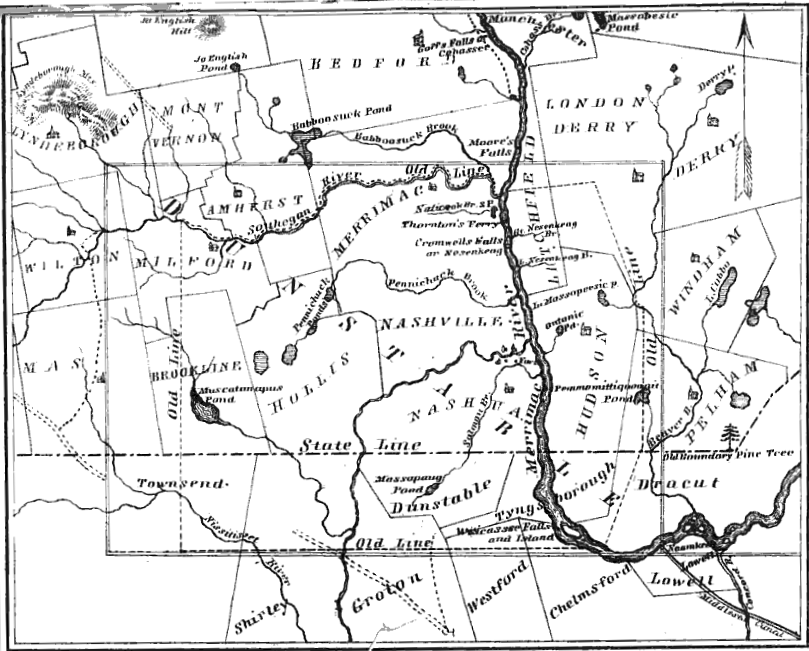
Old 1846 map showing the location of Thorntons Ferry on the Merrimack River

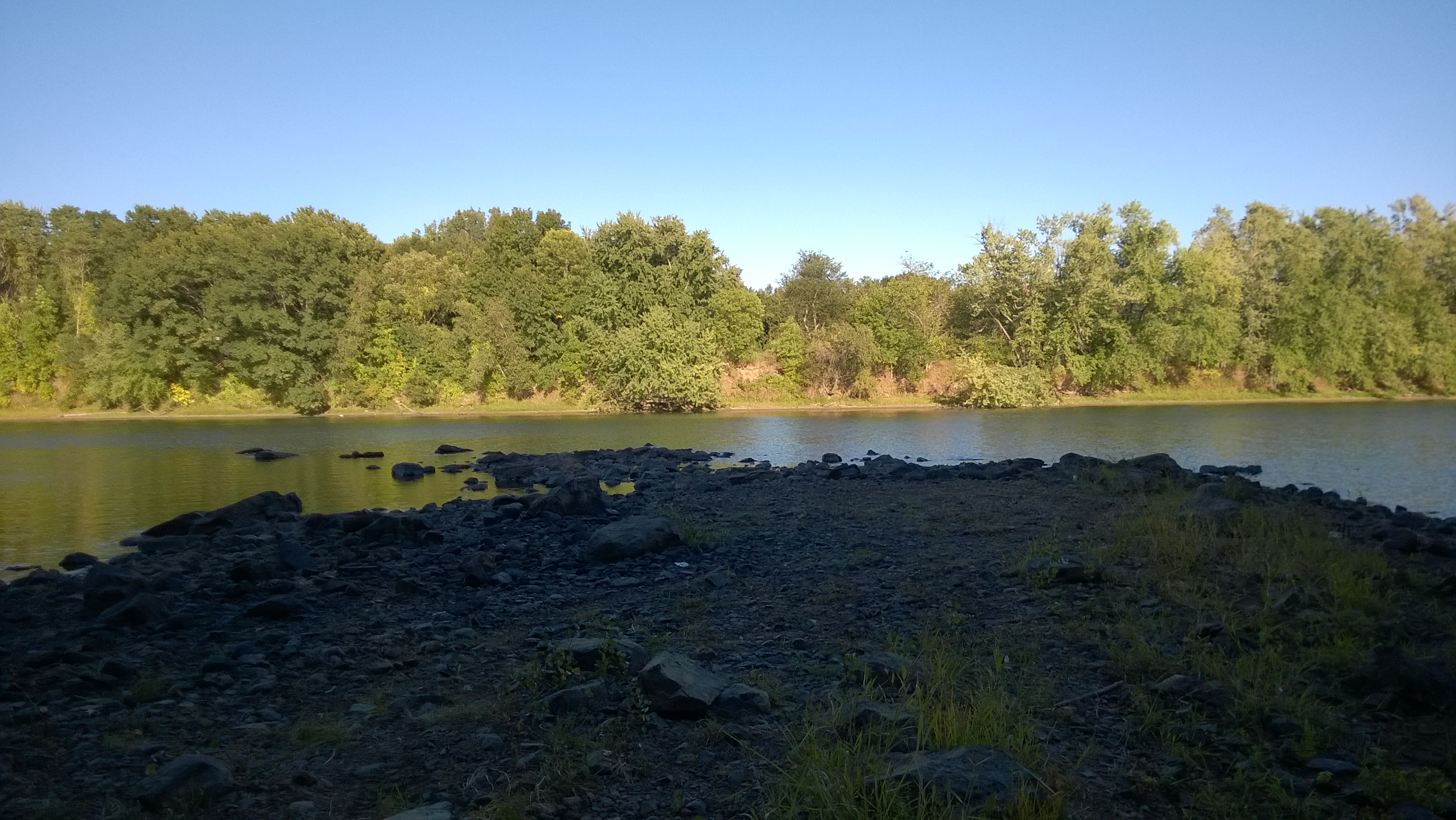
Remains of ferry landing site on Merrimack side looking towards Litchfield

According to surviving archival documents, the area was formerly known as Lutwyche's Ferry, and the building currently called the Signer's House was in fact built by Matthew Thornton's son Matthew Jr. on the previous location of a farm purchased by Matthew Thornton in 1780 from William Spooner. The previous owner Spooner had obtained the farm and ferry titles somehow from the town, which had seized the property from Col. Edward Goldstone Lutwyche who had obtained ferry rights in 1767. He was a colonel of the Fifth Provincial regiment and a Loyalist. He refused an order to call out his regiment for the battles of Lexington and Concord, and on the night of April 20, 1775, left Merrimack for Boston within the British lines, leaving ownership to his mother Sarah, who remained. Sarah appealed for and was granted restoration of the ferry rights on October 24, 1775, and held them until her death September 7, 1778, aged 77 years. She is buried in Thornton cemetery.

On April 14, 1784, records show Thornton needed to petition for reinstatement of ferry rights which again had been confiscated by the town upon the occasion of Sarah's death. He was successful and sold the rights in 1797 to his son Matthew Jr.

== See also ==
- National Register of Historic Places listings in Hillsborough County, New Hampshire
