= PC Connection =

Fortune 1000 technology company

PC Connection, Inc.
- Type: Public
- Traded as: Nasdaq: CNXN; S&P 600 Component; Russell 2000 Component
- Founded: 1982; 44 years ago
- Founder: Patricia Gallup
- Headquarters: Merrimack, New Hampshire, U.S.
- Key people: Patricia Gallup (chairman); Timothy McGrath (president and CEO); Thomas C. Baker (SVP, CFO, and Treasurer)
- Products: Notebooks/Mobility, Software, Servers/Storage, Net/Com Product, Other Hardware/Services
- Revenue: ▲$2.87 billion USD (2025)
- Net income: ▼$83.7 million USD (2025)
- Number of employees: 2,600+
- Website: Official website

PC Connection, Inc., doing business as Connection, is headquartered in Merrimack, New Hampshire. It has more than 2,600 employees and sells more than 460,000 products.

Founded in 1982, Connection has grown to include IT services to SMB, enterprise, and public sector markets.

== History ==
PC Connection, Inc. was founded in 1982 by Patricia Gallup and David Hall. The co-founders met while serving as a support crew to hikers on the Appalachian Trail.

The company's first headquarters occupied a former woodworking mill in Marlow, NH population 542 at the time. To launch their business, Gallup and Hall used Gallup's savings of $8,000 to purchase inventory and take out a 1/9th-page ad in Byte magazine. In 1984, they started selling Macintosh products under the MacConnection brand.

In 1987, PC Connection was named to the Inc. 500 as the second fastest growing company in the United States.

In March 1998, the company completed its initial public offering on the NASDAQ exchange under the symbol PCCC.

In September 2016, the company announced that it would rebrand as simply Connection, in an effort to unify its divisions. The company stated that the new name "better reflects the promise of our future and the successes of our past".

== Locations ==
In addition to its corporate headquarters in Merrimack, PC Connection, Inc. has sales and support offices in Keene, New Hampshire; Rockville, Maryland; Dakota Dunes, South Dakota; Boca Raton, Florida; Schaumburg, IL; and Exton, Pennsylvania. The company operates a 268,000-square-foot distribution and fulfillment complex, equipped with a technical configuration lab in Wilmington, Ohio.

== Marketing ==
PC Connection was known for magazine ads featuring illustrations of anthropomorphic raccoons (and occasionally, other animals) living in a fictionalized version of Marlow. The ads were developed by the New Hampshire-based advertising agency Church and Main, intending to symbolize a goal to make computing less "scary", and play up the rural location of PC Connection's headquarters.

The agency's copywriter David Blistein was influenced by an edition of the children's novel The Wind in the Willows illustrated by E. H. Shepard, and hired local illustrator Erick Ingraham to develop the concept further. Ingraham explained that the choice of raccoons as a mascot was likely because of their dexterity, as it allowed them to be portrayed operating PCs and other peripherals. Ingraham's illustrations and the raccoons would be a regular fixture of PC Connection's marketing through the 1980s, with the company's catalogs featuring more fantastical artwork. The raccoon imagery began to be downplayed by the company in the mid-1990s, due to changes in marketing practices amid the commodification of the PC industry, growing focus on business customers, and its shift away from magazine advertising to focus on ecommerce.

== Acquisitions ==
In 1999, Connection purchased ComTeq Federal, a Maryland-based company serving the computing needs of federal government agencies, including the Navy, Federal Deposit Insurance Corp, the National Security Agency, and Internal Revenue Service. Renamed GovConnection, Inc., the subsidiary serves all government and education customers.

In January 2000, Connection announced the agreement to acquire Merisel Inc.

In 2002, Connection acquired MoreDirect, a Florida-based company specializing in Web-based eProcurement.

In 2005, Connection purchased the business and selected assets of Amherst Technologies, Inc., a New Hampshire-based IT provider.

In 2011, Connection acquired ValCom Technologies, a technology services company in the Chicago metropolitan area.

In 2016, Connection acquired Softmart, a supplier of hardware and software.

In 2016, Connection acquired GlobalServe, a global reseller.
