= Reeds Ferry, New Hampshire =

Unincorporated community in New Hampshire, United States

- Unincorporated community
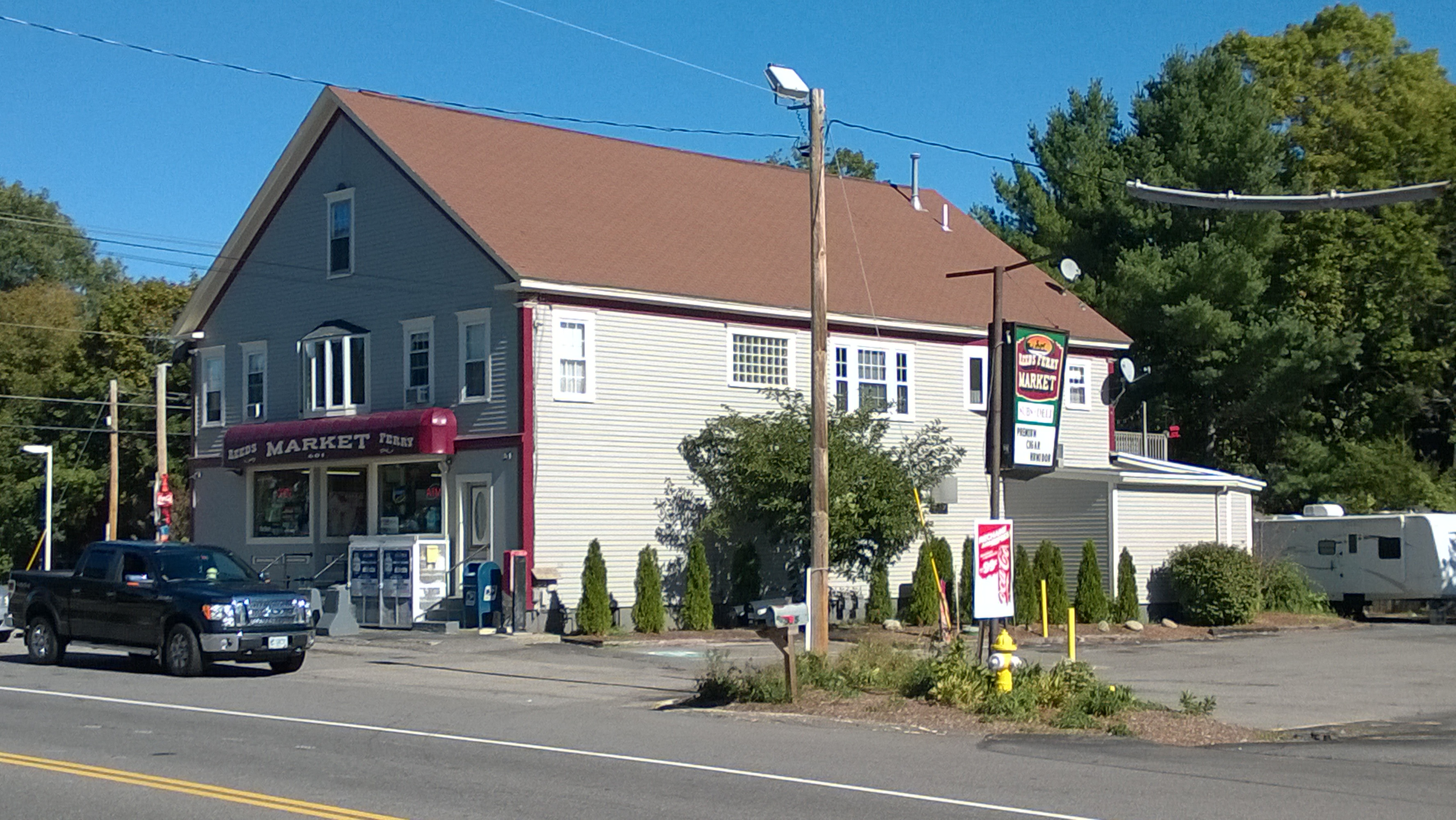
- Village market at the junction of Rte. 3 and Bedford Road

- Location within New Hampshire Location within the United States
- Coordinates: 42°52′59″N 71°28′33″W
- Country: United States
- State: New Hampshire
- County: Hillsborough
- Town: Merrimack
- Elevation: 188 ft (57 m)
- Time zone: UTC-5 (Eastern (EST))
  - Summer (DST): UTC-4 (EDT)
- Area code: 603
- GNIS feature ID: 869479

Reeds Ferry is the northern portion of the town of Merrimack, New Hampshire, in the United States. Reeds Ferry is centered on the current intersection of Bedford Road and Daniel Webster Highway (U.S. Route 3) and is named after William Reed's ferry landing site on the Merrimack River located at the bottom of what is now called Depot Street.

The boundaries of the area are unclear, as the northwestern part of Merrimack near Baboosic Lake is not traditionally considered a portion of Reed's Ferry, because as a village it was defined as located on the Merrimack River. The Baboosic Lake area is separated from the Reeds Ferry village center by the Everett Turnpike, and the village center is divided from the river bank today by the railway. Reeds Ferry Elementary School is located on Lyons Road. Reeds Ferry cemetery is at the junction of Bedford Road and Route 3. The parking lot of the ferry landing site, today in use as a boat ramp for the Merrimack River, is the site of the former Reeds Ferry train station, which was in use from 1842 to 1967.

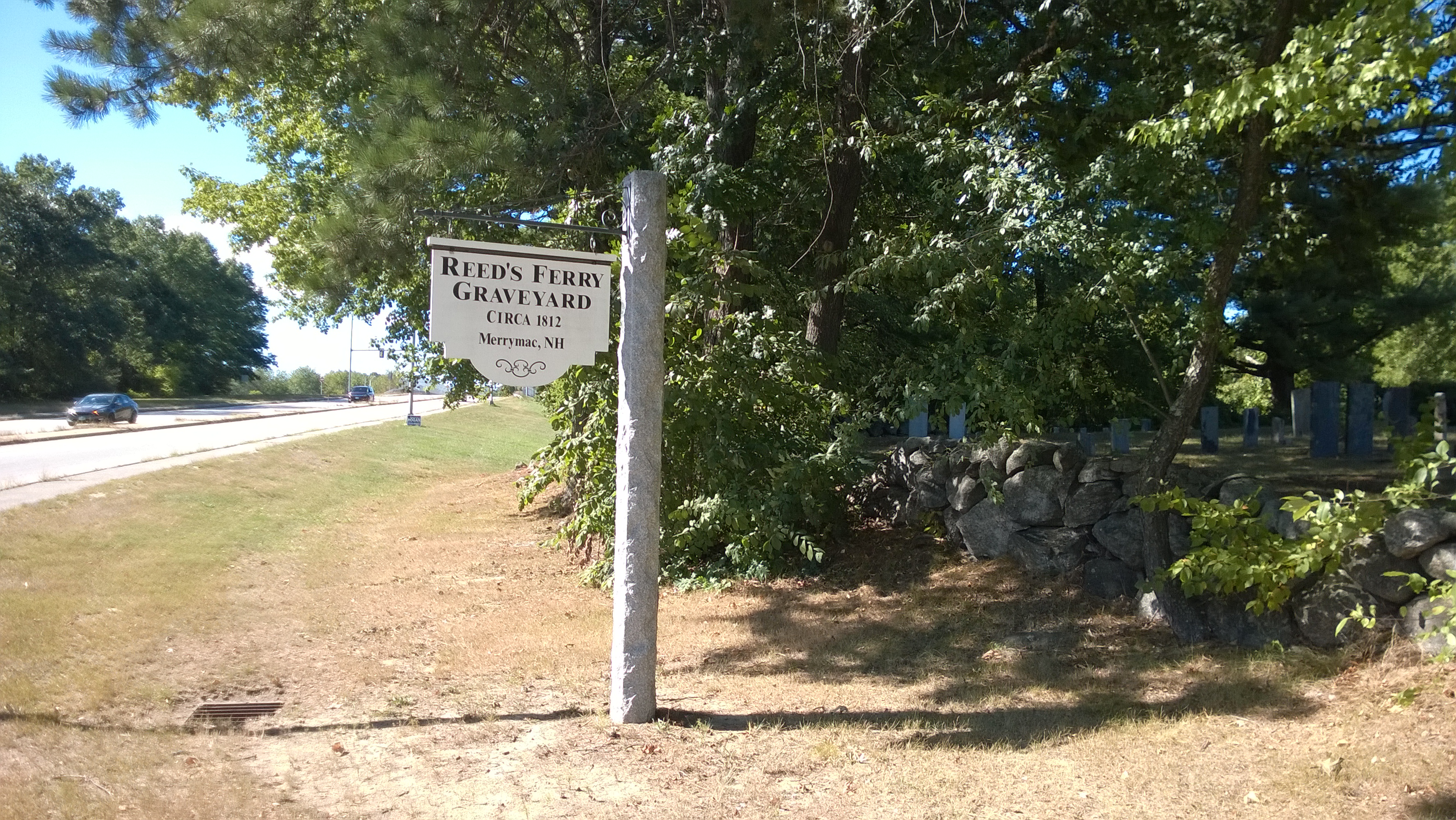
Reeds Ferry cemetery

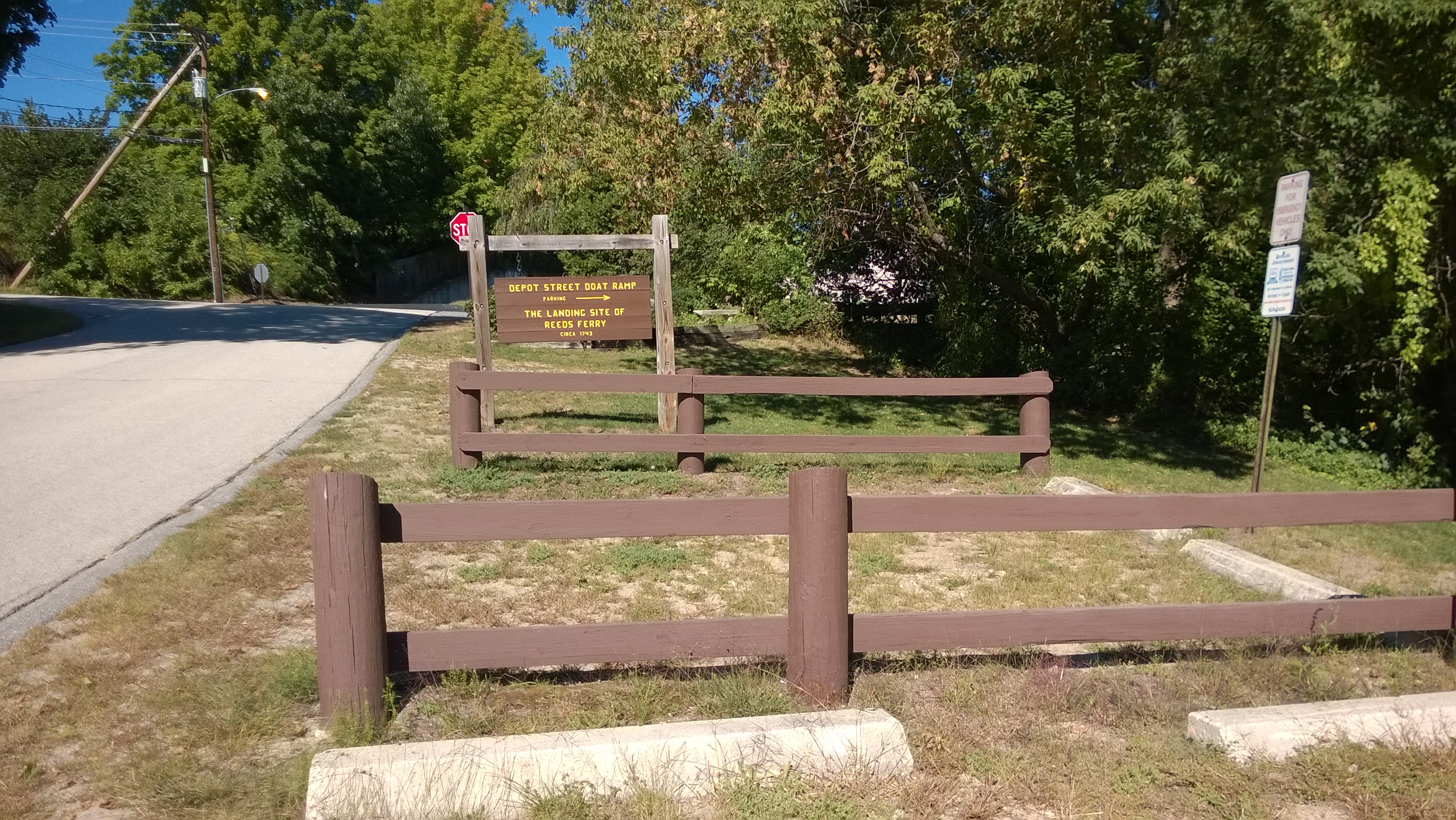
Parking for the boat ramp, former ferry landing site

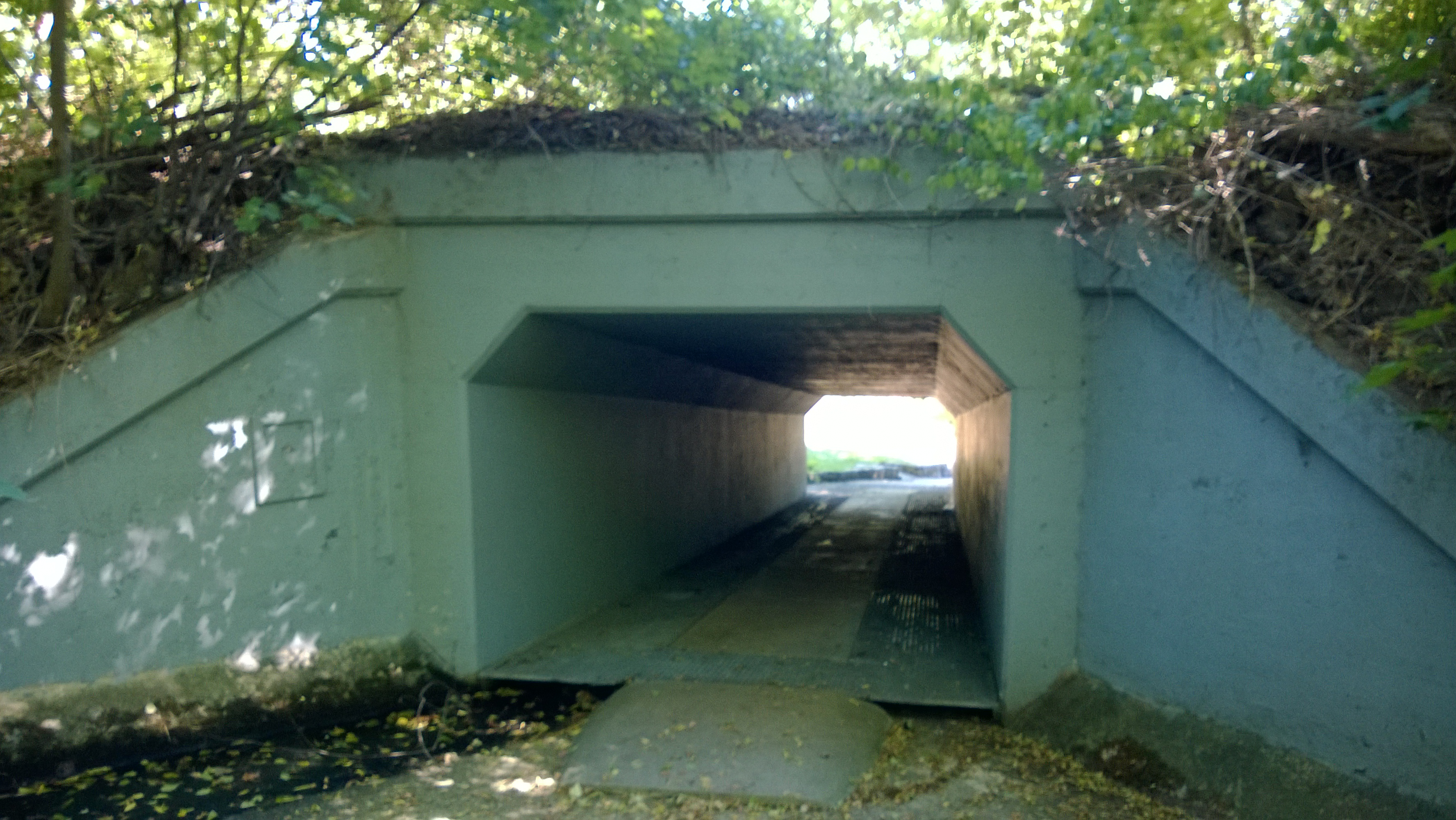
Viaduct at boat launch site leading to ferry landing site

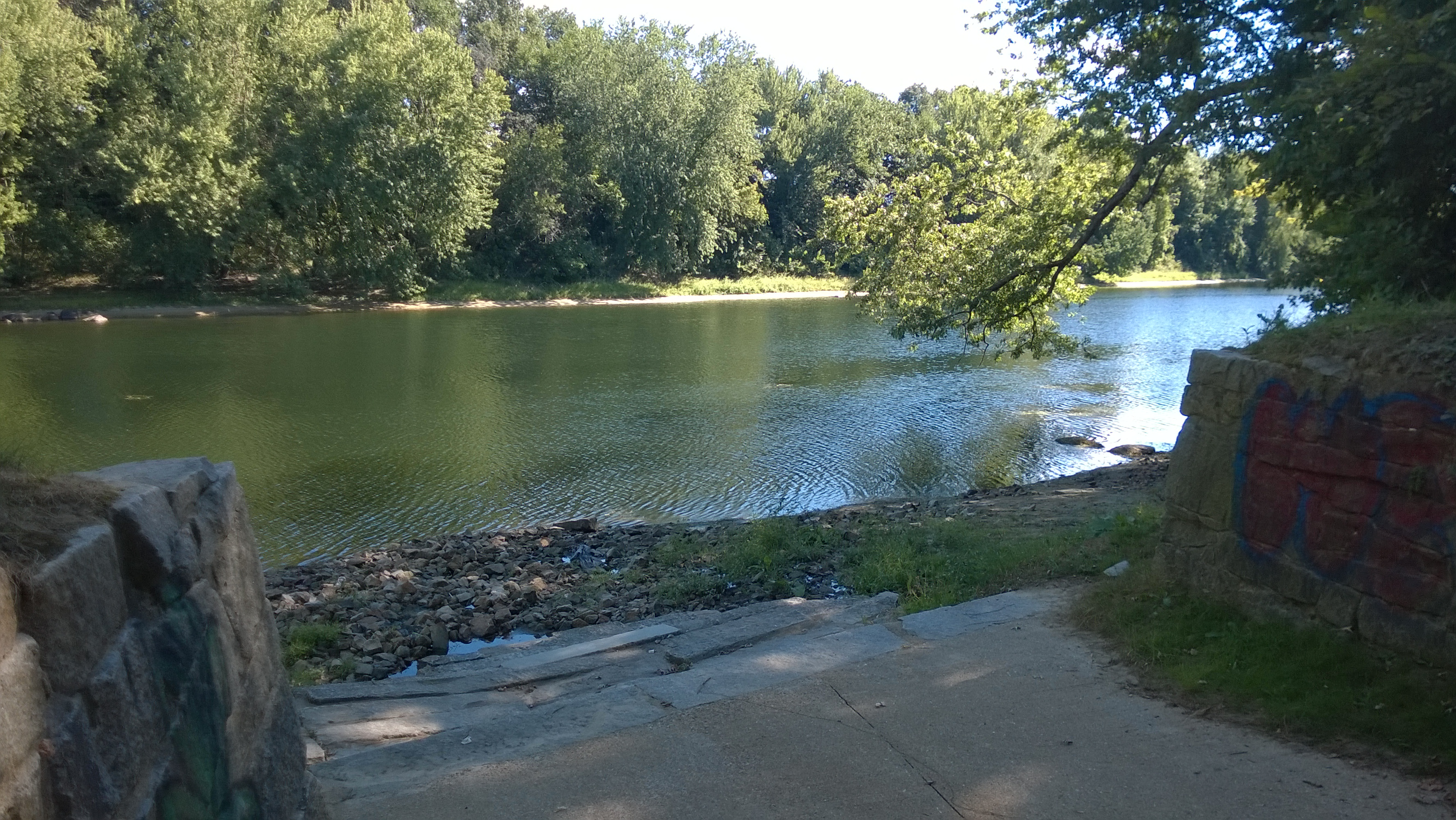
Looking across the Merrimack River to Litchfield from the boat launch

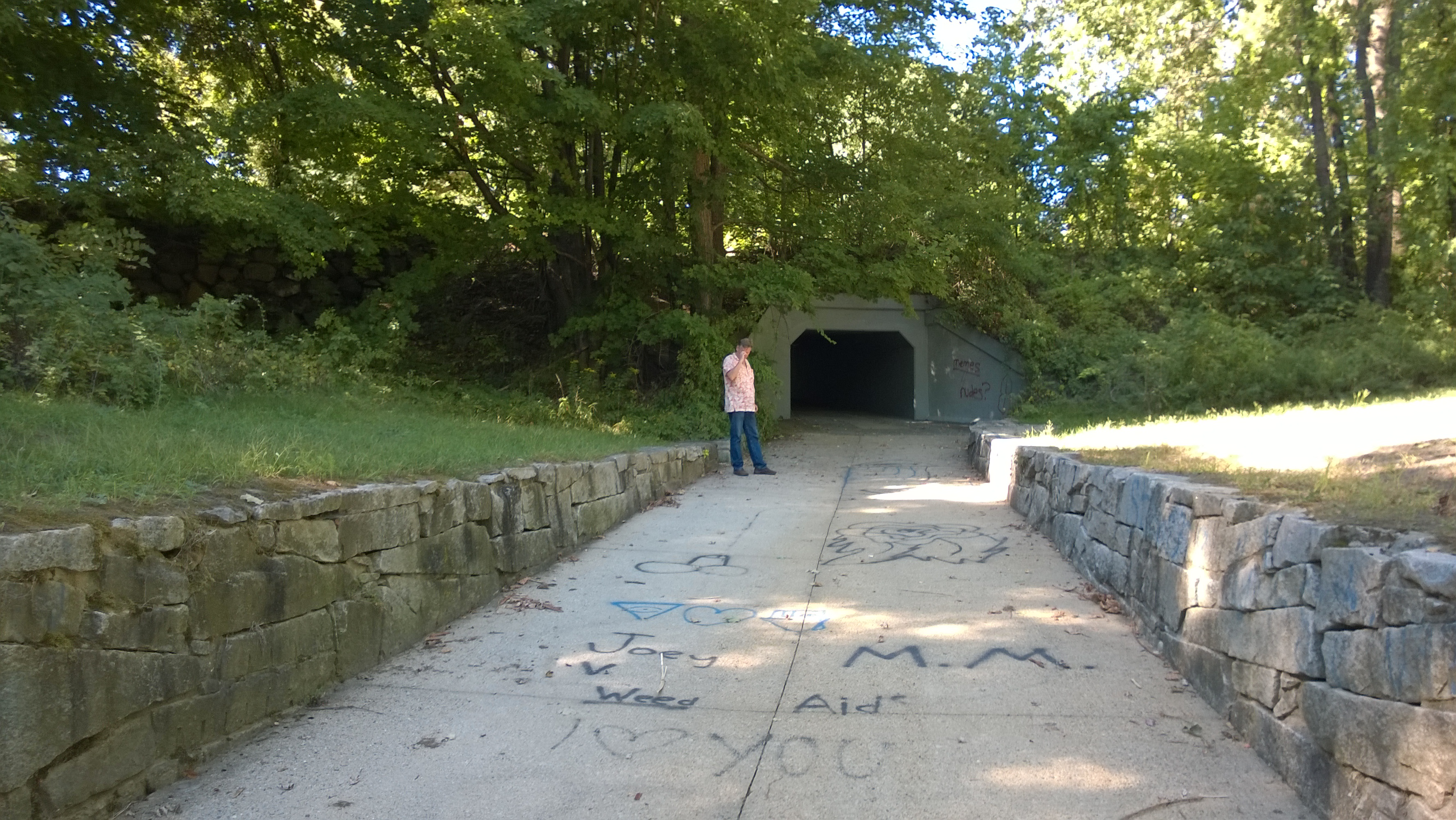
View from boat ramp to railway viaduct

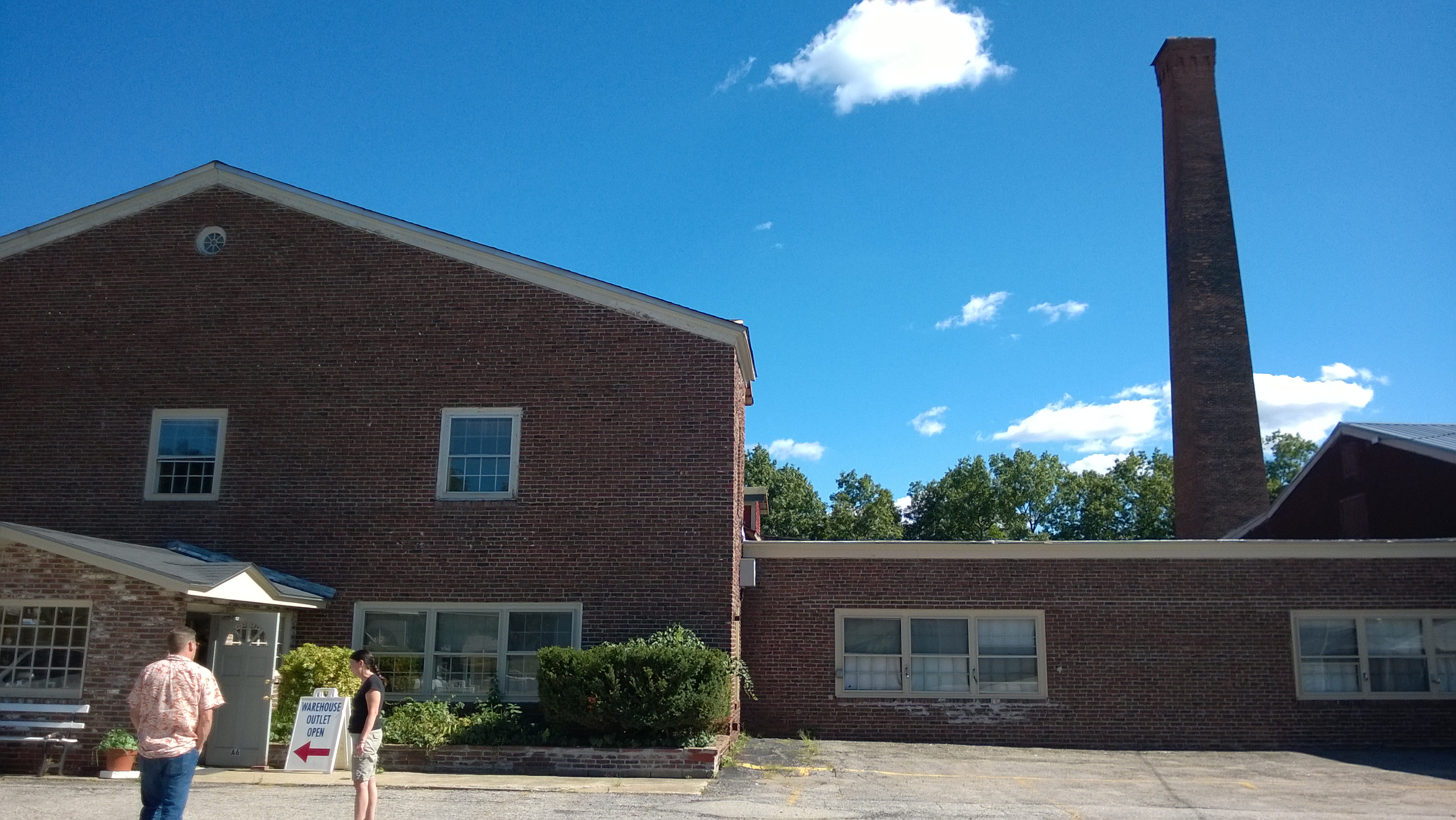
Former lumber mill in Reeds Ferry

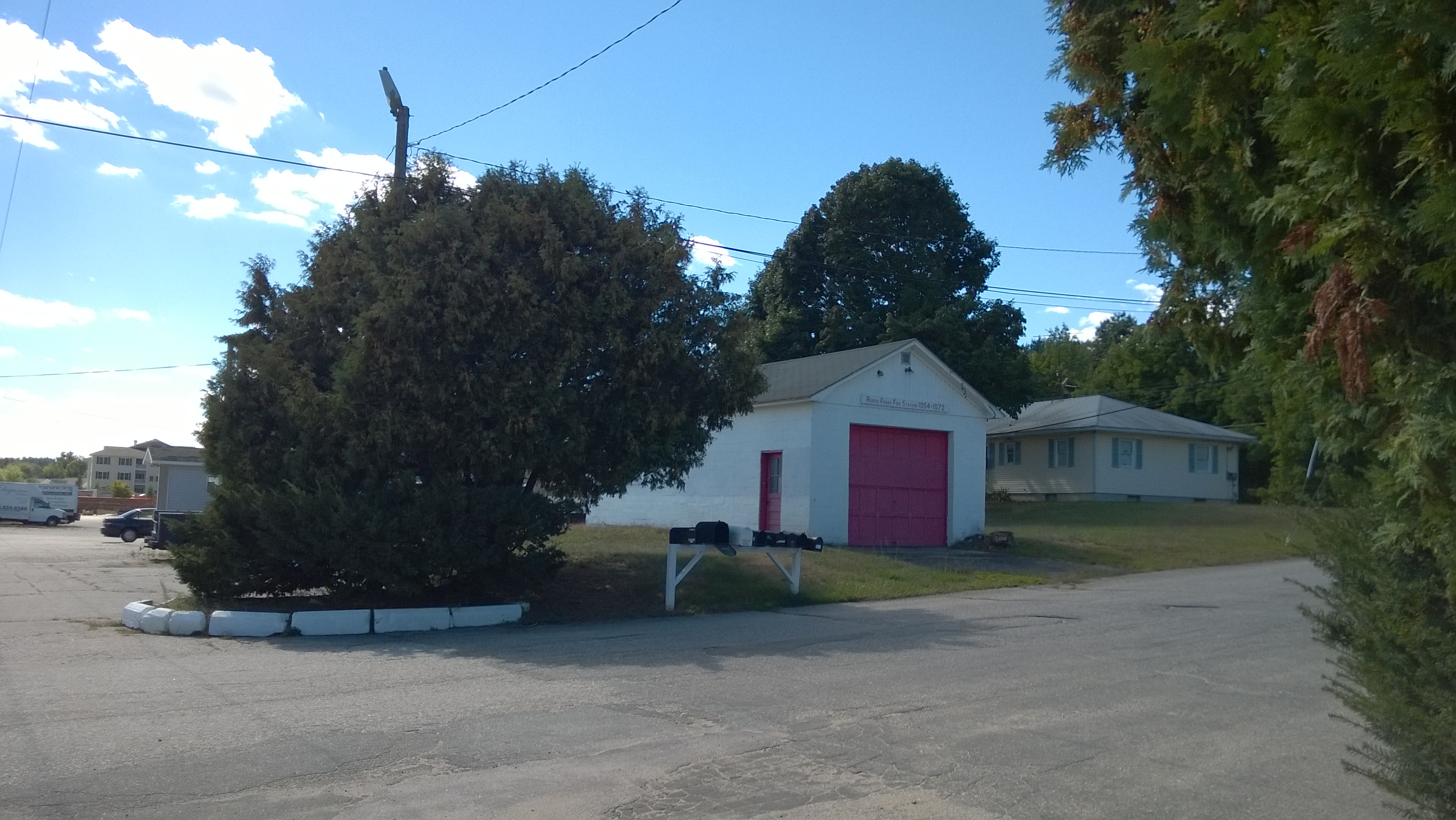
Former fire station across from the former lumber mill
