= Merrimack, New Hampshire =

- Town
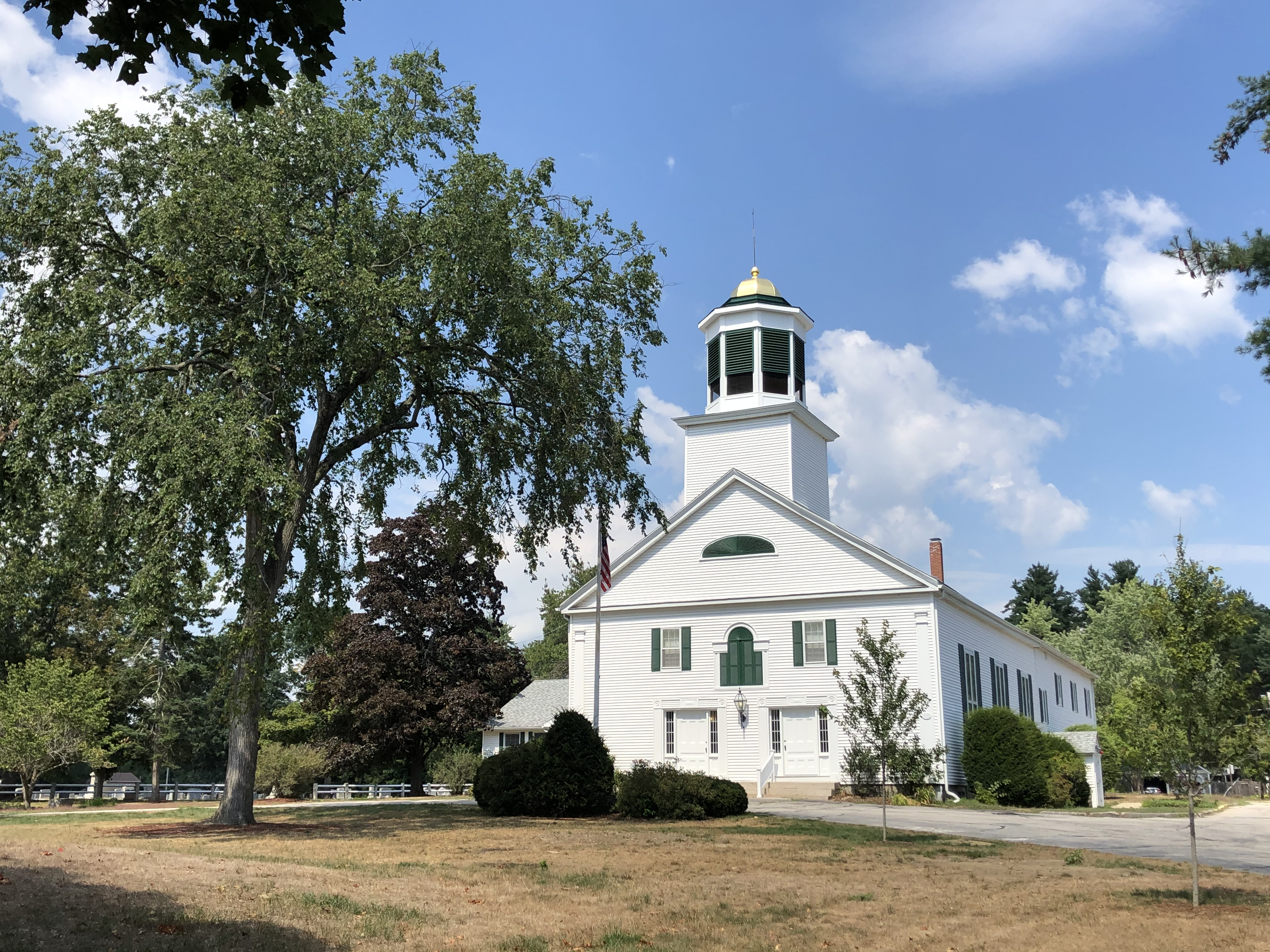
- First Church of Merrimack

- Seal
- Motto: One Town...Four Villages
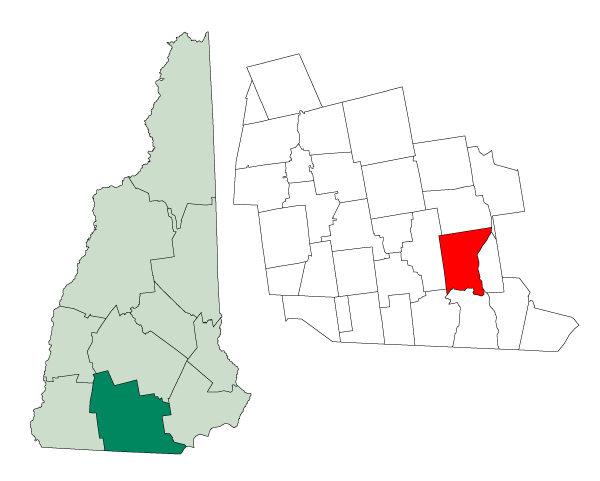
- Location in Hillsborough County, New Hampshire
- Coordinates: 42°51′59″N 71°29′37″W
- Country: United States
- State: New Hampshire
- County: Hillsborough
- Settled: 1673
- Incorporated: April 2, 1746
- Villages: Merrimack; Reeds Ferry; South Merrimack; Thorntons Ferry

Area
  - Total: 33.4 sq mi (86.6 km^{2})
  - Land: 32.6 sq mi (84.4 km^{2})
  - Water: 0.85 sq mi (2.2 km^{2}) 2.55%
- Elevation: 213 ft (65 m)

Population (2020)
  - Total: 26,632
  - Density: 817/sq mi (315.6/km^{2})
- Time zone: UTC−5 (Eastern)
  - Summer (DST): UTC−4 (Eastern)
- ZIP code: 03054
- Area code: 603
- FIPS code: 33-47540
- GNIS feature ID: 873663
- Website: www.merrimacknh.gov

Merrimack is a town in Hillsborough County, New Hampshire, United States. The population was 26,632 as of the 2020 census.

There are four villages in the town: Merrimack Village (formerly known as Souhegan Village), Thorntons Ferry, Reeds Ferry, and South Merrimack. It also contains the census-designated place of East Merrimack.

== History ==
The first known settlers of the area appeared sometime after the last ice age. Merrimack is a Native American term meaning sturgeon, a type of fish. The Pennacook people named the Merrimack River after this fish because of the vast population that once existed there. The Pennacooks spelled it Monnomoke or Merramake. "When the town was incorporated, it took the name of the river and spelled it Merrymac," according to the Merrimack Historical Society.

The first mention of the territory containing the current town of Merrimack among written records was the petition of Passaconaway to the General Court of Massachusetts for a grant of land to include a part of this region. This was in 1662. In the autumn of that year, the court acceded to the request, and the aged sachem and his associates were granted a strip of country a mile and a half wide on both banks of the Merrimack at this section of the river. Although the boundaries of this grant are not specifically known today, it is probable that the chieftain held at least a portion of the current town of Merrimack. European settlers first came to the area in the late 17th century when the area was still in dispute between the Province of New Hampshire and Massachusetts Bay Colony.

The town of Merrimack was originally part of the 1673 Dunstable grant. On June 25, 1734, Massachusetts granted the town organization as "Naticook", which was made up of Litchfield and part of Merrimack. In 1746 the boundary line between Massachusetts and New Hampshire was revised, and the land which was originally part of Massachusetts became part of New Hampshire. When it went back into New Hampshire, the province disincorporated the towns of Dunstable, Naticook, and Nottingham and formed it into one giant territory again, roughly the size of the old Dunstable Grant from the 1670s.

On April 2, 1746, Governor Benning Wentworth signed a charter establishing that the land from Pennichuck Brook to the Souhegan River became the Town of Merrymac. At that time fewer than 50 families lived here. Pawtucket, Nashaway and Pennacook people camped along the banks of the Merrimack and Souhegan rivers. The Pennacooks were greatest in numbers, and their chief, Passaconaway, was the ruler of all the tribes in the Merrimack Valley. On June 5, 1750, the town's charter was ratified, giving the town an additional 3 miles (5 km) to the north. The new portion called "Souhegan East" was made up of the land north of the Souhegan River.

Matthew Thornton, a signer of the Declaration of Independence, lived and was buried in Merrimack. The Signer's House and Matthew Thornton Cemetery are still located in the town.

The original meetinghouse was built at the exact center of town. There were two cemeteries. Turkey Hill on Meetinghouse Road is the first mentioned in the town records, but Thornton Cemetery on Route 3 has the oldest gravestone.

The nineteenth century saw much growth in Merrimack. The meetinghouse was too small and too far from what had become the center of town. The church and government became separate and two new churches were built in more convenient locations, one in South Merrimack and one on Baboosic Lake Road. A new town hall was built to replace the meetinghouse.

The Boston and Maine Railroad laid tracks through the town in the 19th century, with several stations operating until the mid-20th century, when the advent of the automobile transformed Merrimack from a largely agricultural community to a bedroom community of Boston and nearby cities in New Hampshire. Since 1970 the town has been the home of an Anheuser-Busch brewery, their easternmost, and one of their smallest plants in the United States. It is home to a brewery tour and one of the five stables for the Budweiser Clydesdales.

The Merrimack School Board attracted national attention in 1995 when it passed a "prohibition of alternative lifestyle instruction" act, which resulted in the removal of a work by William Shakespeare from the school curriculum. The board members who supported the act were voted out in the subsequent board election.

== Geography ==
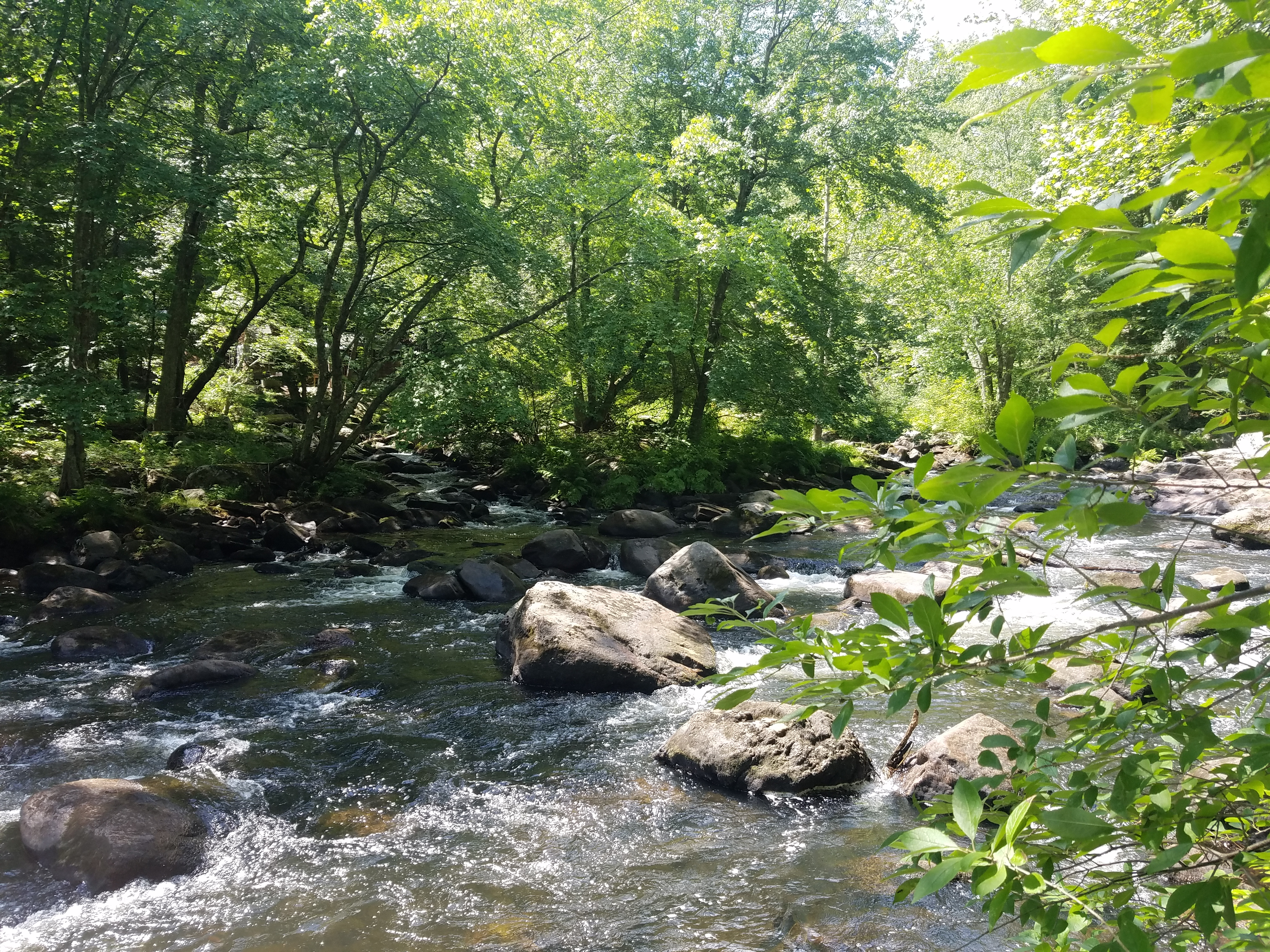
The Souhegan River in Wildcat Falls Conservation Area

According to the United States Census Bureau, the town has a total area of 33.4 square miles (86.6 km^{2}), of which 32.6 square miles (84.4 km^{2}) are land and 0.85 square miles (2.2 km^{2}) are water, comprising 2.55% of the town. The highest point in Merrimack is an unnamed hill in the northwestern part of town that reaches 512 feet (156 m) above sea level.

=== Adjacent municipalities ===
- Bedford, New Hampshire (north)
- Manchester, New Hampshire (northeast)
- Litchfield, New Hampshire (east)
- Nashua, New Hampshire (south)
- Hollis, New Hampshire (southwest)
- Amherst, New Hampshire (west)

=== Areas of Merrimack ===
Shadows of the former villages that now make Merrimack still exist. However, the boundaries and exact definitions are unclear due to the expansion of suburban development in the town during the latter half of the 20th century.

==== Thorntons Ferry ====
The area of town near Naticook Lake and Continental Boulevard, its name comes from Matthew Thornton, one of the signers of the Declaration of Independence who lived in Merrimack and is now buried in a cemetery near the intersection of Daniel Webster Highway (U.S. Route 3) and Greeley Street. Thorntons Ferry Elementary School is located on Camp Sargent Road.

==== Reeds Ferry ====
The northern portion of the town, Reeds Ferry is centered on the current intersection of Bedford Road and Daniel Webster Highway. The boundaries of the area are unclear, as the northwestern part of town near Baboosic Lake is not traditionally considered a portion of Reeds Ferry. While as a defined village it was located mostly near the Merrimack River, the area near Baboosic Lake may now possibly be seen as part of Reeds Ferry. Reeds Ferry Elementary School is located on Lyons Road.

==== South Merrimack ====
Centered on Pennichuck Square on Rte. 101A and Continental Boulevard, South Merrimack is usually considered to be the southwestern part of town near Rte. 101A and Boston Post Road. However, the southeastern portion of town near Harris Pond might also be considered part of South Merrimack or Thornton's Ferry.

==== Merrimack Village ====
The center of town is not known as "Merrimack Village" per se, but constitutes the area between the more defined Reeds Ferry and Thorntons Ferry areas. Largely considered to be located at the Public Library on the corner of Baboosic Lake Road and Daniel Webster Highway, Merrimack Village was built along the Souhegan River that roughly cuts the current town in half. The elementary school in this part of town is named after James Mastricola, who deeded the land to the town upon his death. One of the three elementary schools, the upper elementary school, Merrimack High School, the library, and the current town hall, among other buildings, are all located on the land formerly owned by Mastricola.

The "village" is considered to extend westward to the Amherst border. This is due in large part to the former Town Meetinghouse, which was located on the corner of Turkey Hill Road and Meetinghouse Road.

== Demographics ==
Historical population
Census	Pop.	Note	%±
1790	819		—
1800	926		13.1%
1810	1,048		13.2%
1820	1,162		10.9%
1830	1,191		2.5%
1840	1,113		−6.5%
1850	1,250		12.3%
1860	1,119		−10.5%
1870	1,066		−4.7%
1880	1,042		−2.3%
1890	951		−8.7%
1900	1,234		29.8%
1910	1,039		−15.8%
1920	1,022		−1.6%
1930	1,084		6.1%
1940	1,253		15.6%
1950	1,908		52.3%
1960	2,989		56.7%
1970	8,595		187.6%
1980	15,406		79.2%
1990	22,156		43.8%
2000	25,119		13.4%
2010	25,494		1.5%
2020	26,632		4.5%
2024 (est.)	29,367		10.3%
U.S. Decennial Census

As of the 2010 census, there were 25,494 people, 9,503 households, and 7,150 families residing in the town. There were 9,818 housing units, of which 315, or 3.2%, were vacant. The racial makeup of the town was 95.0% White, 0.8% African American, 0.2% Native American, 2.0% Asian, <0.1% Native Hawaiian or Pacific Islander, 0.5% some other race, and 1.6% from two or more races. 2.1% of the population were Hispanic or Latino of any race.

Of the 9,503 households, 36.7% had children under the age of 18 living with them, 62.6% were headed by married couples living together, 8.5% had a female householder with no husband present, and 24.8% were non-families. 18.8% of all households were made up of individuals, and 5.7% were someone living alone who was 65 years of age or older. The average household size was 2.67, and the average family size was 3.06.

In the town, 24.5% of the population were under the age of 18, 6.7% were from 18 to 24, 25.7% from 25 to 44, 32.7% from 45 to 64, and 10.3% were 65 years of age or older. The median age was 40.7 years. For every 100 females, there were 99.0 males. For every 100 females age 18 and over, there were 96.4 males.

For the period 2011–2015, the estimated median annual income for a household was $90,708, and the median income for a family was $101,786. Male full-time workers had a median income of $69,937 versus $50,184 for females. The per capita income for the town was $39,695. 4.0% of the population and 2.3% of families were below the poverty line. 4.7% of the population under the age of 18 and 4.4% of those 65 or older were living in poverty.

== Economy ==
PC Connection and Brookstone are based in Merrimack. Merrimack Canoe Company was started in Merrimack before being relocated to Tennessee. Other notable employers include Fidelity Investments, Anheuser-Busch, Campers Inn, and BAE Systems.

Merrimack's largest employers (2019)
Business	Product/service	Employees	Established
Fidelity Investments	Financial services	6,000	1996
Connections, Inc.	Computer resale	1,077	1998
Merrimack Premium Outlets	Retail stores	900	2012
BAE Systems	Defense systems	816	1988
Merrimack School District	Education	800	–
Atrium Maquet Getinge Group	Sterile medical manufacturing	700	2013
Anheuser-Busch, Inc.	Brewery, distribution	531	1970
Kollsman/Elbit Systems of America	Electro-optics	500	1991
Brookstone, Inc	Mail order marketer/retailer	256	
St. Gobain	PTFE coated fabrics	253	1984

Opened in 2012, the Merrimack Premium Outlets are a 560,000-square-foot (52,000 m^{2}) retail mall area with 12 buildings, parking lots, and other site improvements located off exit 10 of the Everett Turnpike.

== Education ==
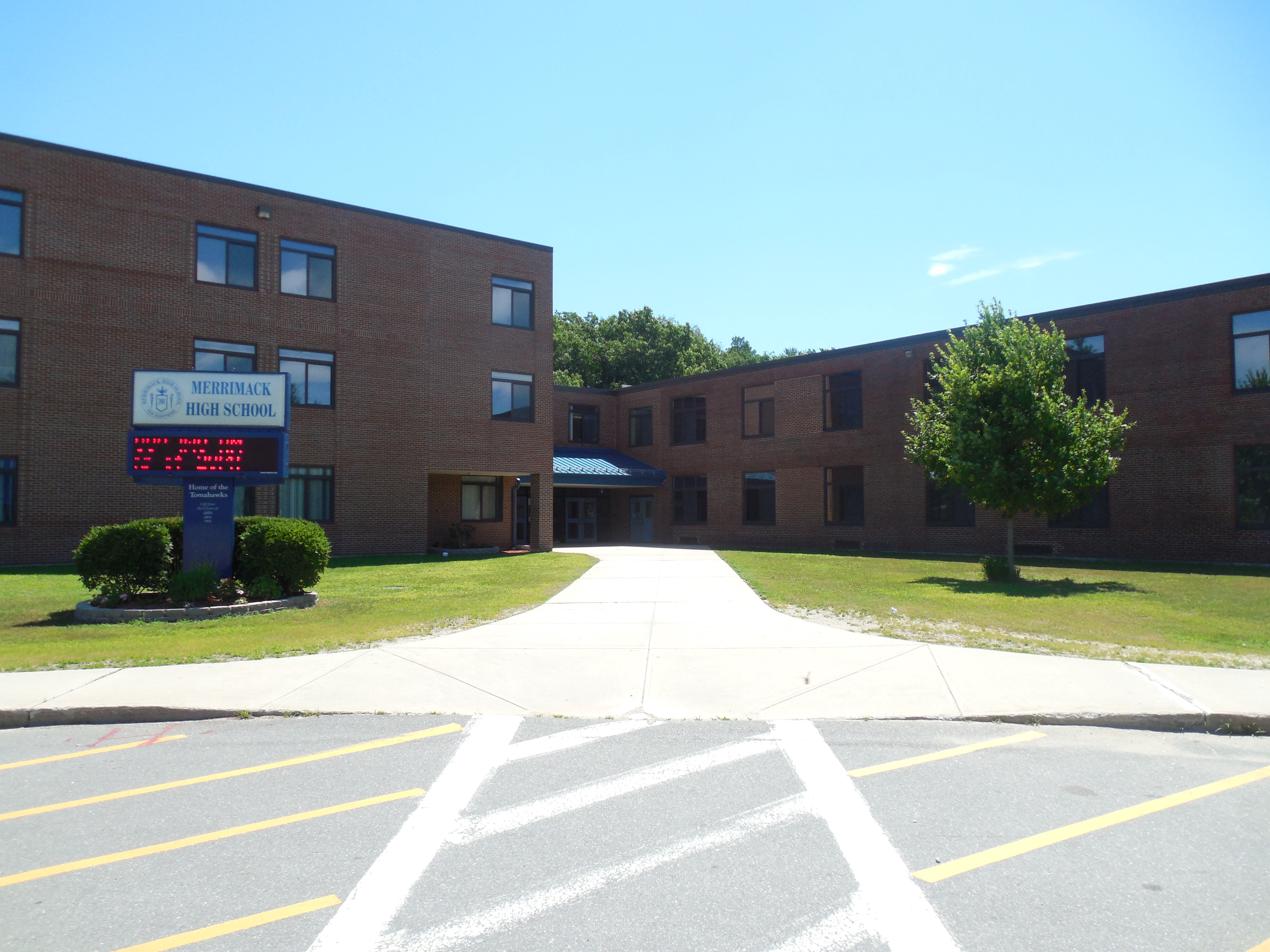
Merrimack High School

The six public schools in Merrimack are managed by the Merrimack School District and include Thorntons Ferry Elementary School, Reeds Ferry Elementary School, James Mastricola Elementary School, James Mastricola Upper Elementary School, Merrimack Middle School and Merrimack High School.

Merrimack High School has won one state championship in baseball (2007), three in softball (1980, 1988, 2001), one in football (1987), two in soccer (1998 girls, 2008 boys), three in indoor track (1999, 2007, 2008), four in outdoor track (2003, 2004, 2006, 2007), one in cross-country (2006), one in girls lacrosse (2012), one in skiing (1979), two in volleyball (2001, 2014), and four in basketball (1967, 2003, 2004, 2012).

The Academy for Science and Design was a charter school established for the 2007–2008 academic year; it was New Hampshire's first charter school to concentrate on science, math, engineering, and design and is free of tuition fees. The school has since moved to Nashua. In 2014, the Gate City Charter School for the Arts opened its doors to students.

Also within the town lies the Thomas More College of Liberal Arts. The college is consistently ranked among the top liberal arts schools in the country.

== Annual events ==
The Rock'N Ribfest, hosted by the Nashua West Rotary Club, was an annual event held from 2003 through 2018, the proceeds of which benefited many local charities. In 2019 the event was hosted by the Merrimack Rotary Club and renamed the Great American Ribfest and Food Truck Festival. The ribfest is held on the Anheuser-Busch grounds in Merrimack and features BBQ, children's games and activities, music, and other entertainment.

== Government ==
The town government consists of a seven-member town council. This form of government was adopted by a ballot measure on May 25, 2006. More information on Merrimack's local government can be found at Charter commission website.

Each March, the town conducts two deliberative sessions (school and general) to decide what warrant articles will be on the Town General Election ballot in April, one of which is always election of town officers, and another is the budget. If the budget is not approved by the voters, the town's governing council either holds an emergency hearing regarding a new budget or goes forward with the priors years' budget, amended with any time-sensitive information pending upon the current year.

The Merrimack Village District administers the water system that serves the central area of the town.

As a large, suburban community located directly between the state's two largest cities (Manchester and Nashua), Merrimack plays a disproportionate role to its size every four years in the New Hampshire primary; in the Fourth of July celebrations preceding presidential elections, many presidential candidates have marched or had floats in the town's Fourth of July parade.

In the New Hampshire Senate, Merrimack is in the 11th district and is currently represented by Democrat Shannon Chandley. On the New Hampshire Executive Council, Merrimack is in district 5 and is currently represented by Republican Dave Wheeler. In the U.S. House of Representatives, Merrimack is included in New Hampshire's 1st congressional district and is currently represented by Democrat Chris Pappas.

Merrimack leans Republican in presidential elections, but in recent years has shifted to become a battleground town. In 2020, Joe Biden was the first Democrat to carry the town with a majority of votes since Lyndon B. Johnson's landslide victory in 1964.

Republicans currently hold five of the town's eight seats in the General Court. The current General Court district of Merrimack is Hillsborough 12.

=== Proposed detention facility ===
On December 24, 2025, The Washington Post published an article claiming the Department of Homeland Security (DHS) was planning to use a "large warehouse" in Merrimack for the purpose of immigrant detention as a part of the Trump Administration's immigration crackdown. New Hampshire state officials and town officials in Merrimack stated they were unaware of the federal government's plans, with Merrimack town manager, Paul Micali, stating "he had no knowledge of an ICE facility coming to Merrimack". On January 8, 2026, WMUR reported governor Kelly Ayotte "has not been notified or consulted about rumored plans for an Immigration and Customs Enforcement facility in Merrimack", with Ayotte stating New Hampshire's "Department of Safety is in contact with the Department of Homeland Security all the time, and we haven't heard any notification of that". A large protest was held at the reported site of the warehouse on January 8, 2026, with several more planned in the coming months.

On February 3, 2026, WMUR and New Hampshire Public Radio reported the American Civil Liberties Union (ACLU) of New Hampshire had filed a public records request with the Division of Historical Resources (NHDHR) regarding documents relating to the facility in Merrimack, revealing that the NHDHS and the DHS had been working together to secure the warehouse in Merrimack for the purpose of immigrant detention as early as January 12, 2026. Ayotte's office released a letter stating "[i]t is entirely unacceptable that the Department of Natural and Cultural Resources failed to share this information with the governor's office", though NHDHR commissioner Sarah Stewart "indicated she was not notified either", later writing "I, as Commissioner, take full responsibility for this failure of process within my agency". The revelation led to Stewart's resignation the following day and an outcry from the Executive Council of New Hampshire, state lawmakers, and the public. On February 12, 2026, Ayotte released two documents she said she received from DHS detailing the "Detention Reengineering Initiative". The document's opening paragraph contained an erroneous line referencing the facility's impact on "the Oklahoma economy", which drew criticism from news outlets. The error was corrected by DHS shortly thereafter. Ayotte did not publicly disclose when she had been given these documents from DHS.

On February 6, 2026, during a Senate Committee on Homeland Security and Governmental Affairs hearing, New Hampshire Senator Maggie Hassan questioned acting ICE Director Todd Lyons about the proposed facility. Lyons claimed that he "had shared an economic impact summary of the potential facility in Merrimack with Ayotte", though Ayotte later refuted this. Lyons also stated that DHS "would not" cancel plans to use the facility for immigration detention due to community opposition. The proposed facility was condemned by the public and local lawmakers, with Merrimack representative in the New Hampshire House of Representatives, Bill Boyd, writing DHS Secretary Kristi Noem a letter opposing the facility.

On February 24, 2026, Ayotte announced that DHS would no longer be establishing the detention facility in Merrimack. After meeting with Noem, Ayotte stated "I thank Secretary Noem for hearing the concerns of the Town of Merrimack and for the continued cooperation between DHS and New Hampshire law enforcement".

== Notable people ==
- Laurene Allen (born 1962), environmental activist and winner of the 2025 Goldman Environmental Prize
- Mickey Gasper (born 1995), professional baseball player; born in Merrimack
- Christy Karacas (born 1975), creator of Superjail! and director of Robotomy; born in Merrimack
- Walter Kittredge (1834–1905), Civil War-era musician
- David Lozeau, artist, children's book writer
- Tim Schaller (born 1990), former NHL player
- Forrest Sherman (1896–1951), admiral in the United States Navy who served as Chief of Naval Operations
- Matthew Thornton (1714–1803), Founding Father, signer of the United States Declaration of Independence
- Matthew Brown, member of the New Hampshire House of Representatives
