= Mark Kistler's Imagination Station =

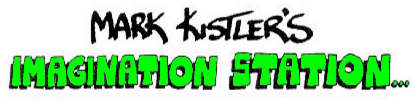
- Country of origin: United States

Original release
- Network: PBS Member Stations
- Release: October 14, 1991 – July 10, 1998

Mark Kistler's Imagination Station is a public television series where artist Mark Kistler taught children and adults to draw using techniques such as perspective and shading. The program was originally presented by TV station KIXE in the Redding and Chico areas of the U.S. state of California. Kistler also released some publications of teaching techniques used in the show. It had a short reprise later in the 1990s but did not continue to run past a few episodes.

The show ran for 65 episodes, starting on October 14, 1991 to July 10, 1998, and after cancellation, reruns aired until August 6, 1999. In the summer of 2009 Kistler filmed additional shows that began airing on PBS in the fall of 2009.
