= The Secret City =

Television program for children

- Genre: Children
- No. of episodes: 65

Production
- Running time: 27 minutes
- Production company: Children's Video Associates

Original release
- Network: PBS
- Release: September 2 – November 29, 1985

The Secret City is a television series designed to teach children how to draw.

The series was produced by Children's Video Associates and was recorded at Maryland Public Television's Owings Mills studio in cooperation with MPT who originally distributed the show to the national Public Broadcasting System for syndication via satellite. It aired on PBS and TVOntario in the late 1980s. The original Secret City show was later distributed by San Diego's KPBS as part of a deal for them to distribute the follow-up mini series The New Secret City Adventures.

The series starred Mark Kistler as Commander Mark who led viewers through various drawing exercises and examples. It also featured other characters, including Zebtron, Metaman and Cindy the Dragon. The show's primary goal was to teach children how to draw—specifically using perspective techniques, and imaginative elements.
