= Mark Kistler =

American artist

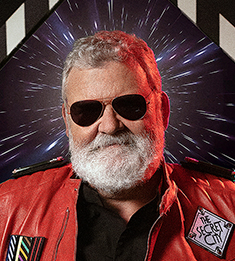
Kistler in 2023

Mark Kistler is an American artist who hosts drawing instruction programs for children, young adults, and their parents to teach the freedom and joy of drawing.

== Career ==
He was inspired as a 15-year-old by Napoleon Hill's book "Think and Grow Rich." He wanted to follow his passion of teaching children to draw. He set a goal of teaching 1,000,000 children to draw by the age of 18. Stopping short at 400,000 on his 18th birthday re-set his goal to hit the million mark at 21 and continued teaching hundreds of kids at schools. In 1983 wanting to address the lack of drawing specific how-to-videos in art stores he began to approach video production companies to create a drawing program to make drawing accessible. One of the production companies he approached was already preparing to produce a children's painting program, upon learning about the opportunity Mark convinced the company to change their focus citing the lack of available programming specifically geared to drawing techniques. The show developed into Children's Video Associates 1985 production The Secret City which was recorded at Maryland Public Television and aired on PBS.

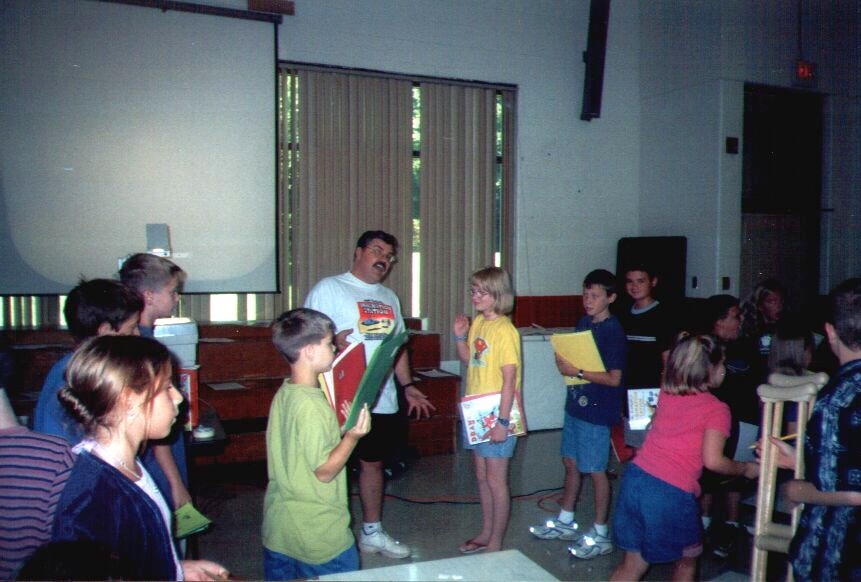
Mark Kistler at Martinsburg, WV with a group of school children in Sept 2001.

Mark starred as the host Commander Mark, an enthusiastic space man teaching drawing techniques to viewers at home and the on-screen characters Zebtron, Metaman and Cindy the Dragon. The show was broadcast to 11 million PBS viewers each week, far surpassing his original one million student goal. His art style is a cartoon 3D style that is focused on basic drawing techniques such as foreshortening, shading, surface, size, overlapping, contour, and density. His first book "Mark Kistler's Draw Squad" was released in 1988. In 1990, Mark was brought back to host a new Public Television program "Mark Kistler's Imagination Station." The show demonstrated to viewers techniques on how to Draw-In-3D and having fun while doing it.

In 2010 Mark was awarded a regional Emmy for the series episode, “Sammy Sea Turtle and The Mermaid,” in the category of best Instructional/Informational Program for "teaching kids to draw in 3-D while imparting messages of self-esteem, and appreciation for literature, science, classic art and the environment. He continues to teach students in classroom settings, has produced several drawing books and DVDs, and currently hosts live and streaming drawing tutorial videos to members through a subscription model on his website. His use of enthusiastic tag lines for viewers such as "Draw, draw, draw!", "Art Attack!", "Art Animals!!", "Yeeeeahhh", "Sharpen your pencils!", "pencil power!", and "Dream it, draw it, do it!" continue to be referenced as inspiration for other artists such as Jerzy Drozd, Lee Cherolis and Mike Krahulik of Penny Arcade.

== Commander Mark ==
He portrayed Commander Mark in The Secret City, a fictional space-themed series where he taught child viewers skills and vocabulary to become better artists. Each episode included a segment where Mark would add to a large 4-foot by 8-foot mural that was added to each episode using a technique or several techniques learned throughout the series. The mural was inspired by his mother, who let him and his brother draw a mural in their childhood bedroom when they were young adolescents. The mural from the show had to be re-created 20 episodes into the production of the original 65 episodes due to broadcast cameras not being able to pick up the fine-lined artwork on the original light-colored background. The mural color was changed to a dark orange and had to be re-drawn by Mark by tracing over the original. Following the production MPT station VP Michael Styer and friend, co-creator, and executive producer Robert Neustadt allowed Mark to keep the entire mural. The mural was so large it had to be shipped freight in a large crate to contain the 8-foot completed artwork. It currently hangs in his mother's classroom at Carlsbad High School in Carlsbad, California until Mark plans to relocate it to his home in Houston, Texas.

== Television series ==
- The Secret City
- Mark Kistler's Imagination Station
- Imagination Station: The New Generation
