= Matthew Thornton =

American politician from New Hampshire and Founding Father (1714–1803)

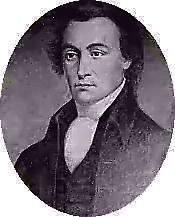
- Born: March 3, 1714; Ireland
- Died: June 24, 1803 (aged 89); Newburyport, Massachusetts, U.S.
- Resting place: Thornton Cemetery, Merrimack, New Hampshire
- Known for: Signer of the United States Declaration of Independence

Signature
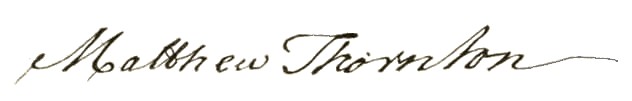

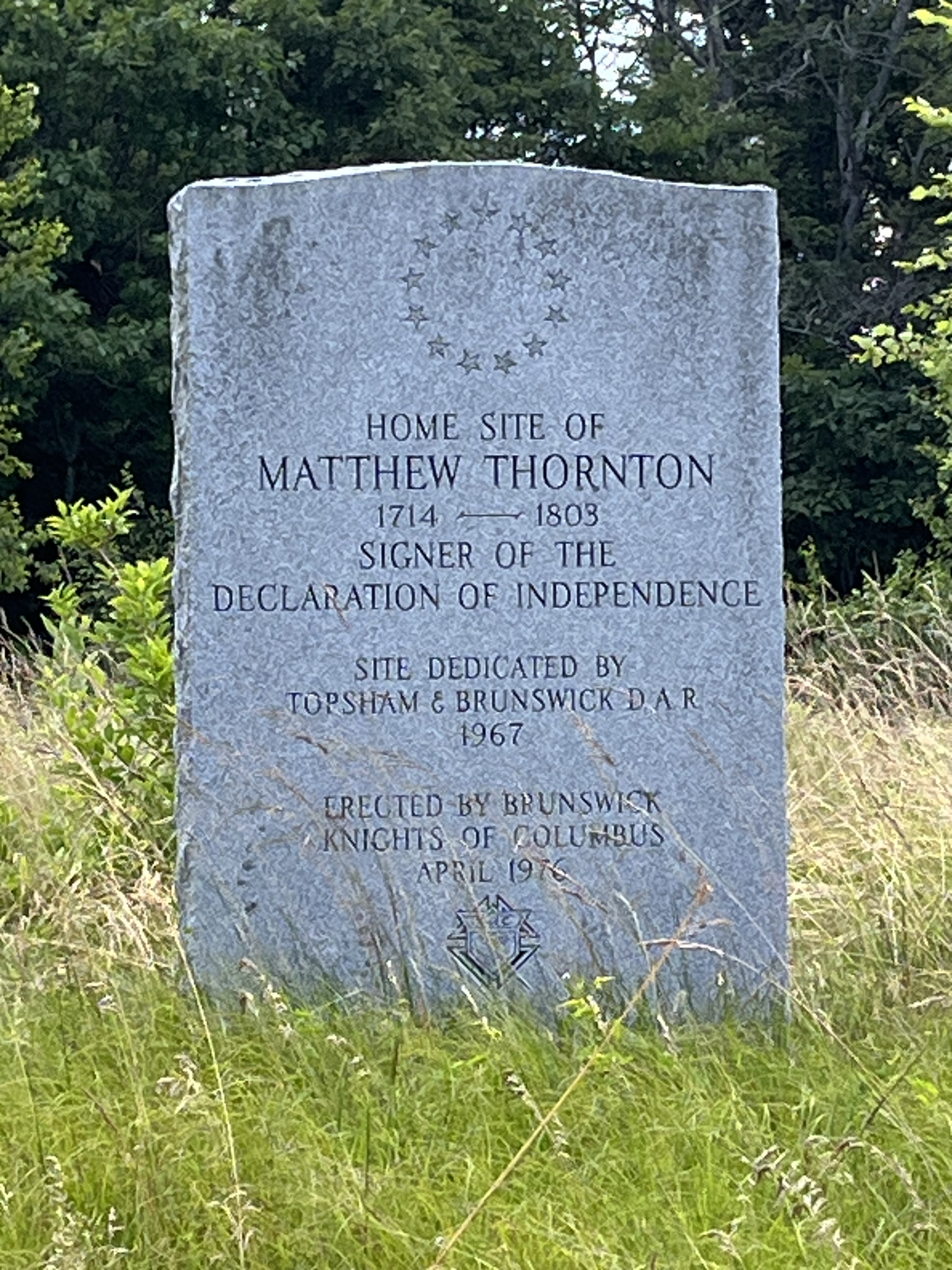
Site of Matthew Thorton’s childhood homestead in Brunswick, Maine.

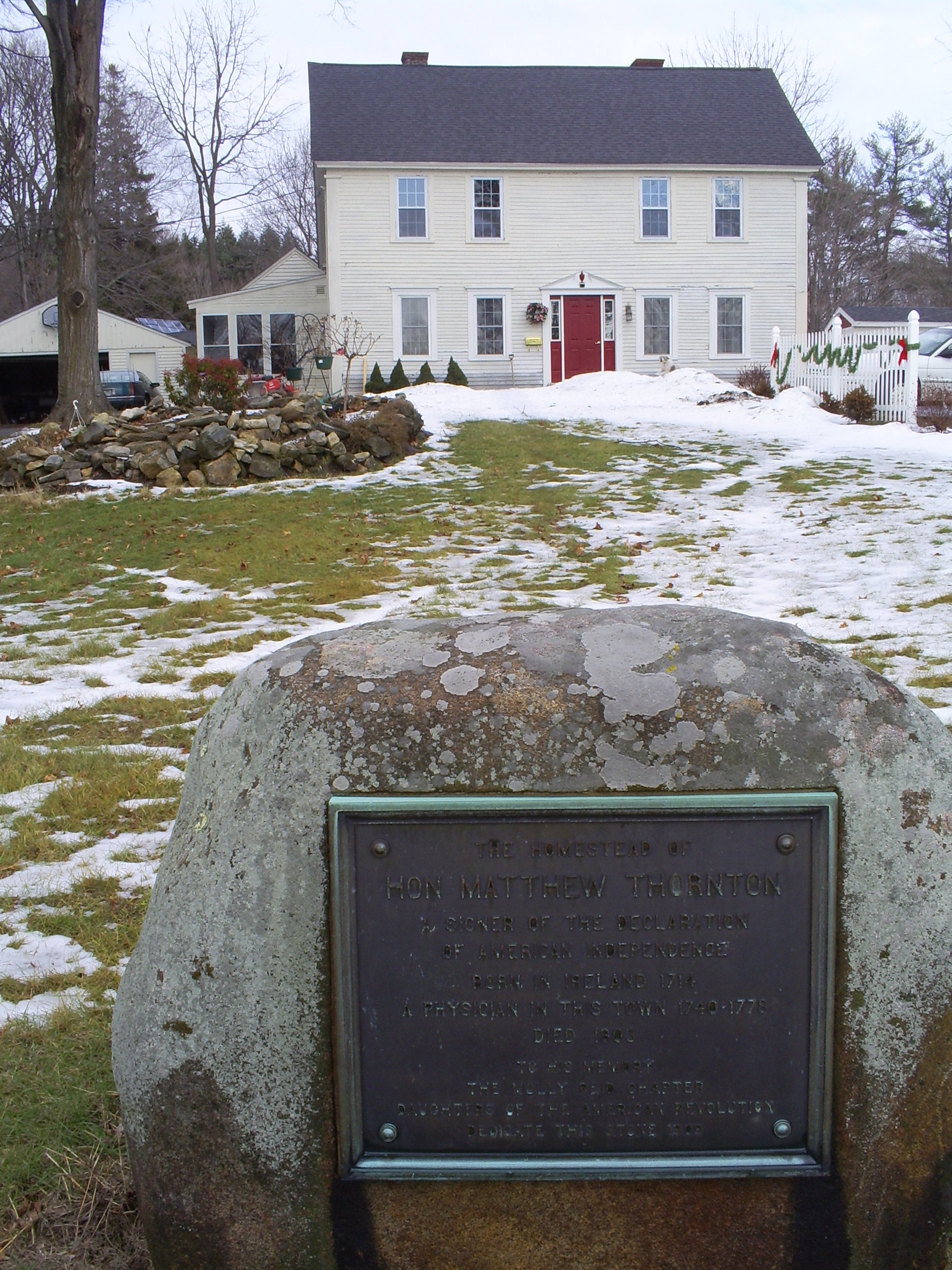
The Matthew Thornton House in Derry, New Hampshire

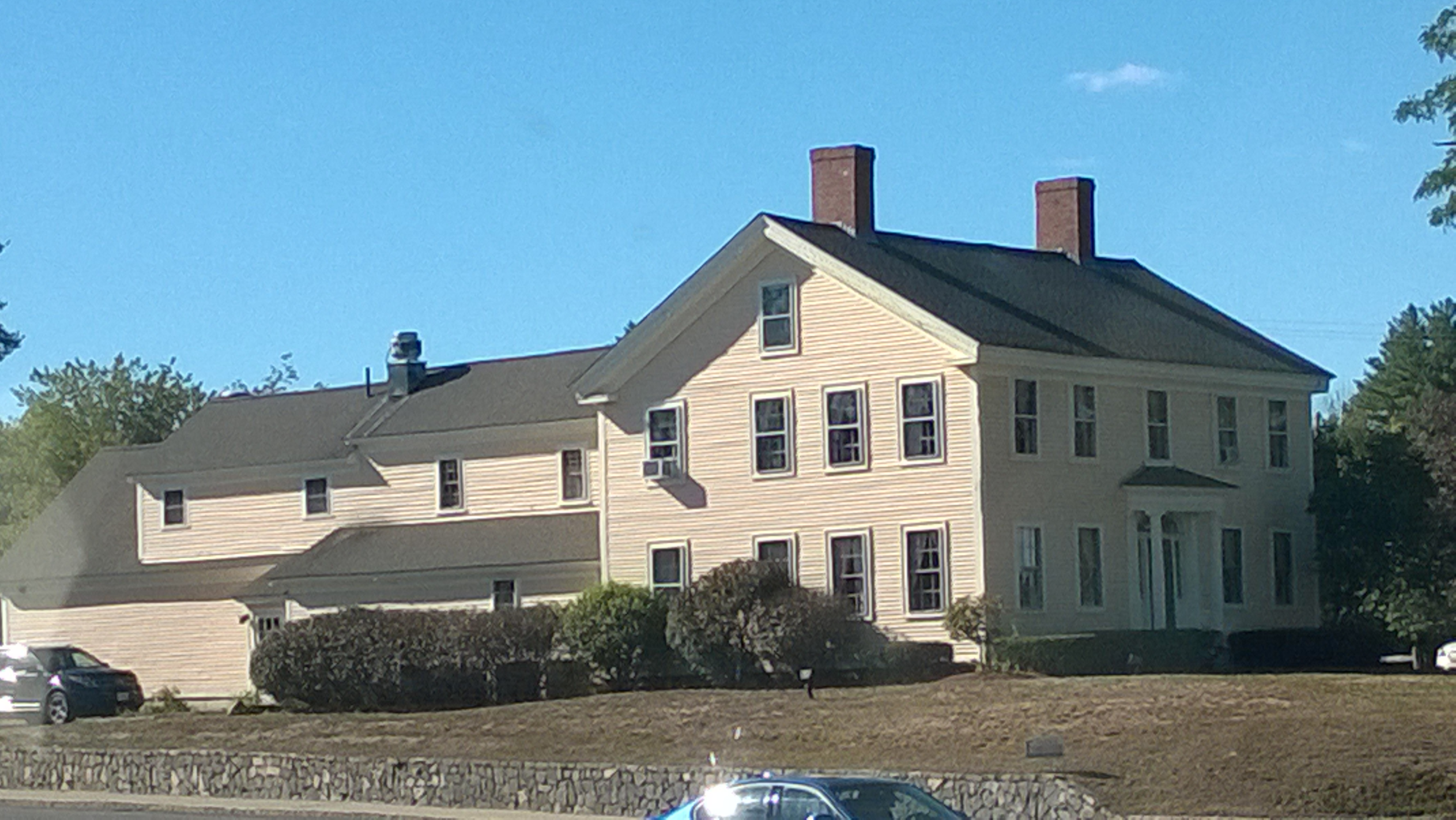
Thornton's inn which he ran with his wife Hannah in Merrimack. It is located across from his gravesite and close to the former Thornton's Ferry landing site, which he also ran with his wife.

Matthew Thornton (March 3, 1714 – June 24, 1803) was an Irish-born Founding Father of the United States who signed the United States Declaration of Independence as a representative of New Hampshire.

== Background and early life ==
Thornton was born in Clare County in Ireland in 1714 to James and Elizabeth (née Jenkins) Thornton. He came to the United States with his brother Samuel who was born in 1712. They settled in Londonderry, New Hampshire. James Thornton lived on a farm within a mile of Derry, and this is where Matthew was probably born, although Lisburn and Limerick have also been suggested as birthplaces.

In 1716, Thornton's family immigrated to North America when he was three years old, settling first in Wiscasset, Maine. On July 11, 1722, the community was attacked by Native Americans. James and Elizabeth Thornton fled from their burning home with Matthew, moving shortly thereafter to Worcester, Massachusetts. Thornton completed studies in medicine at Leicester. He became a physician and established a medical practice in Londonderry, New Hampshire. He was appointed as a surgeon for the New Hampshire Militia troops in an expedition against Fortress Louisbourg in 1745. He served in the New Hampshire Provincial Assembly from 1758-1762, had royal commissions as justice of the peace, and served as colonel in the militia from 1775 until his resignation in 1779.

In 1760, Thornton married Hannah Jack, and the couple had five children. Thornton became a Londonderry selectman, a representative to and president of the Provincial Assembly, and a member of the Committee of Safety, drafting New Hampshire's plan of government after dissolution of the royal government, which was the first state constitution adopted after the start of hostilities with England.

== Continental Congress ==
Thornton served as the president of the New Hampshire Provincial Congress in 1775, and from January to September 1776, as speaker of the New Hampshire House of Representatives. He was elected to the Continental Congress after the debates on independence had occurred, but as he did not arrive in Philadelphia until November 1776, he was granted permission to actually sign the Declaration of Independence four months after the formal signing in July.

== Later life ==
He became a political essayist. He retired from his medical practice, and in 1780, moved to Merrimack, New Hampshire, where he farmed and operated Thornton's ferry with his family. Although he did not attend law school, he served as a judge on the New Hampshire Superior Court from 1776 to 1782.

In 1783, Thornton represented the towns of Merrimack and Bedford in the New Hampshire House of Representatives, and then Hillsborough County in the New Hampshire Senate from 1784 to 1787, while simultaneously serving as a state counselor from 1785 to 1786 and as a state representative again for Merrimack in 1786. His wife Hannah died in 1786.

== Death and legacy ==
Thornton died in Newburyport, Massachusetts, while visiting his daughter. He was 89 years old.

The town of Thornton, New Hampshire, is named in his honor, as is a Londonderry elementary school, and Thorntons Ferry School in Merrimack. Thornton's residence in Derry, which was part of Londonderry at the time, is listed on the National Register of Historic Places. He is featured on a New Hampshire historical marker (number 79) along U.S. Route 3 in Merrimack.

Thornton was the uncle of Capt. Matthew Thornton, a suspected Loyalist who was charged with treason related to actions just before the Battle of Bennington in 1777. Ebenezer Webster, father of Daniel Webster, was enlisted to investigate the allegation. At his trial Capt. Thornton pleaded not guilty. Evidence was presented both for and against and the jury found him not guilty, whereupon he was discharged.

== See also ==
- Memorial to the 56 Signers of the Declaration of Independence
