= List of school districts in New Hampshire =

This is a list of school districts in New Hampshire.

The majority of school districts in the state are independent governments. Nine are dependent to city governments and the Coos County School District is controlled the Coos County government.

Town or city	School district	School Administrative Unit (SAU)
Acworth	Fall Mountain Regional	60 – Fall Mountain Regional (Pre-K to 12)
Albany	Albany	9 – Conway (Pre-K to 12)
Alexandria	Newfound Area	4 – Newfound Area (Pre-K to 12)
Allenstown	Allenstown	53 – Pembroke (K to 8)
Alstead	Fall Mountain Regional	60 – Fall Mountain Regional (Pre-K to 12)
Alton	Alton	72 – Alton (K to 8)
Amherst	Amherst	39 – Amherst (K to 8)
Amherst	Souhegan Cooperative	39 – Amherst (9 to 12)
Andover	Andover	46 – SAU #46 (K to 8)
Antrim	Contoocook Valley	1 – Contoocook Valley (Pre-K to 12)
Ashland	Ashland	2 – Inter-Lakes Cooperative (K to 8)
Ashland	Pemi-Baker Regional	48 – Plymouth (9 to 12)
Atkinson	Timberlane Regional	106 – Timberlane Regional (Pre-K to 12)
Auburn	Auburn	15 – Hooksett (Pre-K to 8)
Barnstead	Barnstead	86 – Barnstead (Pre-K to 8)
Barrington	Barrington	74 – Barrington (Pre-K to 8)
Bartlett	Bartlett	9 – Conway (Pre-K to 8)
Bath	Bath	23 – Haverhill Cooperative (K to 6)
Bedford	Bedford	25 – Bedford (Pre-K to 12)
Belmont	Shaker Regional	80 – Shaker Regional (Pre-K to 12)
Bennington	Contoocook Valley	1 – Contoocook Valley (Pre-K to 12)
Benton	Benton	23 – Haverhill Cooperative (Pre-K to 12)
Berlin	Berlin	3 – Berlin (Pre-K to 12)
Bethlehem	Bethlehem	35 – SAU #35 (Pre-K to 6)
Bethlehem	Profile	35 – SAU #35 (7 to 12)
Boscawen	Merrimack Valley	46 – SAU #46 (Pre-K to 12)
Bow	Bow	67 – Bow (Pre-K to 12)
Bradford	Kearsarge Regional	65 – Kearsarge Regional (Pre-K to 12)
Brentwood	Brentwood	16 – Exeter (Pre-K to 5)
Brentwood	Exeter Region Cooperative	16 – Exeter (6 to 12)
Bridgewater	Pasquaney	108 – Pasquaney (Pre-K to 6)
Bristol	Newfound Area	4 – Newfound Area (Pre-K to 12)
Brookfield	Governor Wentworth Regional	49 – Governor Wentworth Regional (Pre-K to 12)
Brookline	Brookline	41 – Hollis-Brookline (Pre-K to 6)
Brookline	Hollis-Brookline Cooperative	41 – Hollis-Brookline (7 to 12)
Campton	Campton	48 – Plymouth (Pre-K to 8)
Campton	Pemi-Baker Regional	48 – Plymouth (9 to 12)
Canaan	Mascoma Valley Regional	62 – Mascoma Valley (Pre-K to 12)
Candia	Candia	15 – Hooksett (K to 8)
Canterbury	Shaker Regional	80 – Shaker Regional (Pre-K to 12)
Carroll	White Mountains Regional	36 – White Mountains Regional (Pre-K to 12)
Center Harbor	Inter-Lakes Cooperative	2 – Inter-Lakes Cooperative (Pre-K to 12)
Charlestown	Fall Mountain Regional	60 – Fall Mountain Regional (Pre-K to 12)
Chatham	Chatham	9 – Conway (Pre-K to 12)
Chester	Chester	82 – Chester (Pre-K to 8)
Chesterfield	Chesterfield	29 – Keene (K to 8)
Chichester	Chichester	53 – Pembroke (K to 8)
Claremont	Claremont	6 – Claremont (Pre-K to 12)
Clarksville	Clarksville	7 – Colebrook (Pre-K to 12)
Colebrook	Colebrook	7 – Colebrook (Pre-K to 12)
Columbia	Columbia	7 – Colebrook (Pre-K to 12)
Concord	Concord	8 – Concord (Pre-K to 12)
Concord	In-State Facility	501 – State Operated Facilities
Conway	Conway	9 – Conway (K to 12)
Cornish	Cornish	100 – Cornish (Pre-K to 8)
Croydon	Croydon	99 – Croydon (K to 4)
Dalton	White Mountains Regional	36 – White Mountains Regional (Pre-K to 12)
Danbury	Newfound Area	4 – Newfound Area (Pre-K to 12)
Danville	Timberlane Regional	106 – Timberlane Regional (Pre-K to 12)
Deerfield	Deerfield	53 – Pembroke (Pre-K to 8)
Deering	Hillsboro-Deering Cooperative	34 – Hillsboro-Deering (Pre-K to 12)
Derry	Derry Cooperative	10 – Derry Cooperative (Pre-K to 8)
Dorchester	Mascoma Valley Regional	62 – Mascoma Valley (Pre-K to 12)
Dover	Dover	11 – Dover (Pre-K to 12)
Dublin	Contoocook Valley	1 – Contoocook Valley (Pre-K to 12)
Dummer	Dummer	20 – Gorham (Pre-K to 12)
Dunbarton	Dunbarton	67 – Bow (K to 6)
Durham	Oyster River Cooperative	5 – Oyster River (Pre-K to 12)
East Kingston	East Kingston	16 – Exeter (K to 5)
East Kingston	Exeter Region Cooperative	16 – Exeter (6 to 12)
Easton	Lafayette Regional	35 – SAU #35 (K to 6)
Easton	Profile	35 – SAU #35 (7 to 12)
Eaton	Eaton	9 – Conway (Pre-K to 12)
Effingham	Governor Wentworth Regional	49 – Governor Wentworth Regional (Pre-K to 12)
Ellsworth	Ellsworth	48 – Plymouth (Pre-K to 12)
Enfield	Mascoma Valley Regional	62 – Mascoma Valley (Pre-K to 12)
Epping	Epping	14 – Epping (Pre-K to 12)
Epsom	Epsom	53 – Pembroke (K to 8)
Errol	Errol	20 – Gorham (K to 8)
Exeter	Exeter	16 – Exeter (Pre-K to 5)
Exeter	Exeter Region Cooperative	16 – Exeter (6 to 12)
Farmington	Farmington	61 – Farmington (K to 12)
Fitzwilliam	Monadnock Regional	93 – Monadnock Regional (Pre-K to 12)
Francestown	Contoocook Valley	1 – Contoocook Valley (Pre-K to 12)
Franconia	Lafayette Regional	35 – SAU #35 (K to 6)
Franconia	Profile	35 – SAU #35 (7 to 12)
Franklin	Franklin	18 – Franklin (Pre-K to 12)
Freedom	Freedom	13 – Tamworth (Pre-K to 6)
Fremont	Fremont	83 – Fremont (Pre-K to 8)
Gilford	Gilford	73 – Gilford (K to 12)
Gilmanton	Gilmanton	79 – Gilmanton (K to 8)
Gilsum	Monadnock Regional	93 – Monadnock Regional (Pre-K to 12)
Goffstown	Goffstown	19 – Goffstown (Pre-K to 12)
Gorham	Gorham Randolph Shelburne Cooperative	20 – Gorham (K to 12)
Goshen	Goshen	102 – Goshen (Pre-K to 12)
Grafton	Mascoma Valley Regional	62 – Mascoma Valley (Pre-K to 12)
Grantham	Grantham	75 – Grantham (Pre-K to 6)
Greenfield	Contoocook Valley	1 – Contoocook Valley (Pre-K to 12)
Greenland	Greenland	50 – Greenland (K to 8)
Greenville	Mascenic Regional	87 – Mascenic Regional (Pre-K to 12)
Groton	Pasquaney	108 – Pasquaney (Pre-K to 6)
Hale's Location	Hale's Location (Carroll County)	97 – Hale's Location (Carroll County) (Pre-K to 12)
Hampstead	Hampstead	55 – Hampstead (Pre-K to 8)
Hampton	Hampton	90 – Hampton (Pre-K to 8)
Hampton	Winnacunnet Cooperative	21 – Winnacunnet (9 to 12)
Hampton Falls	Hampton Falls	21 – Winnacunnet (Pre-K to 8)
Hampton Falls	Winnacunnet Cooperative	21 – Winnacunnet (9 to 12)
Hancock	Contoocook Valley	1 – Contoocook Valley (Pre-K to 12)
Hanover	Dresden	70 – Hanover (6 to 12)
Hanover	Hanover	70 – Hanover (K to 5)
Harrisville	Harrisville	29 – Keene (K to 6)
Hart's Location	Hart's Location	9 – Conway (Pre-K to 12)
Haverhill	Haverhill Cooperative	23 – Haverhill Cooperative (Pre-K to 12)
Hebron	Pasquaney	108 – Pasquaney (Pre-K to 6)
Henniker	Henniker	24 – Henniker (Pre-K to 8)
Henniker	John Stark Regional	24 – Henniker (9 to 12)
Hill	Hill	103 – Hill (Pre-K to 6)
Hillsborough	Hillsboro-Deering Cooperative	34 – Hillsboro-Deering (Pre-K to 12)
Hinsdale	Hinsdale	92 – Hinsdale (Pre-K to 12)
Holderness	Holderness	48 – Plymouth (K to 8)
Holderness	Pemi-Baker Regional	48 – Plymouth (9 to 12)
Hollis	Hollis	41 – Hollis-Brookline (Pre-K to 6)
Hollis	Hollis-Brookline Cooperative	41 – Hollis-Brookline (7 to 12)
Hooksett	Hooksett	15 – Hooksett (Pre-K to 8)
Hopkinton	Hopkinton	66 – Hopkinton (Pre-K to 12)
Hudson	Hudson	81 – Hudson (Pre-K to 12)
Jackson	Jackson	9 – Conway (K to 6)
Jaffrey	Jaffrey-Rindge Cooperative	47 – Jaffrey-Rindge (K to 12)
Jefferson	White Mountains Regional	36 – White Mountains Regional (Pre-K to 12)
Keene	Keene	29 – Keene (Pre-K to 12)
Kensington	Exeter Region Cooperative	16 – Exeter (6 to 12)
Kensington	Kensington	16 – Exeter (Pre-K to 5)
Kingston	Sanborn Regional	17 – Sanborn Regional (Pre-K to 12)
Laconia	Laconia	30 – Laconia (Pre-K to 12)
Lancaster	White Mountains Regional	36 – White Mountains Regional (Pre-K to 12)
Landaff	Landaff	35 – SAU #35 (Pre-K to 4)
Langdon	Fall Mountain Regional	60 – Fall Mountain Regional (Pre-K to 12)
Lebanon	Lebanon	88 – Lebanon (Pre-K to 12)
Lee	Oyster River Cooperative	5 – Oyster River (Pre-K to 12)
Lempster	Lempster	71 – Lempster (Pre-K to 8)
Lincoln	Lincoln-Woodstock Cooperative	68 – Lincoln-Woodstock (Pre-K to 12)
Lisbon	Lisbon Regional	110 – Lisbon Regional (Pre-K to 12)
Litchfield	Litchfield	27 – Litchfield (Pre-K to 12)
Littleton	Littleton	84 – Littleton (K to 12)
Londonderry	Londonderry	12 – Londonderry (Pre-K to 12)
Loudon	Merrimack Valley	46 – SAU #46 (Pre-K to 12)
Lyman	Lisbon Regional	110 – Lisbon Regional (Pre-K to 12)
Lyme	Lyme	76 – Lyme (K to 8)
Lyndeborough	Wilton-Lyndeborough Cooperative	63 – Wilton (Pre-K to 12)
Madbury	Oyster River Cooperative	5 – Oyster River (Pre-K to 12)
Madison	Madison	13 – Tamworth (Pre-K to 6)
Manchester	Manchester	37 – Manchester (Pre-K to 12)
Marlborough	Marlborough	29 – Keene (Pre-K to 8)
Marlow	Marlow	29 – Keene (K to 5)
Mason	Mason	89 – Mason (Pre-K to 5)
Meredith	Inter-Lakes Cooperative	2 – Inter-Lakes Cooperative (Pre-K to 12)
Merrimack	Merrimack	26 – Merrimack (Pre-K to 12)
Middleton	Middleton	69 – Middleton SAU (Pre-K to 6)
Milan	Milan	20 – Gorham (Pre-K to 6)
Milford	Milford	40 – Milford (Pre-K to 12)
Millsfield	Coos County School District	98 – Coos County (Pre-K to 12)
Milton	Milton	64 – Milton (Pre-K to 12)
Monroe	Monroe	77 – Monroe (Pre-K to 8)
Mont Vernon	Mont Vernon	39 – Amherst (K to 6)
Mont Vernon	Souhegan Cooperative	39 – Amherst (9 to 12)
Moultonborough	Moultonborough	45 – Moultonborough (Pre-K to 12)
Nashua	Nashua	42 – Nashua (Pre-K to 12)
Nelson	Nelson	29 – Keene (K to 5)
New Boston	New Boston	19 – Goffstown (Pre-K to 6)
New Castle	New Castle	50 – Greenland (K to 6)
New Durham	Governor Wentworth Regional	49 – Governor Wentworth Regional (Pre-K to 12)
New Hampton	Newfound Area	4 – Newfound Area (Pre-K to 12)
New Ipswich	Mascenic Regional	87 – Mascenic Regional (Pre-K to 12)
New London	Kearsarge Regional	65 – Kearsarge Regional (Pre-K to 12)
Newbury	Kearsarge Regional	65 – Kearsarge Regional (Pre-K to 12)
Newfields	Exeter Region Cooperative	16 – Exeter (6 to 12)
Newfields	Newfields	16 – Exeter (K to 5)
Newington	Newington	50 – Greenland (K to 6)
Newmarket	Newmarket	31 – Newmarket (Pre-K to 12)
Newport	Newport	43 – Newport (K to 12)
Newton	Sanborn Regional	17 – Sanborn Regional (Pre-K to 12)
North Hampton	North Hampton	21 – Winnacunnet (Pre-K to 8)
North Hampton	Winnacunnet Cooperative	21 – Winnacunnet (9 to 12)
Northfield	Winnisquam Regional	59 – Winnisquam Regional (Pre-K to 12)
Northumberland	Northumberland	58 – Northumberland (K to 12)
Northwood	Northwood	44 – Northwood (Pre-K to 8)
Nottingham	Nottingham	107 – Nottingham (Pre-K to 8)
Orange	Mascoma Valley Regional	62 – Mascoma Valley (Pre-K to 12)
Orford	Rivendell	78 – Rivendell Interstate (6 to 12)
Ossipee	Governor Wentworth Regional	49 – Governor Wentworth Regional (Pre-K to 12)
Pelham	Pelham	28 – Pelham (K to 12)
Pembroke	Pembroke	53 – Pembroke (K to 12)
Penacook	Merrimack Valley	46 – SAU #46 (Pre-K to 12)
Peterborough	Contoocook Valley	1 – Contoocook Valley (Pre-K to 12)
Piermont	Piermont	23 – Haverhill Cooperative (Pre-K to 8)
Pittsburg	Pittsburg	7 – Colebrook (Pre-K to 12)
Pittsfield	Pittsfield	51 – Pittsfield (K to 12)
Plainfield	Plainfield	32 – Plainfield (K to 8)
Plaistow	Timberlane Regional	106 – Timberlane Regional (Pre-K to 12)
Plymouth	Pemi-Baker Regional	48 – Plymouth (9 to 12)
Plymouth	Plymouth	48 – Plymouth (Pre-K to 8)
Portsmouth	Portsmouth	52 – Portsmouth (K to 12)
Randolph	Gorham Randolph Shelburne Cooperative	20 – Gorham (K to 12)
Raymond	Raymond	33 – Raymond (K to 12)
Richmond	Monadnock Regional	93 – Monadnock Regional (Pre-K to 12)
Rindge	Jaffrey-Rindge Cooperative	47 – Jaffrey-Rindge (K to 12)
Rochester	Rochester	54 – Rochester (Pre-K to 12)
Rollinsford	Rollinsford	104 – Rollinsford (K to 6)
Roxbury	Monadnock Regional	93 – Monadnock Regional (Pre-K to 12)
Rumney	Pemi-Baker Regional	48 – Plymouth (9 to 12)
Rumney	Rumney	48 – Plymouth (K to 8)
Rye	Rye	50 – Greenland (K to 8)
Salem	Salem	57 – Salem (Pre-K to 12)
Salisbury	Merrimack Valley	46 – SAU #46 (Pre-K to 12)
Sanbornton	Winnisquam Regional	59 – Winnisquam Regional (Pre-K to 12)
Sandown	Timberlane Regional	106 – Timberlane Regional (Pre-K to 12)
Sandwich	Inter-Lakes Cooperative	2 – Inter-Lakes Cooperative (Pre-K to 12)
Seabrook	Seabrook	21 – Winnacunnet (Pre-K to 8)
Seabrook	Winnacunnet Cooperative	21 – Winnacunnet (9 to 12)
Sharon	Contoocook Valley	1 – Contoocook Valley (Pre-K to 12)
Shelburne	Gorham Randolph Shelburne Cooperative	20 – Gorham (K to 12)
Somersworth	Somersworth	56 – Somersworth (Pre-K to 12)
South Hampton	South Hampton	21 – Winnacunnet (K to 8)
Springfield	Kearsarge Regional	65 – Kearsarge Regional (Pre-K to 12)
Stark	Stark	58 – Northumberland (K to 6)
Stewartstown	Stewartstown	7 – Colebrook (Pre-K to 8)
Stoddard	Stoddard	24 – Henniker (K to 5)
Strafford	Strafford	105 – Strafford (K to 8)
Stratford	Stratford	58 – Northumberland (Pre-K to 8)
Stratham	Exeter Region Cooperative	16 – Exeter (6 to 12)
Stratham	Stratham	16 – Exeter (Pre-K to 5)
Sugar Hill	Lafayette Regional	35 – SAU #35 (K to 6)
Sugar Hill	Profile	35 – SAU #35 (7 to 12)
Sullivan	Sullivan	96 – Sullivan (Pre-K to 12)
Sunapee	Sunapee	85 – Sunapee (K to 12)
Surry	Surry	91 – Surry (Pre-K to 12)
Sutton	Kearsarge Regional	65 – Kearsarge Regional (Pre-K to 12)
Swanzey	Monadnock Regional	93 – Monadnock Regional (Pre-K to 12)
Tamworth	Tamworth	13 – Tamworth (K to 8)
Temple	Contoocook Valley	1 – Contoocook Valley (Pre-K to 12)
Thornton	Pemi-Baker Regional	48 – Plymouth (9 to 12)
Thornton	Thornton	48 – Plymouth (K to 8)
Tilton	Winnisquam Regional	59 – Winnisquam Regional (Pre-K to 12)
Troy	Monadnock Regional	93 – Monadnock Regional (Pre-K to 12)
Tuftonboro	Governor Wentworth Regional	49 – Governor Wentworth Regional (Pre-K to 12)
Unity	Unity	109 – Unity (Pre-K to 8)
Wakefield	Wakefield	101 – Wakefield (K to 8)
Walpole	Fall Mountain Regional	60 – Fall Mountain Regional (Pre-K to 12)
Warner	Kearsarge Regional	65 – Kearsarge Regional (Pre-K to 12)
Warren	Warren	23 – Haverhill Cooperative (Pre-K to 8)
Washington	Washington	34 – Hillsboro-Deering (K to 5)
Waterville Valley	Waterville Valley	48 – Plymouth (K to 8)
Weare	John Stark Regional	24 – Henniker (9 to 12)
Weare	Weare	24 – Henniker (K to 8)
Webster	Merrimack Valley	46 – SAU #46 (Pre-K to 12)
Wentworth	Pemi-Baker Regional	48 – Plymouth (9 to 12)
Wentworth	Wentworth	48 – Plymouth (K to 8)
Westmoreland	Westmoreland	29 – Keene (K to 8)
Whitefield	White Mountains Regional	36 – White Mountains Regional (Pre-K to 12)
Wilmot	Kearsarge Regional	65 – Kearsarge Regional (Pre-K to 12)
Wilton	Wilton-Lyndeborough Cooperative	63 – Wilton (Pre-K to 12)
Winchester	Winchester	94 – Winchester (K to 8)
Windham	Windham	95 – Windham (Pre-K to 12)
Windsor	Windsor	34 – Hillsboro-Deering (Pre-K to 12)
Wolfeboro	Governor Wentworth Regional	49 – Governor Wentworth Regional (Pre-K to 12)
Woodstock	Lincoln-Woodstock Cooperative	68 – Lincoln-Woodstock (K to 12)

== Special school districts ==
School	Type of school	School Administrative Unit (SAU)
Coe-Brown Northwood Academy	Public academy	201 – Coe-Brown Northwood Academy (9 to 12)
Pinkerton Academy	Public academy	202 – Pinkerton Academy (9 to 12)
Prospect Mountain High School	Joint Maintenance Agreement (JMA)	301 – Prospect Mountain JMA (9 to 12)
