= Mr. New Hampshire Basketball =

New Hampshire basketball award

Each year the Mr. New Hampshire Basketball award is given to the person chosen as the best high school boys basketball player in the U.S. state of New Hampshire. The award winner is selected by members of the New Hampshire Basketball Coaches Association via a vote that considers three distinct aspects for each candidate: academic excellence (25 percent), sportsmanship (25 percent), and basketball accomplishments (50 percent).

A second award, the WGAM Radio NH Mr. Basketball Award, is also awarded annually. The award is open to all NH high school basketball players, regardless of grade level or division their school played in. It is voted on by about 15 members of the NH high school sports media.

== NHBCA award winners ==
Year	Player	High School	College	NBA draft
2026	Derek Swartz	Portsmouth High School, Portsmouth	Offers- Boston College, Georgetown, Oklahoma State and Rutgers	
2025	Josh Caruso	Nashua High School South, Nashua	Saint Anslem	
2024	Jackson Marshall	Pinkerton Academy, Derry	University of Connecticut (baseball)	
2023	Grady Walsh	Keene High School, Keene	Duke University Durham, North Carolina	
2022	Brendan Elrick	Hopkinton High School, Hopkinton	Clarkson University	
2021	Dylan Khalil	Sanborn Regional High School, Kingston	University of New Hampshire (Cross Country, Track & Field)	
2020	Jordan Geronimo	St. Paul's School, Concord	Indiana University	
2019	Arie Breakfield	Spaulding High School, Rochester	Southern New Hampshire University	
2018	Cody Morissette	Exeter High School, Exeter	Boston College (baseball)	
2017	Cal Connelly	Spaulding High School, Rochester	Assumption	
2016	Keith Brown	Pelham High School, Pelham	Endicott College	
2015	Cody Ball	Londonderry High School, Londonderry	Saint Anselm College	
2014	Eric Gendron (2)	Merrimack High School, Merrimack	Trinity College	
2013	Eric Gendron	Merrimack High School, Merrimack	Trinity College	
2012	Tyler Gendron	Merrimack High School, Merrimack	Rensselaer Polytechnic Institute	
2011	Connor Green	Bishop Guertin High School, Nashua		
2010	Alex Burt	Dover High School, Dover		
2009	Josh Jones	Salem High School, Salem	Franklin Pierce University	
2008	Casey Maue	Hanover High School, Hanover	Stanford University	
2007	Stephen Savage	Salem High School, Salem		
2006	Tyler Roche	Manchester Central High School, Manchester	Boston College	
2005	Zach Etten	Hollis/Brookline High School, Hollis	Babson College	
2004	Nick Pelletier	Souhegan High School, Nashua	Wesleyan University	
2003	Aaron Stewart	Laconia High School, Laconia	Columbia University	
2002	Chris Burns	Merrimack High School, Merrimack	Providence	
2001	Mike Konavelchik	Alvirne High School		
2000	Ryan Stys	Manchester Central High School		
1999	Matt Bonner	Concord High School, Concord	University of Florida	2003 / Round: 2 / Pick: 45th overall
1998	Billy Collins	Bishop Brady High School, Concord	Rutgers University	
1997	Chris Coates	Winnacunnet High School, Hampton	Keene State	
1996			University of Florida	
1995	Michael Jean	Pinkerton Academy, Derry, NH	Saint Anselm College	
1994				
1993	Jason Richardson	Manchester High School West	Saint Anselm College	
1992	Jim Naughton	Winnacunnet High School, Hampton		
1991				
1990	Gregg Dixon	Profile High School, Bethlehem		
1989	Tom Brayshaw	Kearsarge Regional High School, Sutton	Cornell University	

== WGAM Radio award winners ==
Year	Player	High School	College	NBA draft
2010	Zach Mathieu	Pinkerton Academy, Derry	Franklin Pierce (baseball)	
	Jordan Laguerre			
	Tyler Roche			
	Corey Hassan	Merrimack High School, Merrimack	Boston University, Sacred Heart	
	Mike Stys			
