= Pelham High School =

Pelham High School may refer to:

- Pelham High School (Alabama), a school in Pelham, Alabama, United States
- Pelham High School (Georgia), a school in Pelham, Georgia, United States
- Pelham High School (New Hampshire), a school in Pelham, New Hampshire, United States

== See also ==
- Pelham Memorial High School, a school in Pelham, New York, United States
