= Pelham Schools =

Pelham Schools may refer to:

- Pelham School District in New Hampshire
- Pelham Public Schools in New York
- Pelham City Schools in Alabama
