= Matt Bonner =

American basketball player (born 1980)

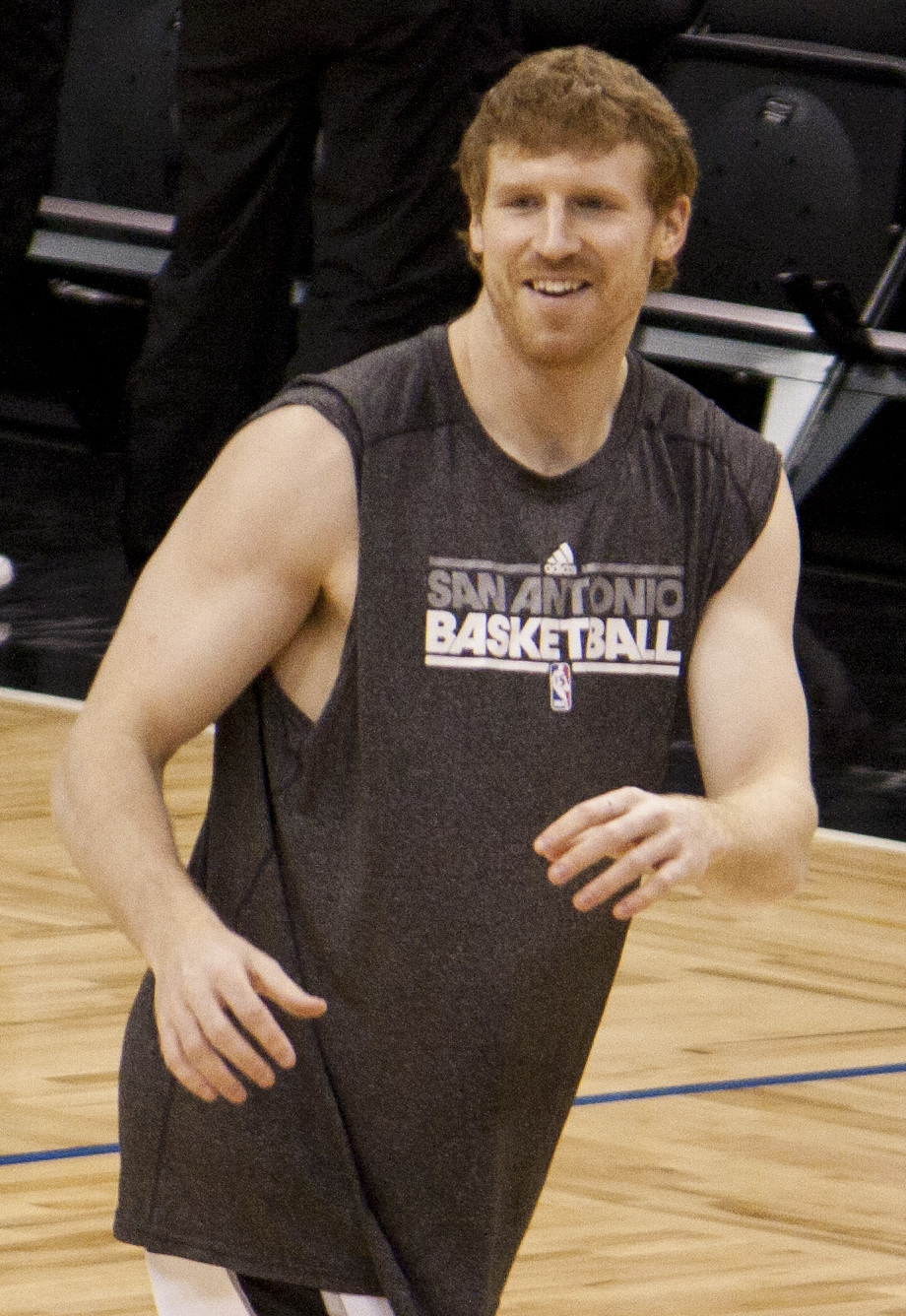
- Bonner with the San Antonio Spurs in 2010

Personal information
- Born: April 5, 1980 (age 46) Concord, New Hampshire, U.S.
- Listed height: 6 ft 10 in (2.08 m)
- Listed weight: 235 lb (107 kg)

Career information
- High school: Concord (Concord, New Hampshire)
- College: Florida (1999–2003)
- NBA draft: 2003: 2nd round, 45th overall pick
- Drafted by: Chicago Bulls
- Playing career: 2003–2016
- Position: Power forward / center
- Number: 16, 15

Career history
- 2003–2004: Pallacanestro Messina
- 2004–2006: Toronto Raptors
- 2006–2016: San Antonio Spurs

Career highlights
- 2× NBA champion (2007, 2014); 2× AP honorable mention All-American (2002, 2003); 2× Academic All-American (2002, 2003); First-team All-SEC (2003); Second-team All-SEC (2002); Third-team All-SEC (2001); Fourth-team Parade All-American (1999); Mr. New Hampshire Basketball (1999)

Career statistics
- Points: 4,632 (5.8 ppg)
- Rebounds: 1,749 (3.0 rpg)
- Assists: 552 (0.7 apg)
- Stats at NBA.com
- Stats at Basketball Reference

Matthew Robert Bonner (born April 5, 1980), also known as the Red Rocket or Red Mamba, is an American former professional basketball player. Bonner played college basketball for the University of Florida before being selected by the Chicago Bulls with the 45th overall pick in the 2003 NBA draft. During his career Bonner played for the Toronto Raptors and the San Antonio Spurs with whom he won two NBA championships. He is the only player in NBA history to be born in New Hampshire.

== Early life ==
Born in Concord, New Hampshire, Bonner attended Concord High School, where he helped lead them to three state championships. Bonner was also the Valedictorian of his graduating class.

== College career ==
Bonner accepted an athletic scholarship to attend the University of Florida, where he played for coach Billy Donovan's Florida Gators men's basketball team from 1999 to 2003. In his four seasons, he amassed 1,570 points, 778 rebounds and 165 three-point baskets. As a senior in 2003, he was a first-team All-Southeastern Conference (SEC) selection and an Associated Press honorable mention All-American.

Bonner graduated with a bachelor's degree, with high honors, in business administration and a 3.96 grade point average (GPA). He won Academic All-American of the Year for the sport of basketball in both 2002 and 2003.

== Professional career ==
=== Sicilia Messina (2003–2004) ===
Bonner was selected with the 45th overall pick in the 2003 NBA draft by the Chicago Bulls but was then traded to the Toronto Raptors. The Raptors did not have a roster spot available at the time and asked Bonner to play overseas and hone his skills with a verbal promise to make the team the following season.

Bonner signed with Sicilia Messina of the Italian league in Messina, Sicily. Sicilia filed for bankruptcy in the middle of the season and stopped paying its players. Many players left the team but Bonner continued to play and finished the year averaging 19.2 points and 9.3 rebounds.

=== Toronto Raptors (2004–2006) ===
In September 2004, Bonner signed a one-year deal with the Toronto Raptors. On December 15, 2004, Bonner was ejected during a game against the Minnesota Timberwolves after attempting to block a Kevin Garnett shot attempt, with Raptors fans giving him a standing ovation, chanting his name and high-fiving him on his way out. In 2004–05, he played in all 82 regular season games and averaged 7.2 points. He remains the only Raptors rookie to play all 82 games in a season.

In August 2005, Bonner re-signed with the Raptors on a two-year deal.

=== San Antonio Spurs (2006–2016) ===
On June 21, 2006, Bonner was traded with Eric Williams and a second round draft pick to the San Antonio Spurs for Rasho Nesterović and cash considerations. In his first season with the Spurs, he averaged 4.9 points in just 11.7 minutes per game, both of which were career lows for Bonner at that time. The team went on to win the NBA championship that season.

In July 2007, Bonner re-signed with the Spurs on a three-year deal. On December 11, 2007, in a loss to the Golden State Warriors, Bonner recorded season-highs of 25 points and 17 rebounds.

On December 7, 2009, Bonner scored a career high 28 points and grabbed 8 rebounds in a 104–101 loss to the Utah Jazz.

In July 2010, Bonner again re-signed with the Spurs on a multi-year deal. He went on to lead the NBA in three-point field goal percentage for 2010–11 after he shot 45.7%.

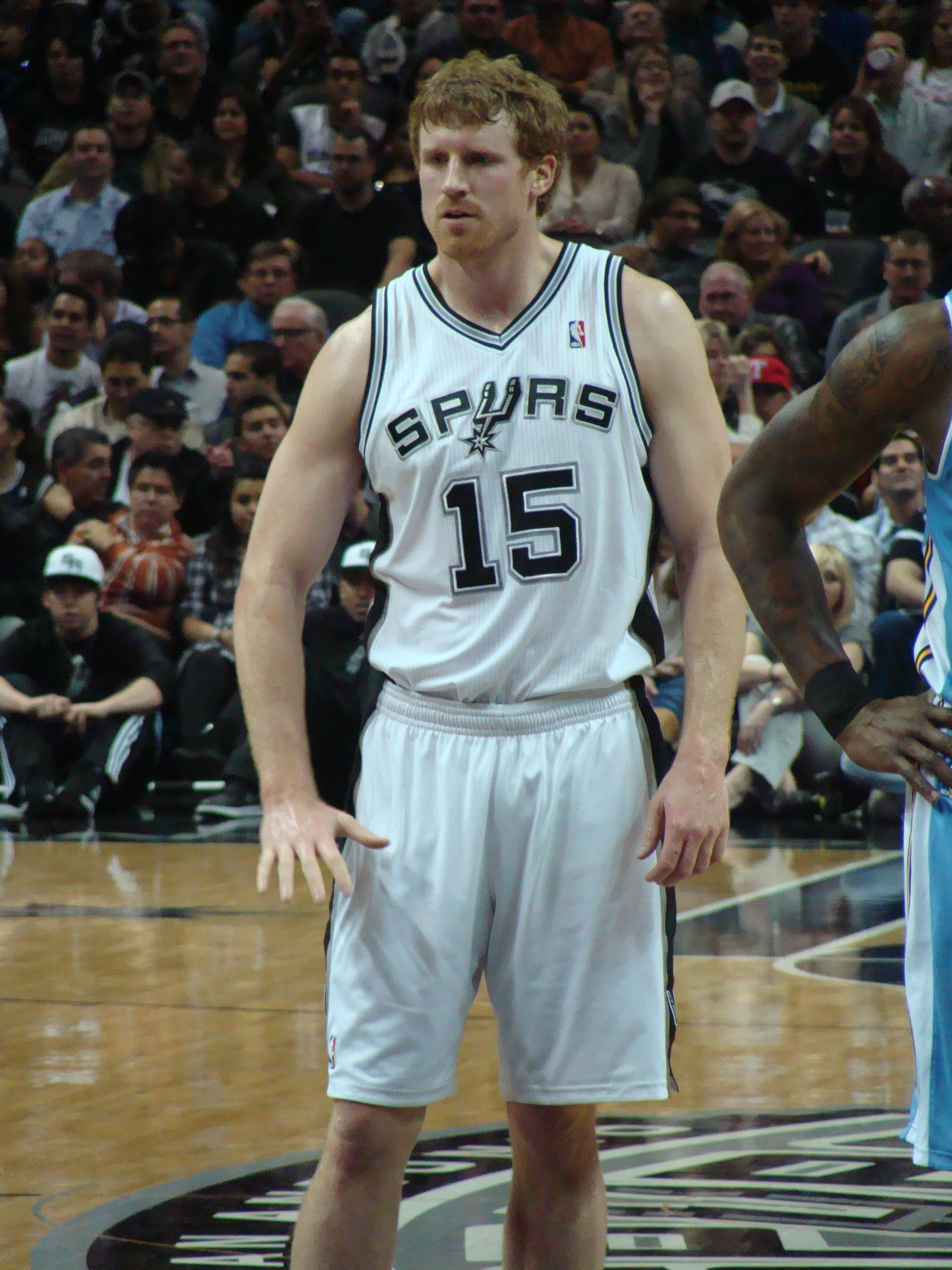
Bonner preparing to take a free throw, 2010

In 2011, Bonner starred in Fundamentals of the Game with Coach B, a comedy web series hosted on the Spurs' official website.

After a social media campaign from his brother Luke, Bonner participated in the 2013 NBA Three-Point Shootout during All-Star Weekend. He recorded a score of 19 in the first round to knock out Ryan Anderson (18) and Stephen Curry (17) and advanced to the final where he lost 20–23 to Kyrie Irving. Later that year, Bonner and the Spurs reached the NBA Finals where they lost to the Miami Heat in seven games.

On June 15, 2014, Bonner won his second NBA championship after the Spurs defeated the Miami Heat 4–1 in the 2014 NBA Finals. On July 21, 2014, Bonner re-signed with the Spurs,

On July 15, 2015, Bonner again re-signed with the Spurs. Bonner's final NBA game was played on April 13, 2016, in a 96–91 win over the Dallas Mavericks where he recorded 6 points,1 rebound, 1 assist and 1 block.

He announced his retirement on January 6, 2017. On January 12, 2017, the Spurs jokingly "retired" Bonner's iconic flannel shirt in a locker room ceremony.

== Career statistics ==
Legend
GP	Games played	GS	Games started	MPG	Minutes per game
FG%	Field goal percentage	3P%	3-point field goal percentage	FT%	Free throw percentage
RPG	Rebounds per game	APG	Assists per game	SPG	Steals per game
BPG	Blocks per game	PPG	Points per game	**Bold**	Career high
†	Won an NBA championship	*	Led the league

=== College ===
Year	Team	GP	GS	MPG	FG%	3P%	FT%	RPG	APG	SPG	BPG	PPG
1999–2000	Florida	**36**	0	13.5	.440	.286	**.867**	3.2	.4	.3	.3	4.8
2000–01	Florida	31	17	28.5	**.514**	.381	.664	**7.7**	**1.5**	.8	.4	13.3
2001–02	Florida	31	31	28.3	.513	.371	.796	7.2	**1.5**	.7	**.7**	**15.6**
2002–03	Florida	33	**33**	**31.4**	.510	**.474**	.733	6.1	**1.5**	**1.1**	.6	15.2
Career		131	81	25.0	.503	.395	.740	5.9	1.2	.7	.5	12.0

=== NBA ===
==== Regular season ====
Year	Team	GP	GS	MPG	FG%	3P%	FT%	RPG	APG	SPG	BPG	PPG
2004–05	Toronto	**82**	0	18.9	**.533**	.424	.789	3.5	.6	.5	.2	7.2
2005–06	Toronto	78	6	21.9	.448	.420	.829	3.6	.7	**.6**	**.4**	7.5
2006–07†	San Antonio	56	0	11.7	.447	.383	.711	2.8	.4	.3	.2	4.9
2007–08	San Antonio	68	3	12.5	.416	.336	**.864**	2.8	.5	.2	.3	4.8
2008–09	San Antonio	81	**67**	**23.8**	.496	.440	.739	**4.8**	**1.0**	**.6**	.3	**8.2**
2009–10	San Antonio	65	8	17.9	.446	.390	.729	3.3	**1.0**	.5	**.4**	7.0
2010–11	San Antonio	66	1	21.7	.464	**.457***	.744	3.6	.9	.4	.3	7.3
2011–12	San Antonio	65	2	20.4	.440	.420	.762	3.3	.9	.2	.3	6.6
2012–13	San Antonio	68	4	13.4	.487	.442	.733	1.9	.5	.3	.3	4.2
2013–14†	San Antonio	61	0	11.3	.445	.429	.750	2.1	.5	.2	.2	3.2
2014–15	San Antonio	72	19	13.0	.409	.365	.811	1.6	.7	.1	.2	3.7
2015–16	San Antonio	30	2	6.9	.509	.441	.750	.9	.3	.2	.0	2.5
Career		792	112	16.9	.464	.414	.780	3.0	.7	.4	.3	5.8

==== Playoffs ====
Year	Team	GP	GS	MPG	FG%	3P%	FT%	RPG	APG	SPG	BPG	PPG
2007†	San Antonio	9	0	2.8	.286	.250	**1.000**	.3	.0	.2	.0	.8
2008	San Antonio	2	0	4.5	**.667**	.000	.000	1.0	**1.0**	.0	.0	2.0
2009	San Antonio	5	**5**	20.0	.217	.231	**1.000**	**3.2**	.0	**.6**	**.4**	3.0
2010	San Antonio	10	0	17.3	.432	.370	**1.000**	**3.2**	.4	.1	.3	5.0
2011	San Antonio	6	0	**20.5**	.480	.333	.800	**3.2**	.3	.2	.2	**6.3**
2012	San Antonio	13	0	12.7	.313	.348	.600	1.9	.7	.2	.3	2.4
2013	San Antonio	20	1	13.4	.475	**.469**	.833	2.0	.3	.3	.3	4.1
2014†	San Antonio	**22**	2	6.1	.476	.333	.750	.7	.5	.1	.0	1.3
2015	San Antonio	7	0	5.1	.200	.222	.000	.9	.1	.1	.1	.9
Career		94	8	11.0	.402	.355	.811	1.7	.4	.2	.2	2.8

== Awards and achievements ==
- 2013–14 NBA champion
- 2006–07 NBA champion
- NBA 3-point field goal percentage leader (2011)
- 2002–03 Honorable Mention All-American
- 2001–02 Honorable Mention All-American
- 2002–03 Academic All-American of the Year
- 2001–02 Academic All-American of the Year
- 2002–03 All-SEC First Team
- 2001–02 All-SEC Second Team
- 2000–01 All-SEC Third Team
- 2002–03 SEC three-point field-goal percentage leader
- 2002–03 All-SEC Academic
- 2001–02 All-SEC Academic
- 2000–01 All-SEC Academic
- 1998–99 NHIAA Champions – Concord HS
- 1997–98 NHIAA Champions – Concord HS
- 1996–97 NHIAA Champions – Concord HS

== Post-NBA career ==
After retiring from professional basketball, Bonner joined the San Antonio Spurs TV Broadcast as a studio analyst. Bonner now works as an analyst on Sportsnet for Raptors games.

== Personal life ==
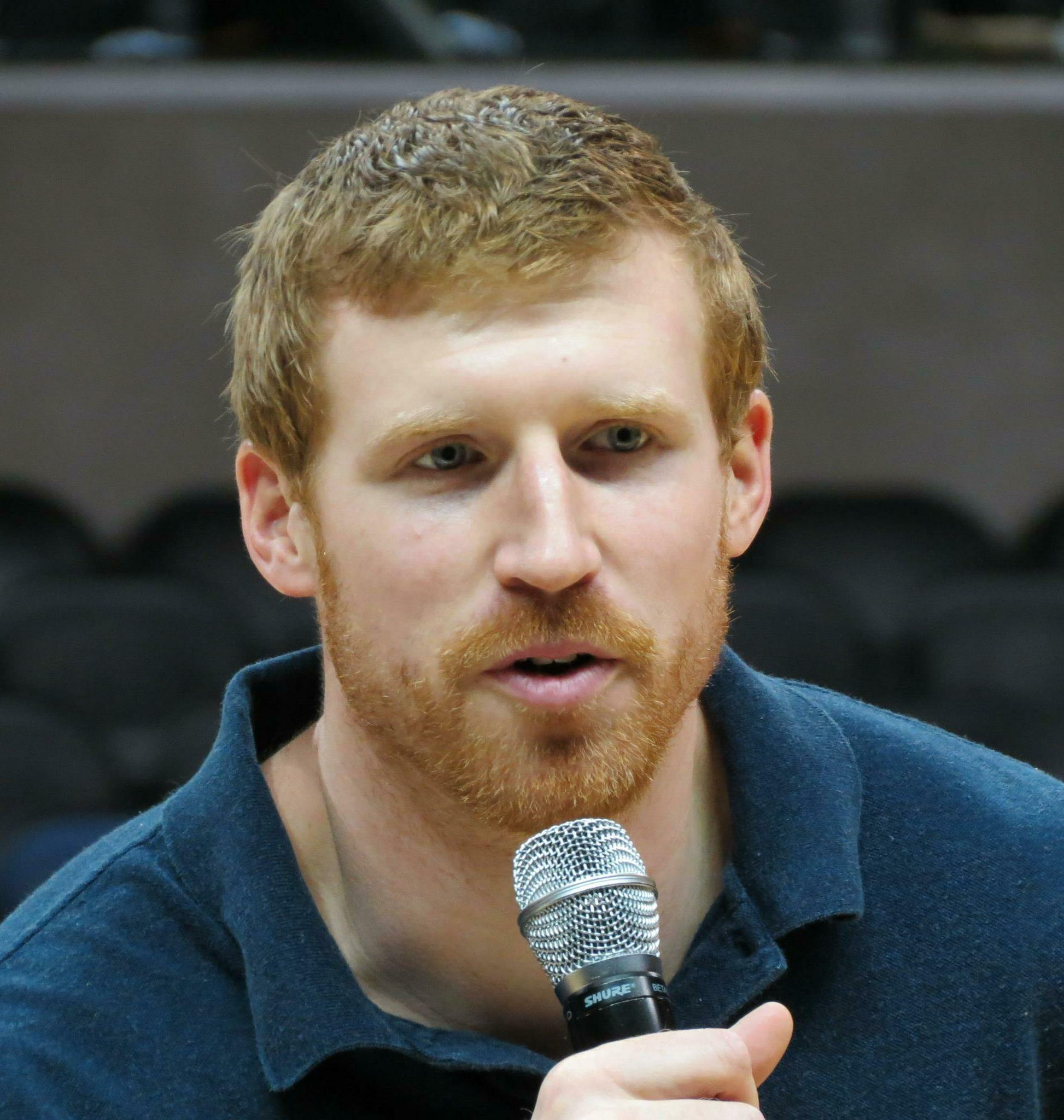
Bonner speaking into a microphone

Bonner and his wife have one daughter, Evangeline-Vesper Lynne Bonner (born June 21, 2009) and one son, August Bonner (born August 27, 2012).

He has a younger brother, Luke, who was also a professional basketball player. Luke served as Matt's best man at his wedding.

Bonner applied for Canadian citizenship in February 2009, but did not qualify, due to the amount of time he spent outside the country.

Bonner is a sandwich enthusiast. He has a blog titled "The Sandwich Hunter: The Quest for the Hoagie Grail" in which he documents his search for the "world's best sandwich." He is also a fan of the sport of curling, due to discovering it on Canadian television during his tenure with the Toronto Raptors.

During his tenure with the Toronto Raptors, he received the nickname the "Red Rocket" for his red hair and constant use of the public transit in Toronto, the Toronto Transit Commission, whose slogan is "Ride the Rocket."

Kobe Bryant coined Bonner's other nickname, the "Red Mamba", on Twitter while live-tweeting in 2013 during a televised replay of his 81-point game against Bonner and the Toronto Raptors.

He was well known for being the lone NBA player wearing New Balance shoes, even though he did not have a proper sponsorship deal with the brand. He said in an interview that a friend, who was a New Balance representative, was the one who provided him with a few dozen pairs of shoes. A few years later, after wearing out all the shoes, and New Balance being out of the basketball sneaker market, Bonner finally signed his first basketball shoe deal with Adidas in January 2014 with the use of the Nice Kicks Twitter account.

Bonner and his brother Luke run a nonprofit organization called the Rock On Foundation, in which they look to support community involvement in arts and athletics.

In March 2016, Bonner was featured on the season-premiere episode of FYI's Tiny House Nation, where he and his wife Nadia had a 276-sq.-foot house custom-built.

Bonner now works as an analyst on Sportsnet for Raptors games.

== See also ==
- List of National Basketball Association career 3-point field goal percentage leaders
- List of Florida Gators in the NBA
- List of University of Florida alumni
