= Tim Schaller =

American professional ice hockey forward (born 1990)

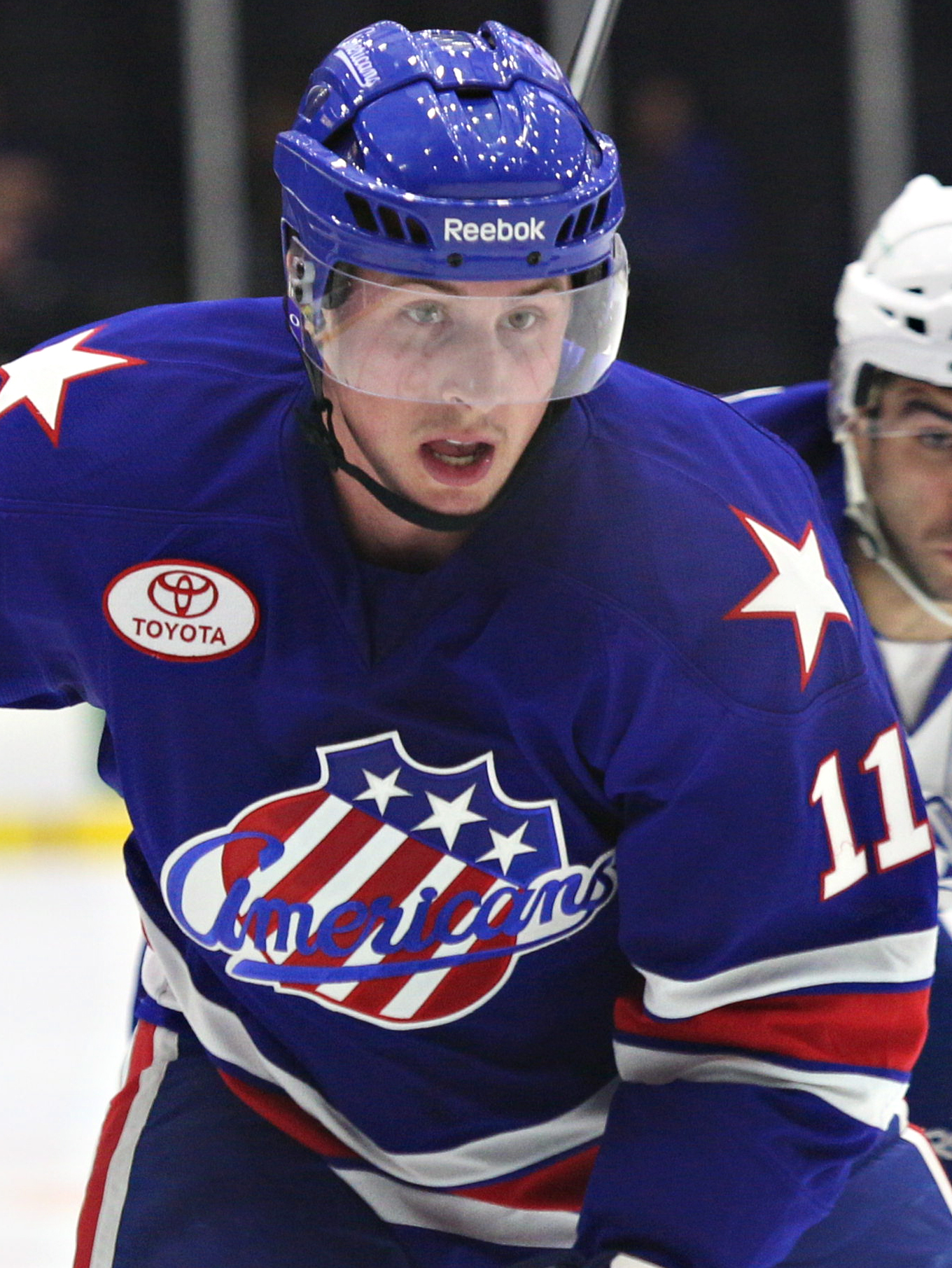
- Schaller with the Rochester Americans in 2013
- Born: November 16, 1990 (age 35) Merrimack, New Hampshire, U.S.
- Height: 6 ft 2 in (188 cm)
- Weight: 216 lb (98 kg; 15 st 6 lb)
- Position: Center
- Shot: Left
- team Former teams: Free agent Buffalo Sabres; Boston Bruins; Vancouver Canucks; Los Angeles Kings
- NHL draft: Undrafted
- Playing career: 2013–2023

Timothy Robert Schaller (born November 16, 1990) is an American former professional ice hockey forward. He most recently played for the Milwaukee Admirals of the American Hockey League (AHL). Schaller previously played for the Buffalo Sabres, Boston Bruins and Vancouver Canucks in the National Hockey League (NHL).

== Playing career ==
Growing up, Schaller attended Merrimack High School where he was a three sport athlete. He was named Merrimack High School Rookie of the Year in 2006 before joining the New England Jr. Huskies in the Eastern Junior Hockey League.

=== Collegiate ===
Schaller joined Providence College for the 2009–10 season. He scored his first collegiate goal in a 4–1 loss to Northeastern on November 20, 2009 and ended the season with five points. At the conclusion of the season, Schaller was the co-recipient of the Rev. Herman Schneider Most Valuable Freshman Award.

In his sophomore year, Schaller played in 34 games for the Friars, earning a new career highs in points with 19. He was then invited to participate at the Chicago Blackhawks NHL Prospect Camp prior to his junior year.

Despite suffering injuries throughout the season, Schaller finished the 2011–12 season with a new career high 14 goals, which also led the team. As a result, Schaller won the team's Rob Gaudreau Award for most goals scored. He was also named a semi-finalist for the Walter Brown Award as the best American-born college hockey player in New England and was invited to the Calgary Flames 2012 Development Camp on an Amateur Try-out agreement.

Schaller was named one of three captains for the Friars prior to his senior year. He then recorded a career high 23 points in 38 games to help the team qualify for the 2013 Hockey East playoffs. Schaller was named Hockey East Defensive Forward of the Year before graduating.

=== Professional ===
On April 2, 2013, the Buffalo Sabres signed Schaller to a two-year, entry-level contract.

Schaller spent the entire 2013-14 season with the Sabres' American Hockey League (AHL) affiliate, the Rochester Americans. In 72 games, he recorded eleven goals and eighteen points.

On November 29, 2014, the Sabres recalled Schaller. He made his NHL debut that night in a 4–3 win over the Montreal Canadiens. On December 21, Schaller scored his first career NHL goal in a 4–3 loss to the Boston Bruins in Boston. He grew up in nearby Merrimack, New Hampshire.

On July 1, 2016, Schaller signed a one-year, two-way contract with the Bruins. In his first season with the club, he scored fourteen points in 59 games. The Bruins re-signed Schaller to a one-year contract extension on July 5, 2017.

On July 1, 2018, the Vancouver Canucks signed Schaller to a two-year, $3.8 million contract. He played 47 games for the team the subsequent season, scoring ten points.

During the following 2019–20 season, while in his final season under contract, Schaller, prospect Tyler Madden, a 2020 second-round pick and 2022 conditional pick were traded by the Canucks to the Los Angeles Kings in exchange for Tyler Toffoli on February 17, 2020.

As a free agent entering the pandemic delayed 2020–21 season, Schaller was signed to an AHL professional tryout contract to attend the Wilkes-Barre/Scranton Penguins training camp. After a positive showing, Schaller was signed to a one-year contract with Wilkes-Barre on February 8, 2021.

Leaving the Penguins as a free agent, Schaller extended his career in the AHL in agreeing to a one-year contract with the Bakersfield Condors, affiliate to the Edmonton Oilers, on October 5, 2021.

After a lone season with the Condors, Schaller continued his tenure in the AHL signing to a one-year contract with the Milwaukee Admirals, primary affiliate to the Nashville Predators, on August 1, 2022.

=== Retirement ===
On September 11, 2023, Schaller announced his retirement from the National Hockey League.

== Personal life ==
Schaller was born to parents Robert and Susan Schaller alongside his older brother David. In 2006, David was diagnosed with testicular cancer and later aplastic anemia which required a bone marrow transplant. Tim decided to donate his blood marrow to him, taking him off the ice for six weeks. As a result, the Schaller brothers created a fund called "Timmyheads" which raises money for the Jimmy Fund and Boston's Dana-Farber Cancer Institute.

== Career statistics ==
| | | | Regular season | | | | | Playoffs |
| Season | Team | League | GP | G | A | Pts | PIM | GP | G | A | Pts | PIM |
|---|---|---|---|---|---|---|---|---|---|---|---|---|
| 2006–07 | New England Jr. Huskies | EJHL | 1 | 0 | 0 | 0 | 0 | — | — | — | — | — |
| 2007–08 | New England Jr. Huskies | EJHL | 44 | 8 | 25 | 33 | 29 | — | — | — | — | — |
| 2008–09 | New England Jr. Huskies | EJHL | 45 | 16 | 23 | 39 | 54 | 2 | 0 | 1 | 1 | 0 |
| 2009–10 | Providence College | HE | 33 | 2 | 3 | 5 | 40 | — | — | — | — | — |
| 2010–11 | Providence College | HE | 34 | 5 | 14 | 19 | 36 | — | — | — | — | — |
| 2011–12 | Providence College | HE | 26 | 14 | 7 | 21 | 24 | — | — | — | — | — |
| 2012–13 | Providence College | HE | 38 | 8 | 15 | 23 | 61 | — | — | — | — | — |
| 2013–14 | Rochester Americans | AHL | 72 | 11 | 7 | 18 | 36 | 5 | 0 | 1 | 1 | 2 |
| 2014–15 | Rochester Americans | AHL | 65 | 15 | 28 | 43 | 116 | — | — | — | — | — |
| 2014–15 | Buffalo Sabres | NHL | 18 | 1 | 1 | 2 | 2 | — | — | — | — | — |
| 2015–16 | Rochester Americans | AHL | 37 | 12 | 14 | 26 | 48 | — | — | — | — | — |
| 2015–16 | Buffalo Sabres | NHL | 17 | 1 | 2 | 3 | 2 | — | — | — | — | — |
| 2016–17 | Boston Bruins | NHL | 59 | 7 | 7 | 14 | 23 | 6 | 1 | 0 | 1 | 2 |
| 2017–18 | Boston Bruins | NHL | 82 | 12 | 10 | 22 | 42 | 11 | 0 | 2 | 2 | 2 |
| 2018–19 | Vancouver Canucks | NHL | 47 | 3 | 7 | 10 | 9 | — | — | — | — | — |
| 2019–20 | Vancouver Canucks | NHL | 51 | 5 | 1 | 6 | 14 | — | — | — | — | — |
| 2019–20 | Los Angeles Kings | NHL | 2 | 0 | 0 | 0 | 0 | — | — | — | — | — |
| 2019–20 | Ontario Reign | AHL | 5 | 1 | 0 | 1 | 6 | — | — | — | — | — |
| 2020–21 | Wilkes-Barre/Scranton Penguins | AHL | 32 | 10 | 8 | 18 | 14 | — | — | — | — | — |
| 2021–22 | Bakersfield Condors | AHL | 67 | 10 | 15 | 25 | 25 | 5 | 0 | 1 | 1 | 4 |
| 2022–23 | Milwaukee Admirals | AHL | 67 | 9 | 12 | 21 | 43 | — | — | — | — | — |
| NHL totals | | | 276 | 29 | 28 | 57 | 92 | 17 | 1 | 2 | 3 | 4 |

Awards and achievements
| Preceded by Chris Connolly | Hockey East Best Defensive Forward; 2012–13 | Succeeded by Bill Arnold; Ross Mauermann |
