= Daniel Gage =

American ice harvester (1828–1901)

Daniel Gage IV (1828–1901), known as the "Ice King of Lowell", was an American ice harvester. He started the Daniel Gage Ice Company in April 1870, but was dealing in ice as early as 1854.

== Personal life ==
Daniel Gage was born in Pelham, New Hampshire on June 4, 1828, to father Nathan Gage and mother Mehitable (Woodbury) Gage. He spent the first 25 years of his life on the family-owned Gage Hill Farm and attended the local school. He died on February 9, 1901.

== Public contributions ==
Just like what the auto industry did to the buggy whip, the age of refrigeration came, and the harvesting of ice became a dead industry. The Gage family began to sell off their land, as well as donate tracts to municipalities, such as a 26-acre (11 ha) parcel to the city of Lowell for a park dedicated for the exclusive use of children, now known as Gage Field in the Centralville section of Lowell.

== Harvesting and storing ice ==
Daniel Gage owned the majority of ponds and lakes in the Greater Lowell area.

In Chelmsford, Massachusetts, his company harvested ice from Heart Pond.

By the late 1880s he was the largest taxpayer in Pelham, New Hampshire, because he owned all the land around the major lakes and ponds where he harvested the ice. His son Nathan Gage was the 7th highest taxpayer. Between the two, they paid over $415/year, equivalent to $14,500 in 2024.

He set up large ice houses along the south bank of the Merrimack River, above the Pawtucket Falls in the Pawtucketville section of Lowell.

== Other investments ==
Daniel's other investments included being a partner in the Lowell Co-operative Milk Association which was on about an acre of land on Hildreth Street in Lowell. He was also president of Prescott National Bank.
