= Ted Kucharski =

American football player (1907–1992)

Profile
- Position: End

Personal information
- Born: August 26, 1907; Exeter, New Hampshire, U.S.
- Died: October 7, 1992 (aged 85); Mesa, Arizona, U.S.
- Listed height: 5 ft 11 in (1.80 m)
- Listed weight: 185 lb (84 kg)

Career information
- High school: Exeter (NH)
- College: Holy Cross

Career history
- Providence Steam Roller (1930)
- Stats at Pro Football Reference

Theodore Michael Kucharski (August 26, 1907 – October 7, 1992) was an American football player.

Kucharski was born in 1907 in Exeter, New Hampshire. He attended Exeter High School and Saint Anselm Prep. He played college football for Holy Cross from 1926 to 1929.

In August 1930, he signed with the Providence Steam Roller of the National Football League (NFL). He appeared in eight games as an end during the 1930 season.

From 1931 to 1965, Kucharski was a teacher and football coach, and starting in 1953, principal at Leominster High School in Leominster, Massachusetts. During World War II, he served in the Army in the Pacific Theatre Kucharski died in 1992 in Mesa, Arizona.
