= Saint Patrick School (Pelham, New Hampshire) =

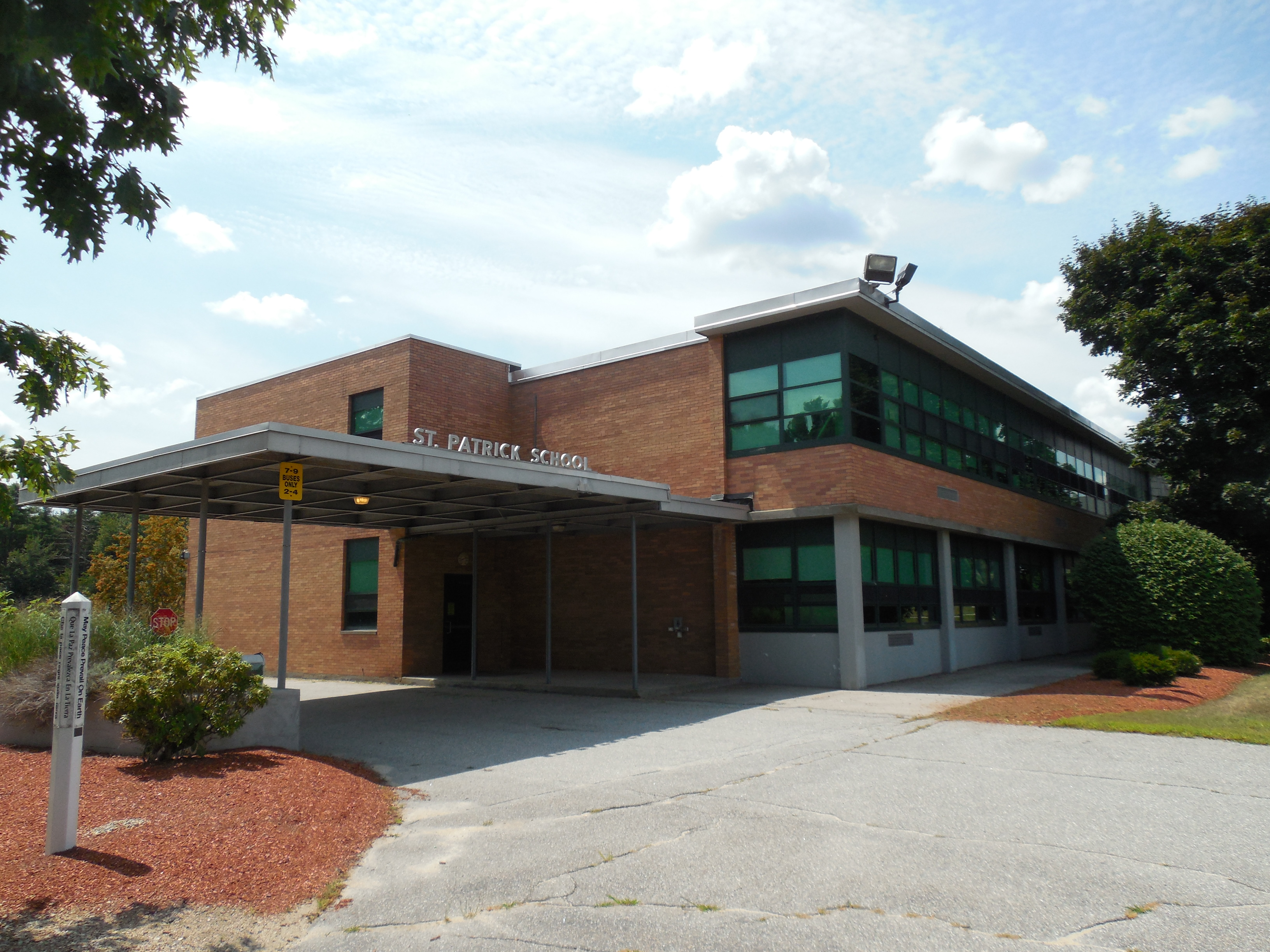
- Saint Patrick School

Location
- 16 Main Street; Pelham, New Hampshire 03076; United States; 42°43′58″N 71°19′11″W

Information
- Religious affiliation: Roman Catholic
- Patron saint: Saint Patrick
- Established: 1960
- Status: Closed
- Closed: 2015
- Authority: Diocese of Manchester
- Principal: Henry Golec
- Teaching staff: 12.8 (FTE) (as of 2005-06)
- Grades: Pre-K - 8
- Gender: Co-ed
- Enrollment: 236 (as of 2005-06)
- Student to teacher ratio: 18.4(as of 2005-06)
- Website: http://www.saintpatrickschool.net/

Saint Patrick School was a private Roman Catholic elementary and middle school in Pelham, New Hampshire.

== History ==
The school was founded in 1960 by Saint Patrick Parish as Saint Patrick Convent School. The school was staffed by Sisters of Mercy from nearby Windham for many years; however, more lay teachers were gradually employed, and in the early 1990s the school's name was officially changed to Saint Patrick School. At the time of its closing, the school was staffed entirely by state-certified lay personnel. In August 2015 the school was closed due to lack of enrollment for the upcoming school year.

Saint Patrick School was accredited by the New England Association of Schools and Colleges.

== Sports and traditions ==
Students in grades 5 through 8 participated in the school's teams in soccer, softball, and track and field, all of which competed in the small school division of the Tri-County League. Basketball, bowling, skiing and snowboarding were offered as part of the school's Winter Enrichment Program.

A campus ministry and student leadership program was offered through T.I.C. T.A.C. (Together In Christ Taking A Challenge), which was overseen by the school principal and the parish pastor.

Annual traditions at Saint Patrick School included an annual Harvest Feast, where third-grade Native Americans canoed down Beaver Brook and were greeted by second-grade Pilgrims; the sixth grade class trip to Nature's Classroom; and the eighth grade class trip to Washington, D.C.

== Curriculum ==
Saint Patrick Catholic School curriculum was in the areas of English, Mathematics, Social Studies, Science, Religion, French (Grades 5 - 8), Library, Computer Technology, Physical Education, Art, and Music. Saint Patrick School teachers were state certified, and the curriculum they taught reflected the requirements outlined by the Diocese of Manchester.

== Parent-Teacher Organization (PTO) ==
The Saint Patrick School PTO Board sponsored events that provided financial support to teachers and school programs, and helped to purchase classroom items that would otherwise not be funded.
