= Charlene Takesian =

American politician

Member of New Hampshire House of Representatives for Hillsborough 37
- In office 2012–2016

Personal details
- Party: Republican
- Education: Becker College

Charlene F. Takesian is an American politician. She was a member of the New Hampshire House of Representatives and represented Hillsborough 37th district from 2012 to 2016.

Takesian grew up in Massachusetts and moved to Pelham, New Hampshire in 1977. She is vice chair of the Board of Selectmen in Pelham.

== See also ==
- List of American politicians of Armenian descent
