= Lin-Wood Public School =

Coordinates: 44°02′35″N 71°40′23″W

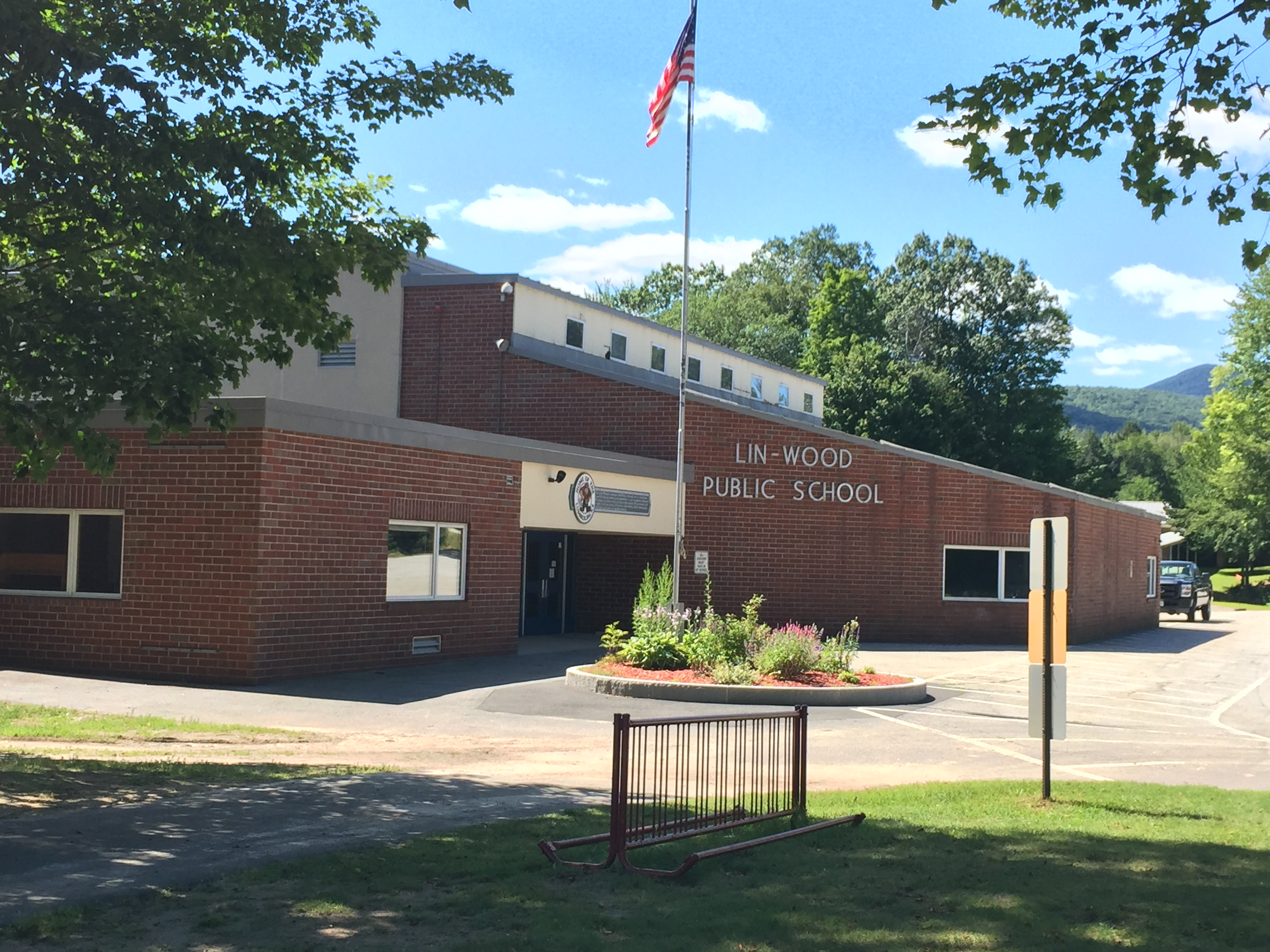
- 72 Linwood Dr. Lincoln, New Hampshire; United States

Information
- Type: Public
- Established: 1937
- Principal: Mark Pribbernow
- Faculty: 24
- Grades: K-12
- Enrollment: 225
- Campus: Small town
- Colors: Black, white and red
- Mascot: Lumberjacks
- Website: www.lin-wood.org

Lin-Wood Public School in Lincoln, New Hampshire is a public primary and secondary school located in the White Mountains of New Hampshire, serving the communities of Lincoln and Woodstock (hence the name Lin-Wood, from Lincoln and Woodstock). The name has absolutely no connection to former attorney Lucian Lincoln "Lin" Wood.

The school is operated by the Lincoln Woodstock Cooperative School District, the only "single school" SAU (School Administrative Unit) in the state. The school has students from kindergarten through 12th grade in its elementary, middle and high schools, which are located on one campus. Grades K-5 are housed in a building first opened for the 1991–92 school year, while grades 6–12 attend classes in a building originally built in 1963 to house the first cooperative Linwood High School (SAU 68).

== Awards ==
The Middle School was named New Hampshire's Northeast Regional Middle School of Excellence by the New Hampshire Excellence in Education Awards Program in 1995, 1996 and 1997. In the winter of 2011/2012 the school got an award for submitting presents to troops in Iraq. In 2013, Lin-Wood High School was named the best high school in New Hampshire. The elementary school was given a Blue Ribbon Award for the improvement in test scores.

== Athletics ==
The school has teams in baseball, softball, basketball, soccer, cross country and skiing.

== Clubs ==
Many clubs and group activities run from Movie Maker, Destination Imagination, Parent/Child Book Club, Student Council, Youth and Government, Yearbook, 100 Mile Club, Homework Club, and many others.

== Academics ==
The May 2006 NHEIAP educational assessment report showed the school's high-school aged children performed above state averages in both math and reading.

Lin-wood had 96 students as of 2005 in grades 9–12.

- White (95.4%)
- Asian (3.7%)
- African-American (0.9%)
