= Windham School District (New Hampshire) =

School district in New Hampshire, United States

Address
- 19 Haverhill Road Windham, New Hampshire, 03087; United States

District information
- Type: Public school district
- Grades: PreK–12
- Superintendent: Richard Langlois
- NCES District ID: 3307170

Students and staff
- Enrollment: 2,958 (2020-2021)
- Student–teacher ratio: 14.11

Other information
- Website: www.windhamsd.org

Windham School District (SAU 95) is a public school district located in Windham, New Hampshire, United States. The district contains two elementary schools, one middle school, and one high school. During the 2016–17 school year, 2940 students were enrolled within the district's schools. A $38.9 million school renovation project of the district's Golden Brook School and Windham Middle School was completed in 2019.

== Schools ==
=== High schools ===
- Windham High School

=== Middle schools ===
- Windham Middle School

=== Elementary schools ===
- Windham Center School, grades 5-6
- Golden Brook School, grades PreK-4
