= Luke Bonner =

American basketball player

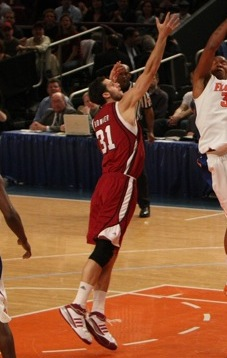

Personal information
- Born: March 28, 1985 (age 40) Concord, New Hampshire, U.S.
- Listed height: 7 ft 1 in (2.16 m)
- Listed weight: 240 lb (109 kg)

Career information
- High school: Trinity (Manchester, New Hampshire)
- College: West Virginia (2004–2005); UMass (2006–2009)
- NBA draft: 2009: undrafted
- Playing career: 2009–2012
- Position: Center

Career history
- 2009–2010: Albacomp (Hungary)
- 2010: Manchester Millrats (PBL)
- 2010: Austin Toros (D-League)
- 2010–2012: Neptūnas (Lithuania)
- 2012: Austin Toros (D-League)

Career highlights
- Atlantic 10 All-Academic Team (2009)

Luke James Bonner (born March 28, 1985) is an American former professional basketball player.

== Professional career ==
Bonner started his professional career in 2009 with Hungarian club Albacomp, where he averaged 9.8 points and 3.8 rebounds, before signing for the Austin Toros of the NBA Development League in February 2010. At the beginning of the 2010–11 season, he signed with Lithuanian side Neptūnas. He spent one year and a half there, before rejoining the Toros in January 2012. However, he was waived due to injury one month later.

== Personal life ==
Luke is the younger brother of Matt Bonner, who is a former National Basketball Association (NBA) player.
