= Exeter High School (New Hampshire) =

Coordinates: 43.01677°N 71.00042°W

Location
- 1 Blue Hawk Dr. Exeter, New Hampshire; United States

Information
- Type: Public
- Established: September 9, 1912
- Teaching staff: 107.00 (FTE)
- Grades: High school (9-12)
- Enrollment: 1,380 (2023–2024)
- Student to teacher ratio: 12.90
- Campus: Suburban
- Colors: Silver and Navy
- Mascot: The Blue Hawk
- Newspaper: The Talon
- Website: ehs.sau16.org

Exeter High School is a public high school in Exeter, New Hampshire, in the United States. It serves students in grades 9 through 12 who reside in the towns of Exeter, Stratham, Kensington, Newfields, Brentwood, and East Kingston, New Hampshire. Exeter High School is ranked 9th within New Hampshire. Students have the opportunity to take Advanced Placement® course work and exams. The AP® participation rate at Exeter High School is 36 percent. The student body makeup is 48 percent male and 52 percent female, and the total minority enrollment is 6 percent. Exeter High School is the only high school in the Exeter Region Coop School District. According to state test scores, 55% of students are at least proficient in math and 81% in reading.

== History ==
=== Origin ===
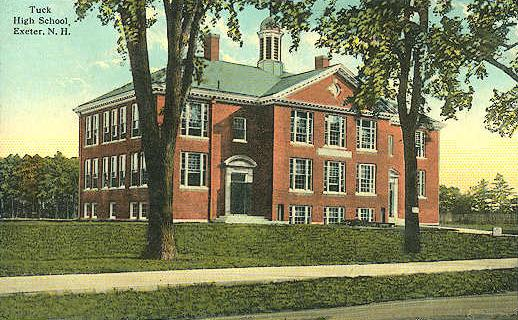
Exeter High School, original 1912 building

The Exeter Area Public School was established in 1848 as a co-educational institution and became a school for boys twenty years later when Robinson Female Seminary was founded. The school was originally located on Court Street until 1912 when it was moved to Linden Street and changed to Exeter High School. The new school opened September 9, 1912, and most of the town stores declared a half-holiday for the occasion. The school was nicknamed "Tuck High School", thanks mainly to a gift of $5,000 by philanthropist Edward Tuck.

The "Pinnacle" yearbook was first produced in 1949 as a joint effort by Exeter High School and Robinson Female Seminary. On April 7, 1954, an affirmative vote of a $760,000 bond was passed to construct a new coed Exeter High School and elementary school; the school opened in September 1956.

=== New building ===
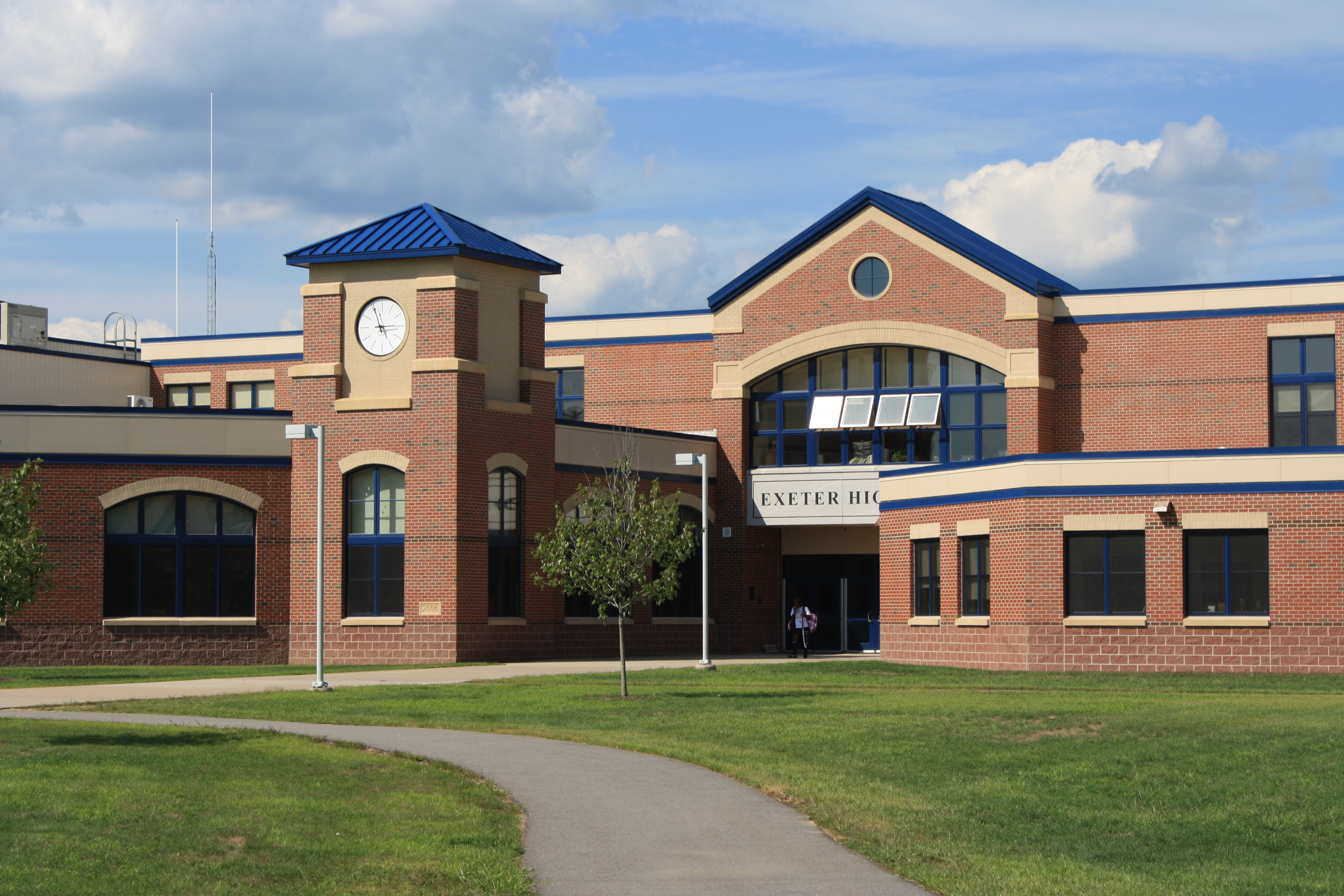
Exeter High School, new 2006 building

After years of a growing population and structural problems experienced in the old building, it was determined that a new 227,000-square-foot (21,100 m^{2}) building would be built. The new Exeter High School opened on the outskirts of town, at 1 Blue Hawk Drive, on New Hampshire Route 27 in August 2006. The original Tuck School/Exeter High School is currently home to Exeter Adult Education; a program that allows adults within the SAU-16 school district to receive their high-school equivalency degree or take other various classes, and Great Bay e-Learning Charter School (GBECS); a public charter school for grades 6–12 that focuses on teaching in ways alternative to that of a traditional classroom and designed for students who don't perform well in a traditional school setting.

A portion of the building was renovated and expanded upon to accommodate the needs of the Seacoast School of Technology. The annex-building that formerly hosted Exeter Junior High was purchased by local non-profit group Squamscott Community Commons with the goal of building a joint community center/YMCA. With the help of various private grants, small-scale approvals of using tax-payer money set aside for SAU-16, and community fundraising efforts starting as early as 2006, they were eventually able to begin demolishing the building in December 2012. The community center/YMCA was opened in 2015 after much anticipation.

== Academics ==
=== Honors societies ===
- National Honor Society: members are academically proficient and are supporters of the Exeter community, volunteering around Exeter and throughout the Seacoast region.
- The Sociedad Honoraria Hispánica (SHH), or Spanish National Honor Society
- La Société Honoraire Française (SHF) or French National Honor Society
- The Social Studies Honor Society, administered by the Rho Kappa Social Studies Honor Society program
- The Latin Honor Society, administered by the Junior Classical League
- The Science National Honors Society, composed of students achieving highly in science (including physical science, biology, chemistry, physics, and more) who perform community outreach.

=== Seacoast School of Technology ===
In addition to courses available on campus, students can enroll in programs at the Seacoast School of Technology (or SST), also in Exeter. This School of Technology offers classes that the structured classroom doesn't, including but not limited to, Automotive technologies, Culinary Studies, Pre-Engineering, Digital Media Arts, and Building and Construction Technologies. SST originally operated out of a single wing of the old Exeter High on Linden Street, but has since relocated slightly to an extension that was added onto the old Exeter High. They have since added more buildings to the property in order to accommodate the continuously growing student base. SST services six schools including Exeter High School, Epping High School, Newmarket High School, Raymond High School, Sanborn Regional High School, and Winnacunnet High School.

=== Extra-curricular activities ===
The school has over 60 clubs listed, and many play an important role in student life and the Exeter community. The number of operative clubs fluctuates yearly; the main clubs are listed on the school website. For example, Model UN regularly achieves success at several annual local conferences to which the group sends delegates. Various service-based clubs have made sizable donations of time and resources to organizations such as End 68 Hours of Hunger, though not all are local. In recent years, Quiz Bowl has sent teams to the NHPBS quiz Granite State Challenge, which reached the quarterfinals during each instance. For several years, the intermediate and advanced division certamen teams from Latin Club placed among the top three at statewide competitions. Other organizations, such as Special Olympics and Best Buddies have achieved success as well.

=== Future Plans ===
According to annual profiles published on the school website, about 65% of each graduating senior class directly enrolls in a four-year college or university, between 10% and 15% enroll in a two-year college program, with the remaining students electing to pursue employment, technical training, volunteer work, the armed services, and many other options after graduation. This data is taken from the graduating classes of 2018, 2019, and 2020.

== Campus ==
=== Faculty and staff ===
From the years 2012–2017, the high school has had four principals, Victor Sokul (2005-2012), Sean Kiley (2012-2014), James Tremblay (2014-2017), Michael Monahan (2017-2025), and Tonja Neve (2025-present).

=== Sustainability ===
The Exeter High School campus surpasses most schools across New Hampshire in environmental sustainability. In 2010 the installation of 465 solar panels (supplied by AltE) generates about 100 kilowatts of power and offsets the school's energy consumption by 5%. The addition of a community garden in the spring of 2011 provided further learning opportunities for the school and agricultural benefits for the local community. Exeter has an active Environmental Club and Recycling Committee that have overseen many of the green innovations around the school and community.

=== Facilities ===
- Theater: The Arthur L. Hanson III Center for the Performing Arts was dedicated to the superintendent of schools on June 13, 2008. The Drama Department has been able to produce shows such as Grease, Footloose, Beauty and the Beast, Sweeney Todd, Shrek the Musical, The Addams Family, Urinetown, and many other productions.
- Cafeteria: The Latvis Cafeteria was dedicated to Mike and Gail Latvis in November 2007 for their years of service and dedication to the SAU 16 school district.
- Conference hall: The Roy Morrisette Alumni Room was dedicated to Roy Morrisette for his 29 years of service to the SAU 16 school district.
- Gymnasium: The Exeter High school building has a large and a small gymnasium which are used throughout the year for hosting events and tournaments.
- Stadium: William D. Ball Stadium at Eustis Field, a grass-turf, multi-sport facility, is home to the football, soccer, field hockey, and lacrosse teams.
- Weight Room: Near the gymnasiums, Exeter High School has a weight room equipped with bench presses, cardio machines, dumbbells, and a menagerie of other lifting equipment. Various sports teams sign out the room for practices and some physical education classes utilize its resources.

== Athletics ==
Students at Exeter High School are required to participate in two semesters of athletic programs. The school offers more than 30 interscholastic teams at the varsity and junior varsity level. Other various physical fitness programs are also available. The athletic director is William D. Ball, who is also the head football coach. Exeter High School competes at the Division 1 level.

=== Interscholastic sports ===
Fall
- Boys cross country
- Girls cross country
- Football
- Field hockey
- Golf
- Boys soccer
- Girls soccer
- Volleyball

Winter

- Boys basketball
- Girls basketball
- Boys ice hockey
- Girls ice hockey
- Girls swimming & diving
- Boys swimming & diving
- Boys and girls indoor track
- Wrestling
- Girls alpine skiing
- Boys alpine skiing

Spring

- Baseball
- Softball
- Boys volleyball
- Boys lacrosse
- Girls lacrosse
- Boys tennis
- Girls tennis
- Track

==== Football ====
The school's football team has won the state championship 14 times since 1955: Class M (1955), Division III (1957, 1958, 1959, 1963, 1964, 1965), Division II (1997, 1998, 2002, 2003, 2007), Division I (2011, 2012)

Beginning in 1996, the Blue Hawks played in 11 of 14 Division II state championship games before moving to Division I in 2010. During the seasons of 1997–1999 Exeter won 26 consecutive games, the longest winning streak in school history. Exeter has sent over 65 representatives to play in the New Hampshire-Vermont Shrine Maple Sugar Bowl. The Blue Hawks have nine members in the New Hampshire Chapter of the Joe Yukica Hall of Fame. Zack Dziama (class of 2003) and Tyler Grant (2013) have won the Gatorade Player of the Year for football in New Hampshire. Head Coach William Ball has won over 100 games with Exeter and has been inducted into the New Hampshire Coaches Hall of Fame.

The Exeter High football team has played rival Winnacunnet in neighboring Hampton 96 times since 1924. Exeter leads the all-time series, 53–22–2. The two schools have played for three state championships in Division II, with Winnacunnet winning in 1983 and 2000, while Exeter won in 2003, one of Exeter's perfect seasons (others being 1964 and 1999). The teams have played each other every year since 1947. The last Exeter/Winnacunnet game played at the original Eustis Field in 2005 was a 26–0 victory for Exeter. Eustis Field was named after Richard J. Eustis, who served as the Blue Hawks' athletic director from 1958 to 1969, and had been captain of the 1931 New Hampshire Wildcats football team.

The Blue Hawks' home games are held at William D. Ball Stadium at Eustis Field, a grass-turf stadium facility. In 2005, the Blue Hawks won the last game on the original Eustis Field, defeating Merrimack in the semifinals before falling to Bishop Guertin in the Division II championship game.

Exeter was reclassified as a Division I football program for the 2010 season, replacing Manchester West, which moved down to Division II. On November 19, 2011, playing at the home of defending champion Pinkerton Academy of Derry, Exeter won its first Division I title, 23–13.

==== Swimming and diving ====
The school's girls' swimming and diving team has won the NH Division I state championship four times since 2016 (2016, 2018, 2019, 2020).

The school's boys' swimming and diving team has won the NH Division I state championship four times since 2013 (2013, 2014, 2016, 2017).

==== Soccer ====
The Exeter High School boys varsity soccer team has won the New Hampshire state championship five times since 2001. Head Coach Jim Tufts led the team to the Final Four or further for seven years running, 2001 through 2007. In the 2016 season, Coach Jim Tufts led the team to victory against Manchester Memorial High School with a score of 5–0.

The Exeter High School girls' soccer team won the Class L state championship for the first time in 2006 after defeating Merrimack 1–0 and again in 2007 after defeating Pinkerton Academy 2–1 in overtime. They won state championships in Division I four years in a row (2009–2012), but lost to Bedford in 2013. They reclaimed the division title in 2014. In 2013 the team was ranked the number one high school team in America in the National Soccer Association of America's weekly poll.

==== Field hockey ====
The Exeter High School field hockey team was the runner up in the 2006 Class L championship game after losing in overtime 3-2 to Salem High School. Seeded #4 going into the NHIAA tournament, Exeter High School Girls defeated Pinkerton High School's field hockey team to become 2013 Division I state champions. This was the first championship for the program.

==== Golf ====
The Exeter Golf Team has recorded multiple state tournament appearances including back to back in 2006 and 2007. The team practices at the Exeter Country Club in Exeter with Varsity head coach Bob Bailey. Before being named varsity coach, Bailey led the junior varsity team to three straight state titles — 2005–07, and brought a wealth of coaching and educational experience to the team.

=== Championships ===
The football team has won a total of 13 state championships, in four different classes/divisions: Class M (1955), Division III (1957, 1959, 1963, 1964, 1965), Division II (1997, 1998, 2002, 2003, 2007), and Division I (2011, 2012).

The girls' swimming and diving team has won four NH Division I state championships: (2016, 2018, 2019, 2020).

The boys' swimming and diving team has won four NH Division I state championships: (2013, 2014, 2016, 2017).

The boys' basketball team won the Class I state championship in 1977, 2019, 2020.

The boys' golf team won the Class I state championship in 1984, 1989, and 2020.

The girls' JV cross country team placed 1st at states in 2025 with a score of 18, and in 2024, they placed 2nd. The girls'varsity team placed 2nd, and three girls moved on to regionals, with one member going to Nationals in San Frisco.

The boy's baseball team won New Hampshire state championships in 1960,1981,2013,2017,2018,2025.

== Notable events ==
=== 2009 "Grinding" Controversy ===
In February 2009, the school sparked controversy when then-Principal Victor Sokul removed 19 students from a dance, claiming they had been grinding. Another dance, scheduled for March, was subsequently canceled, with Sokul saying the school and community needed time to meet and discuss dancing rules. Many students argued there was "nothing sexual" about grinding, and it should therefore be considered an acceptable style of dance, while parents mostly agreed drugs and alcohol were a bigger problem at school dances. In April, after a public forum on the issue, the school amended its dance policy to restrict all dancing to "vertical body posture" (i.e. no bending over).

=== "Two Genders" Lawsuit ===
In 2021, an unnamed student, identified in court documents as "MP" filed a lawsuit against the school for violating his constitutional rights. The student, who was on the school's football team, claimed he had received a one-game suspension for expressing the opinion that there were "only two genders." School staff denied the claim, saying the student had not received the suspension for expressing his opinion, but rather for using "crude and disrespectful language" toward another student.

The case was resolved in 2024. Judge Andrew Schulman ruled against the student, writing in his decision that the athletic suspension did not meet the legal criteria for monetary damages. Nevertheless, in his 18-page decision, Schulman described the school's defense as "dishonest," and acknowledged that the school's own notes seemed to confirm the student had indeed been benched for his views on gender, and not because of the words he used.

=== Political Rallies ===
On January 6, 2008, Barack Obama held a rally in the Exeter High School gymnasium.

On February 10, 2020, then–presidential candidate Pete Buttigieg held a campaign rally in the Exeter High School cafeteria; he was introduced by actor Kevin Costner.

== Notable alumni ==
- Lloyd Ahlquist (born 1977), comedian, class of 1995
- Victoria Arlen (born 1994), paralympian swimmer
- Matty Cardarople (born 1983), actor and comedian
- Troy Duffy (born 1971), screenwriter
- Hunter Long (born 1998), football player
- Cody Morissette (born 2000), baseball player
- Joseph Petroski (1920–2010), collegiate ice hockey head coach
- Ben Malgeri (born 2000) Major League Baseball player
- Ted Kucharski (1907–1992) NFL Player

== Student newspaper ==
The Talon, also known as EHS Press, is the school's independent student newspaper founded in 1957. In the summer of 2014, The Talon switched to an on-line platform after school administrators cut the journalism class.
