= Windham High School (New Hampshire) =

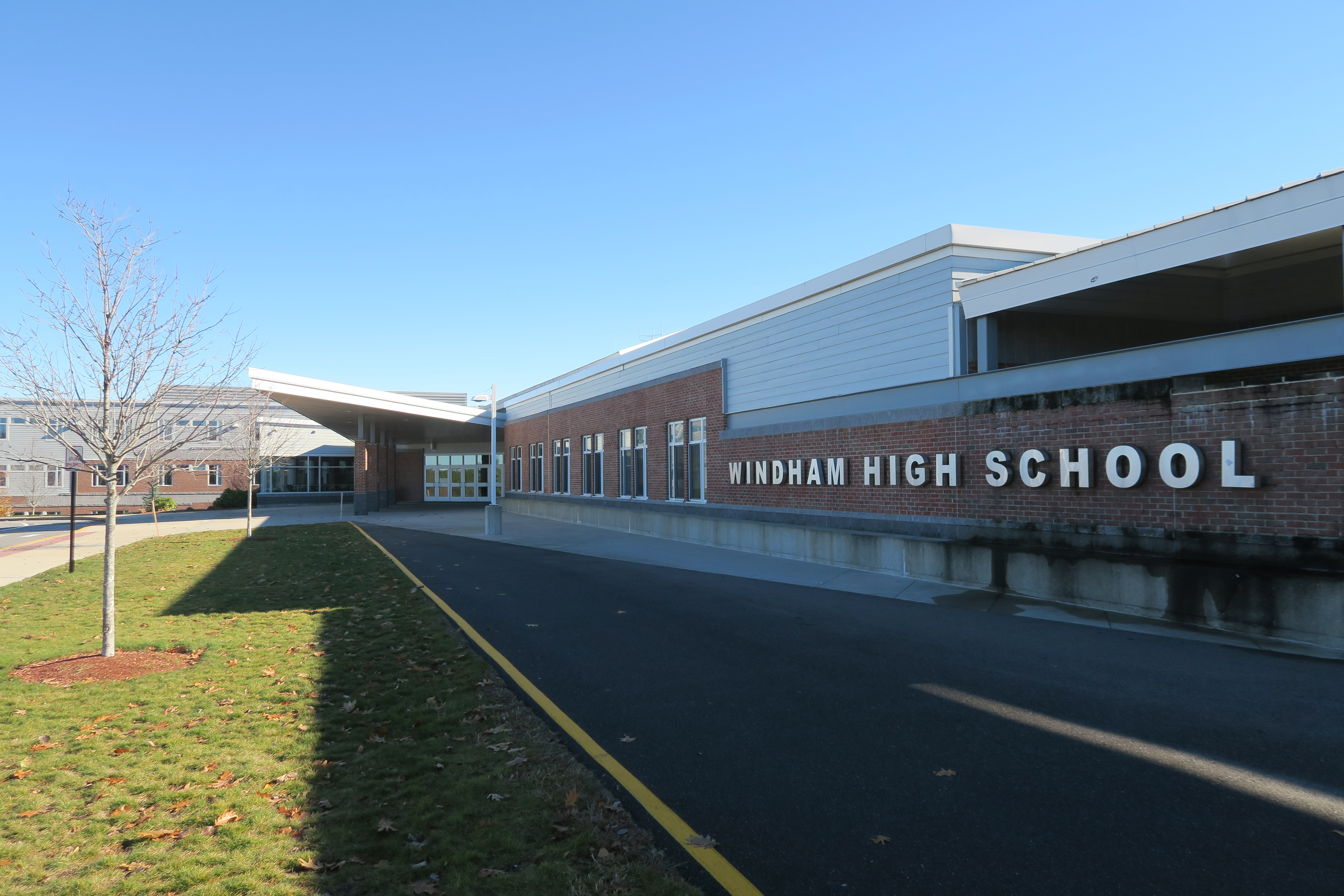

Location
- 64 London Bridge Rd; Windham, New Hampshire 03087; United States; 42°47′42″N 71°19′19″W

Information
- Type: Public high school
- Established: 2009
- Principal: Shannan McKenna
- Grades: 9–12
- Enrollment: 992 (2023–2024)
- Campus: Rural
- Colors: Navy and Gold
- Athletics conference: NHIAA
- Sports: 29
- Mascot: Jaguar
- Athletic Director: Jon Hall
- Website: whs.windhamsd.org

Windham High School is a public high school in the town of Windham, New Hampshire. The high school was established in 2009, and the first graduating class was in 2012. It serves students from grades 9 to 12 and is part of School Administration Unit (SAU) 95. The school is led by Principal Shannan McKenna.

== Academics ==
Windham High School offers a comprehensive curriculum that includes a variety of Advanced Placement (AP) courses, honors classes, and specialized programs.

=== Extracurricular Activities ===
==== Academic and Science ====
- National Honor Society: Recognizes outstanding high school students who demonstrate excellence in the areas of scholarship, leadership, service, and character.
- STEAM Programs: Focuses on science, technology, engineering, arts, and mathematics, encouraging students to explore these fields through hands-on projects and collaboration.
- Robotics: Offers students the opportunity to design, build, and program robots for various competitions.

==== Arts and Communications ====
- Band and Chorus: Provides musical education and performance opportunities in a variety of genres.
- JagRoar: The student-run newspaper that covers school events, sports, and other topics of interest.
- Yearbook Committee: Responsible for creating and publishing the annual yearbook, capturing memories and milestones of the school year.

==== Clubs and Societies ====
- Student Council: Offers leadership opportunities and a chance to influence school policies and activities.
- Various Clubs: Including culture magazine, arts association, and more, catering to diverse interests and hobbies.

== Athletics ==
Windham High School is home to the Windham Jaguars, with navy and gold as their school colors. The school has a robust athletics program, offering a variety of sports for both boys and girls. These include:

- Baseball and Softball
- Basketball
- Cross Country (M&W)
- Football
- Golf
- Ice Hockey
- Lacrosse (Boys & Girls)
- Soccer
- Swimming
- Tennis
- Track and Field
- Volleyball

The school has seen success in various sports, with teams frequently competing in state championships and earning district titles. The Jaguars are known for their competitive teams and sportsmanship. Part of athletics at Windham High School is "learning the value of giving back". WHS athletics hosts a Blackout Cancer week each fall to raise funds for those affected by cancer and other related diseases, and in the winter WHS hosts Warrior Week to give back to our veterans, in relation to the Wounded Warrior Project. With their Athletic Director Bill Raycraft, now at Malden Catholic, the school became the first school to host the Project Blackout event. Now in 2024, four high schools in New England participate in a football fundraiser event to raise money for cancer, with over 18,000 t-shirts being sold for the cause. Bishop Guertin High School (Nashua, NH), Pelham High School, and Malden Catholic have all joined in annual Blackout Fundraiser in recent years.

Despite being a young high school, Windham High School boasts multiple NHIAA State Championships.

- 55 INDIVIDUAL STATE CHAMPIONS
- 41 TEAM STATE CHAMPIONS
- 23 State Final Appearances
- 3 MEET OF CHAMPIONS

=== Team State Champions ===
==== Wrestling (6) ====
- 2011-2012 (DIII), 2012-2013 (DIII), 2013-2014 (DIII), 2015-2016 (DII), 2016-2017 (DII), 2017-2018 (DII)

==== Girls Lacrosse (4) ====
- 2012 (DIII), 2013 (DIII), 2015 (DII), 2024 (DII)

==== Cheerleading (12) ====
- 2015 (Fall DII)
- 2016 (Winter DII)
- 2016 (Fall DII)
- 2017 (Winter DII)
- 2017 (Fall DII)
- 2020 (Fall DII)
- 2021 (Fall DII)
- 2022 (Winter DII)
- 2022 (Fall DII)
- 2023 (Winter DII)
- 2023 (Fall DII)
- 2024 (Winter DII)

==== Soccer (3): ====
- 2012 (DII), 2013 (DII), 2020 (DI)

==== Field Hockey (5) ====
- 2013 (DII)
- 2016 (DII)
- 2017 (DII)
- 2019 (DI)
- 2020 (DI)

==== Girls Volleyball (3) ====
- 2014 (DII), 2016 (DII), 2017 (DII)

==== Football (1) ====
- 2014 (DII)

==== Baseball (1) ====
- 2015 (DII)

==== Golf (3) ====
- 2013 (DII)
- 2016 (DII)
- 2023 (DII)

==== Ice Hockey (1) ====
- 2015-2016 (DII)

==== Girls Tennis (1) ====
- 2017 (DII)

==== Track & Field (1) ====
- 2017-2018 (Indoor DII)

==== Swimming (2) ====
- 2023 (DII)
- 2024 (DII)

==== Volleyball (1) ====
- 2021 (DI)

== Community and Culture ==
Various events and activities throughout the year.
