= Lincoln Woodstock Cooperative School District =

School district in the United States

Address
- 72 Linwood Drive Lincoln, New Hampshire, 03251; United States

District information
- Type: Public primary and secondary
- Grades: K–12
- NCES District ID: 3304260

Students and staff
- Enrollment: 283 (2020-2021)
- Faculty: 24
- Student–teacher ratio: 7.11
- District mascot: lumberjacks
- Colors: Red, Black, and White

Other information
- Website: www.lin-wood.org

The Lincoln Woodstock Cooperative School District is a comprehensive community public school district in Lincoln, New Hampshire, United States, that serves students from kindergarten through 12th grade.

Lin-Wood Public School serves the communities of Lincoln and Woodstock, New Hampshire. The name Lin-Wood is a portmanteau of (Lin)coln and (Wood)stock, the two towns of the district.

== Administration ==
- Principal - Mark Pribbernow
- Assistant Principal - Michael Weaver

== Awards ==
The Middle School was named New Hampshire's Northwest Regional Middle School of Excellence by the New Hampshire Excellence in Education Awards Program in 1995, 1996 and 1997.

== Academics ==
The May 2006 NHEIAP educational assessment report showed the school's high-school aged children performed above state averages in both math and reading.

As of 2005, Lin-wood had 96 students in grades 9–12.

- White (95.4%)
- Asian (3.7%)
- African-American (0.9%)
