= Cody Morissette =

American baseball player (born 2000)

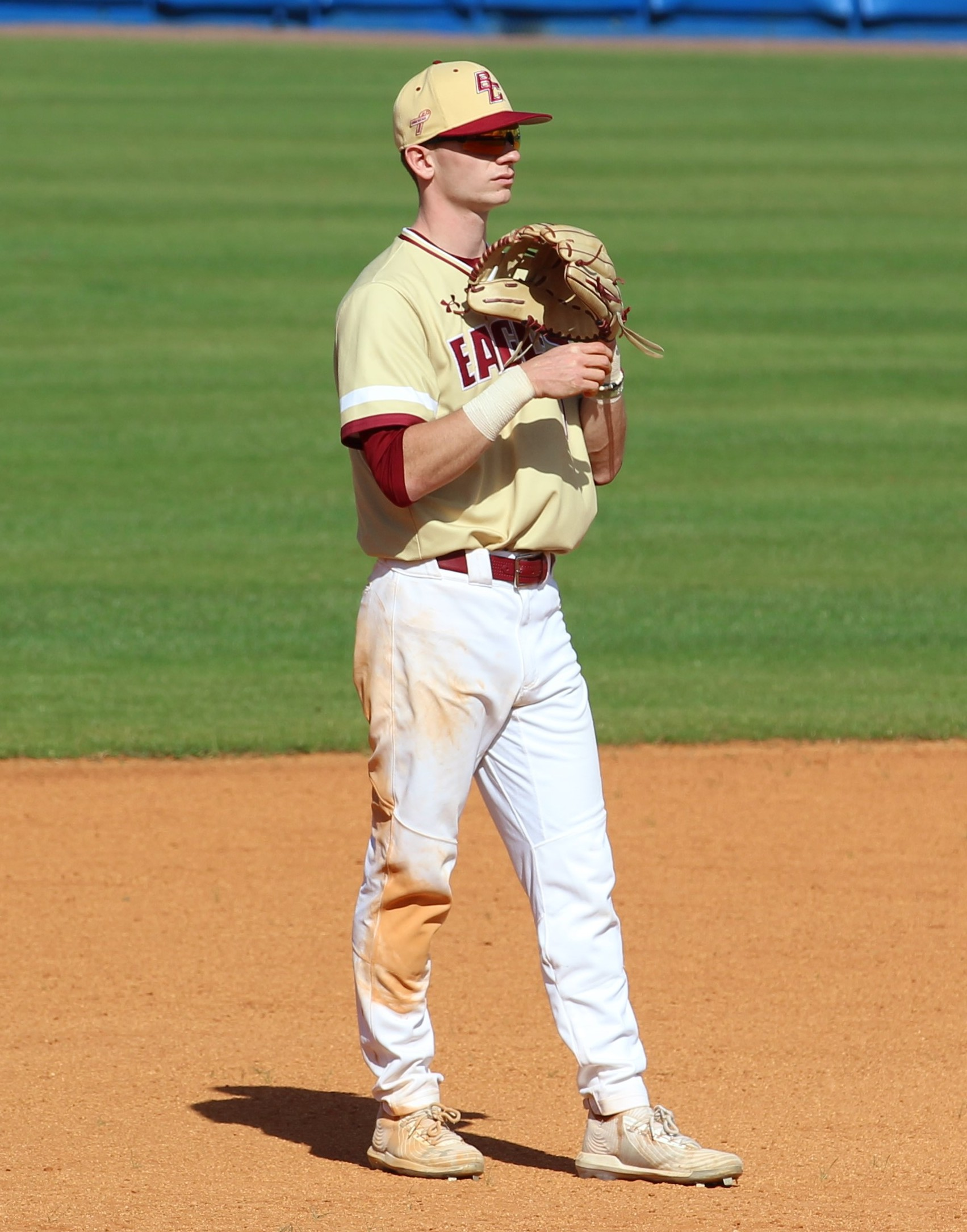
- Morissette playing for Boston College in 2020

Minnesota Twins
- Second baseman / Third baseman
- Born: January 16, 2000 (age 26); Manchester, New Hampshire, U.S.
- Bats: Left Throws: Right

Cody Hodsdon Morissette (born January 16, 2000) is an American professional baseball second baseman in the Minnesota Twins organization.

== Early life and amateur career ==
Morissette grew up in Exeter, New Hampshire, and attended Exeter High School, where he was an All-State selection in football, basketball and baseball. He was named the New Hampshire Division I Baseball Player of the Year as a junior and as a senior he was named New Hampshire's Mr. Basketball. Morissette had 99 career hits and compiled a 19–1 win–loss record with a 1.21 earned run average (ERA) as a pitcher over four seasons.

Morissette played college baseball for the Boston College Eagles. He started all 58 of the Eagles' games as a second baseman during his freshman season in 2019 and finished the season with .320 batting average with 20 doubles, four home runs, 41 runs batted in (RBIs) and 27 runs scored. He was named second team All-Atlantic Coast Conference (ACC) and to the ACC All-Freshman team as well as a Third Team All-American by Collegiate Baseball News and a Freshman All-American by Baseball America, Collegiate Baseball News and Perfect Game. After the season, Morissette played collegiate summer baseball for the Bourne Braves of the Cape Cod Baseball League, where he batted .252 and was named a West Division All-Star.

As a sophomore, Morissette batted .448 with six doubles and two home runs in 15 games before the season was cut short due to the coronavirus pandemic. He played summer baseball for the North Shore Navigators in the Futures Collegiate Baseball League. In his junior season with Boston College, Morissette batted .321 with six home runs and 33 RBIs and was named first team All-ACC.

== Professional career ==
Morissette was selected with the 52nd overall pick in the 2021 Major League Baseball draft by the Miami Marlins. He signed with the Marlins on July 23 with a signing bonus of approximately $1.4 million. Morissette was assigned to the Low-A Jupiter Hammerheads to start his professional career. Over 34 games and 134 at-bats, he slashed .204/.308/.299 with one home run, ten RBIs, and eight doubles.

On June 2, 2026, the Marlins released Morissette. On June 8, he signed a minor league contract with the Minnesota Twins and was subsequently assigned to the Wichita Wind Surge.
