= Pelham High School (New Hampshire) =

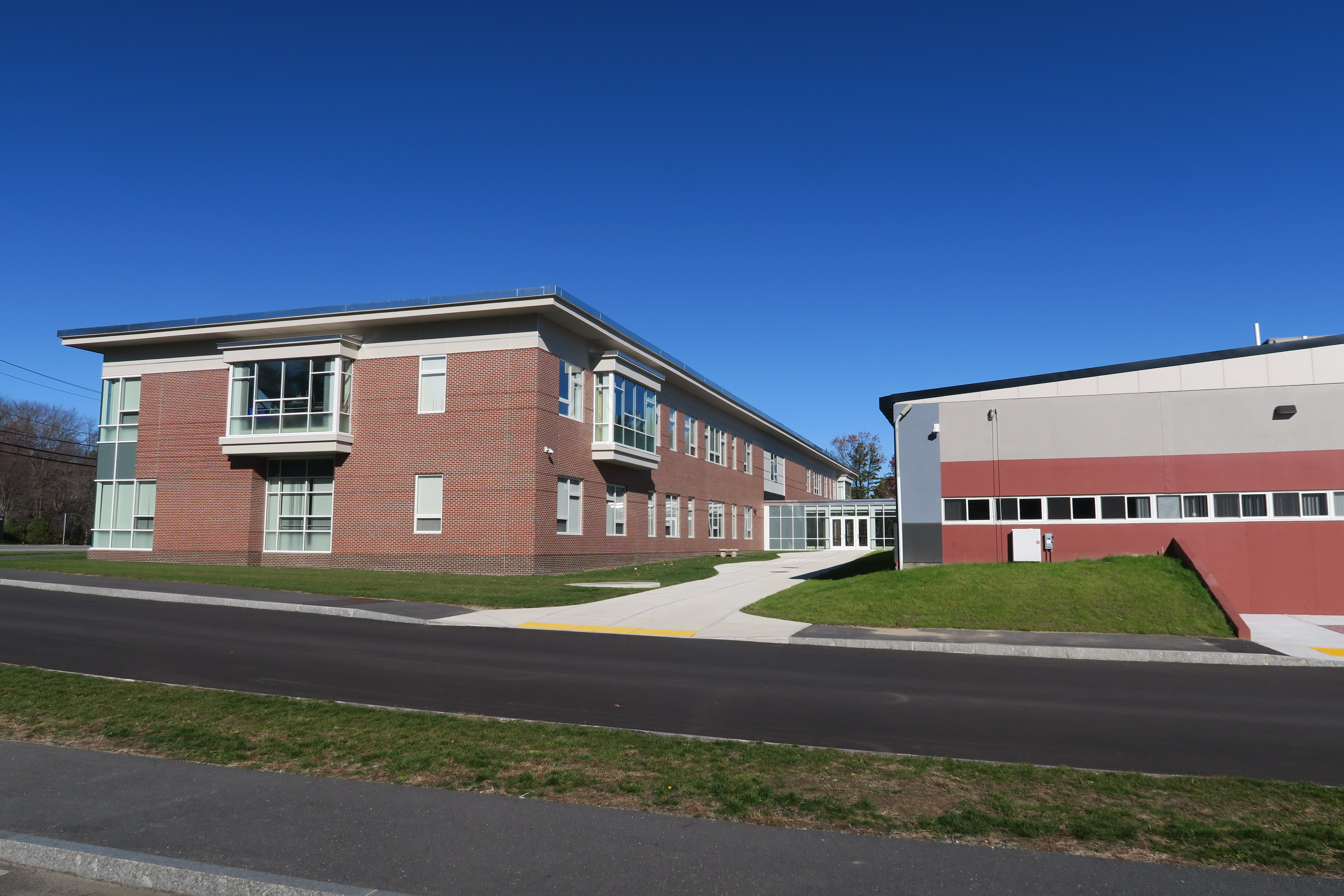
- Pelham High School

Location
- 85 Marsh Rd; Pelham, New Hampshire 03076; United States; 42°43′22″N 71°19′54″W

Information
- Type: Public high school
- Motto: Pelham Proud
- Established: 1974
- Superintendent: Chip McGee
- CEEB code: 300482
- Principal: N/A
- Teaching staff: 51.00 (FTE)
- Grades: 9–12
- Enrollment: 556 (2023–2024)
- Student to teacher ratio: 10.90
- Campus: Suburban
- Colors: Blue and white
- Athletics conference: NHIAA; Division II
- Mascot: Python
- Rivals: Windham High School; Alvirne High School
- Accreditation: NEASC
- Feeder schools: Pelham Memorial School
- Website: Pelham High School

Pelham High School is a high school in Pelham, New Hampshire. It is part of School Administrative Unit (SAU) 28, and is administered by the Pelham School District. During the 2016–17 school year, it had 655 students.

== Athletics ==
Pelham High School is a NHIAA-governed school, and offers a three-season interscholastic athletic program for students to join. Additionally, Pelham High School has received numerous awards for athletic achievement, including a Mr. New Hampshire Basketball award in 2016, as well as a 2015-16 Gatorade New Hampshire Boys Basketball Player of the Year that same year.

=== Fall ===
- Boys' cross country
- Girls' cross country
- Field hockey
- Football
- Boys' soccer
- Girls' soccer
- Spirit team
- Volleyball

=== Winter ===
- Boys' basketball
- Girls' basketball
- Gymnastics (club)
- Ice hockey (club)
- Boys' indoor track
- Girls' indoor track
- Swim (club)
- Wrestling

=== Spring ===
- Baseball
- Boys' lacrosse
- Girls' lacrosse
- Softball
- Boys' tennis
- Girls' tennis
- Boys' track and field
- Girls' track and field

== Clubs and activities ==
Pelham High School offers a wide array of clubs, activities, and honor societies for students to be involved in throughout the year. A club fair is held once a year in September to promote various clubs, and to persuade students to sign up. Honor societies are available to juniors and seniors only. The full list is as follows:

- Art Club
- Be the Change
- Creative Writing Club
- Drama Club
- Future Business Leaders of America
- Fellowship of Christian Athletes
- Gay / Straight Alliance
- Hiking Club
- LARP Club
- Math Honor Society
- Minecraft Club
- National Art Honor Society
- National English Honor Society
- National Honor Society
- National Science Honor Society
- Psychology Club
- Recycling Club
- Robotics Club
- Science Club
- Spanish National Honor Society
- Technology Honor Society
- Trivia Club

== Demographics ==
The demographic breakdown of the 655 students enrolled for the 2016–2017 school year was:

- Male - 51.9%
- Female - 48.1%
- Native American/Alaskan - 0.2%
- Asian/Pacific Islander - 1.5%
- Black - 0.8%
- Hispanic - 1.4%
- White - 92.7%
- Multiracial - 3.5%

== Notable alumni ==
- Nick Groff, executive producer of Ghost Adventures TV series
- Richard M. Linnehan, veterinarian, NASA astronaut
