= Merrimack School District =

School district in New Hampshire, United States

Merrimack School District is a school district headquartered in Merrimack, New Hampshire. It is not to be confused with the Merrimack Valley School District in Merrimack County, which serves Penacook, Boscawen, Loudon, Webster, and Salisbury.

== History ==
In the 1995–96 school year, the district enacted a policy against talking about LGBT issues, called "Prohibition of Alternative Lifestyle Instruction." This resulted in student protests and discord among Merrimack residents. The policy affected how teachers at Merrimack High School taught about literary figures; as of May 1996 the school district had not placed measures against teachers related to this policy. The school board ended the policy effective the 1996–97 school year.

== Schools ==
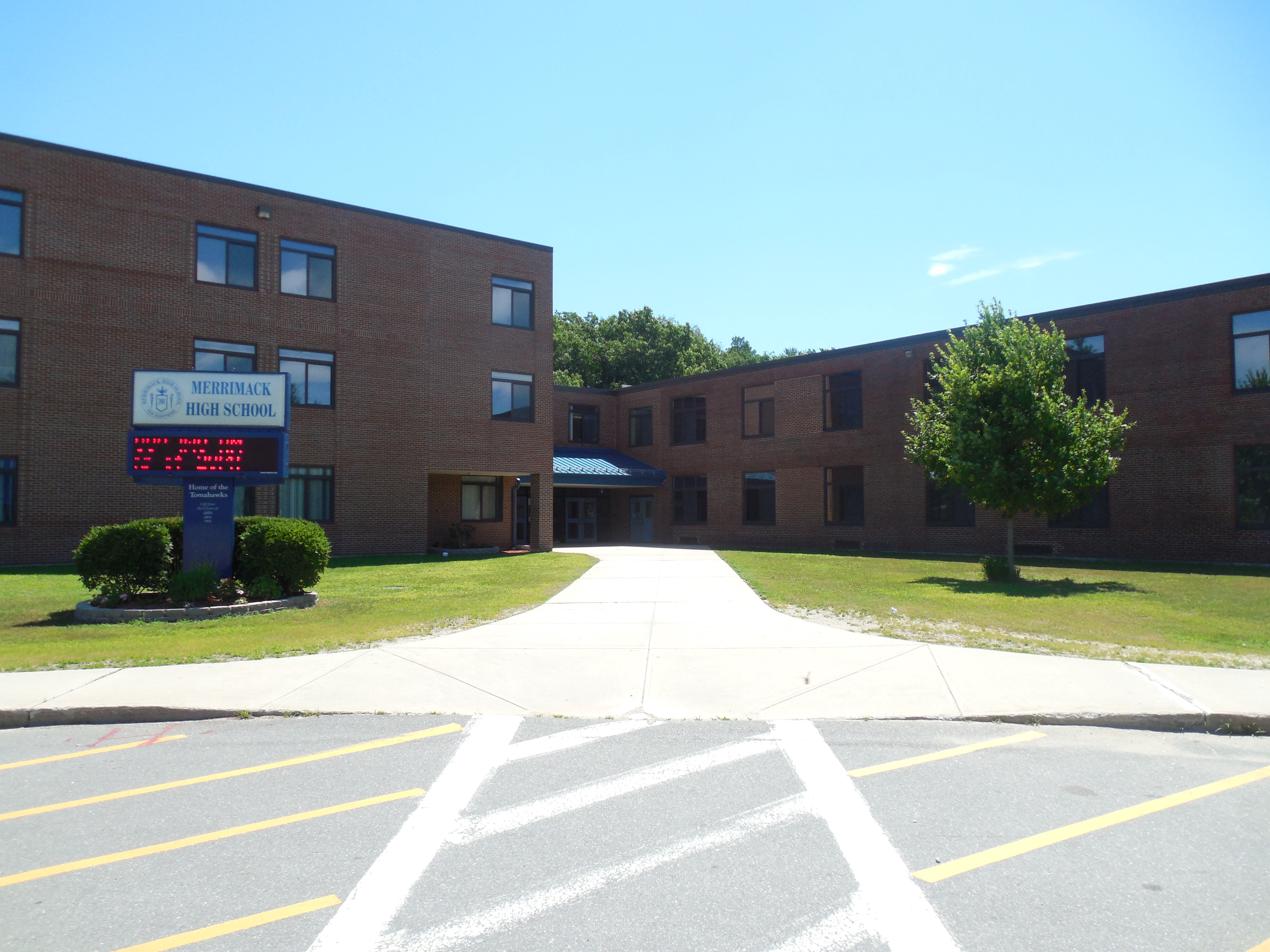
Merrimack High School

Secondary and upper elementary schools

- Merrimack High School
- Merrimack Middle School
- Mastricola Upper Elementary School

Elementary schools

- Mastricola
- Reeds Ferry
- Thorntons Ferry
