= Oyster River Cooperative School District =

School district in New Hampshire, United States

Oyster River Cooperative School District (ORCSD) is a public school district in Durham, New Hampshire, United States, serving the towns of Durham, Lee, Madbury, and Barrington. Durham is home to the main campus of the University of New Hampshire. One of the first cooperative school districts established in the state of New Hampshire in 1954, ORCSD has a history of progressive educational philosophy, including heterogenous grouping and differentiated instruction. Serving around 2,200 students, the district consists of 2 elementary schools (one each in Lee and Madbury), a middle school, and a high school. It has its own school administrative unit (SAU 5), with its own superintendent.

== Schools ==
ORCSD consists of four schools:

- Oyster River High School
- Oyster River Middle School
- Moharimet Elementary School in Madbury
- Mast Way Elementary School in Lee

== Administration ==
Interim Superintendent Suzanne Filippone and Zachary Han, 2026-present, Dr. Robert Shaps, Superintendent, 2024 - June 30th, 2026 Previously: Dr. James Morse, Sr., Superintendent

== School board ==
The school board for the Oyster River Cooperative School District consists of seven members, elected through a ballot vote in early march of each year. Serving staggered three-year terms, two members are re-elected each year for at-large seats, with three town-specific seats up for election every third year.

In 2018, the School Board voted to adopt Indigenous Peoples' Day on the second Monday of October and is now using the term Columbus Day, as mandated by NH House Bill 1014.
