= Pelham, New Hampshire =

- Town
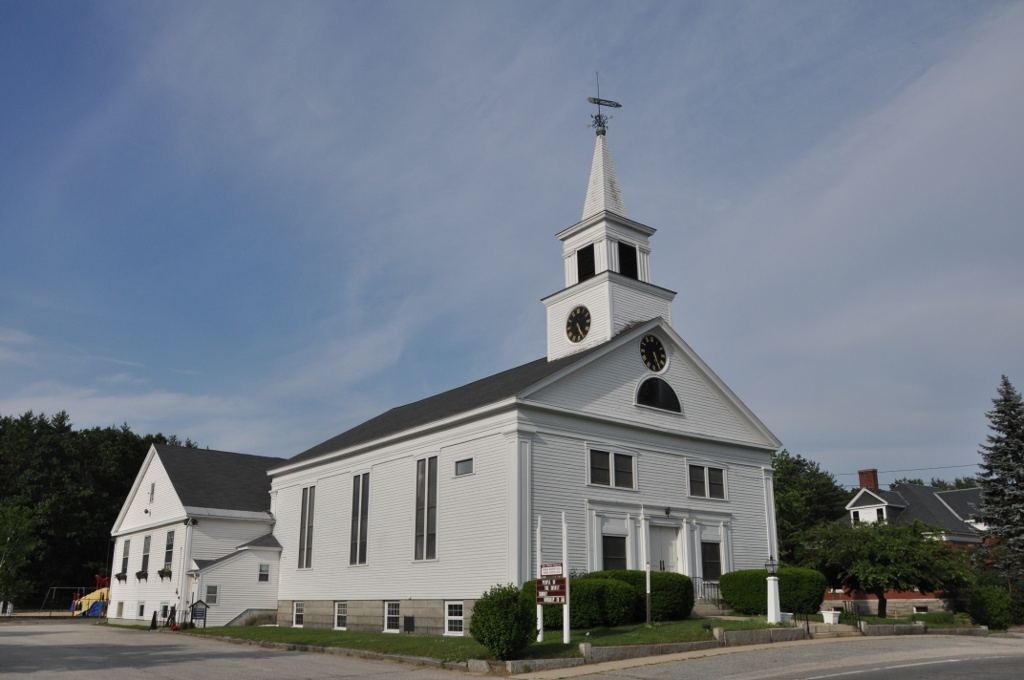
- The Congregational church in the town center

- Seal

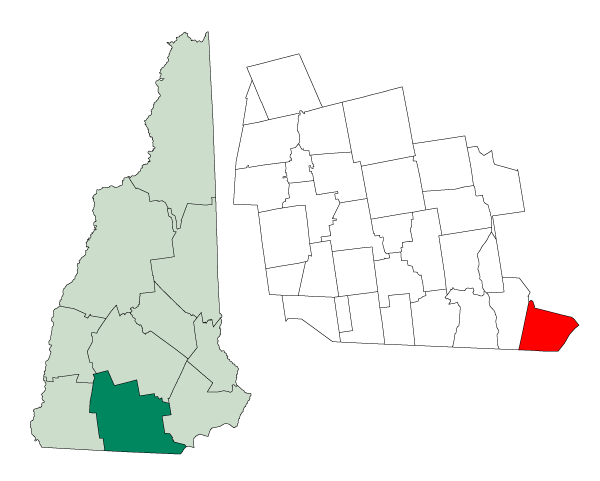
- Location in Hillsborough County, New Hampshire
- Coordinates: 42°44′4″N 71°19′28″W
- Country: United States
- State: New Hampshire
- County: Hillsborough
- Incorporated: 1746
- Named for: Thomas Pelham-Holles, 1st Duke of Newcastle
- Villages: Pelham; North Pelham

Government
  - Board of Selectmen: Jason Croteau, Chair; Heather Corbett, Vice Chair; Charlene Takesian; Jaie Bergeron; Danielle Masse Quinn
  - Town Administrator: Joseph A. Roark

Area
  - Total: 26.9 sq mi (69.6 km^{2})
  - Land: 26.3 sq mi (68.2 km^{2})
  - Water: 0.54 sq mi (1.4 km^{2}) 2.01%
- Elevation: 154 ft (47 m)

Population (2020)
  - Total: 14,222
  - Density: 540/sq mi (208.4/km^{2})
- Time zone: UTC−5 (Eastern)
  - Summer (DST): UTC−4 (Eastern)
- ZIP code: 03076
- Area code: 603
- FIPS code: 33-59940
- GNIS feature ID: 0873695
- Website: www.pelhamweb.com

Pelham /ˈpɛləm/ is a town in Hillsborough County, New Hampshire, United States. The population was 14,222 at the 2020 census, up from 12,897 at the 2010 census. Pelham is a part of the Merrimack Valley.

== History ==
Originally part of Lowell, Massachusetts, Pelham was split from Old Dunstable in 1741, when the border between Massachusetts and New Hampshire was settled. It was incorporated in 1746. The town is named after Thomas Pelham-Holles, 1st Duke of Newcastle.

== Geography ==
Pelham is in southern New Hampshire, in the southeastern corner of Hillsborough County. It is New Hampshire's southernmost town, and the easternmost in the county. It is 7 miles (11 km) north of Lowell, Massachusetts, 9 miles (14 km) west of Lawrence, Massachusetts, and 9 miles east of Nashua, New Hampshire. Pelham contains the southernmost point in the state of New Hampshire, at 42°41′49″N 71°17′40″W, a location known as the "Old Boundary Pine", named for a pine tree that marked the difference in definition of the northern boundary of Massachusetts. This point is 3 miles (5 km) due north of Pawtucket Falls in Lowell, and marks the point where the straight-line border to the west meets the 3-mile buffer defined by the Merrimack River.

According to the U.S. Census Bureau, the town of Pelham has a total area of 26.9 square miles (69.6 km^{2}), of which 26.3 square miles (68.2 km^{2}) are land and 0.54 square miles (1.4 km^{2}), or 2.01%, are water. Nearly all of the town is drained by Beaver Brook, which flows south to the Merrimack River in Lowell, Massachusetts. Small sections of town along its eastern border are drained by other minor tributaries of the Merrimack. The highest point in Pelham is Jeremy Hill, at 577 feet (176 m) above sea level near the town's western border.

== Demographics ==
Historical population
Census	Pop.	Note	%±
1790	791		—
1800	918		16.1%
1810	998		8.7%
1820	1,040		4.2%
1830	1,070		2.9%
1840	1,003		−6.3%
1850	1,071		6.8%
1860	944		−11.9%
1870	861		−8.8%
1880	848		−1.5%
1890	791		−6.7%
1900	875		10.6%
1910	826		−5.6%
1920	974		17.9%
1930	814		−16.4%
1940	979		20.3%
1950	1,317		34.5%
1960	2,605		97.8%
1970	5,408		107.6%
1980	8,090		49.6%
1990	9,408		16.3%
2000	10,914		16.0%
2010	12,897		18.2%
2020	14,222		10.3%
2024 (est.)	14,685		3.3%
U.S. Decennial Census

The earliest census data shows the town of Pelham having a population of 543 residents in 1767.

As of the census of 2000, there were 10,914 people, 3,606 households, and 2,982 families residing in the town. The population density was 412.9 inhabitants per square mile (159.4/km^{2}). There were 3,740 housing units at an average density of 141.5 per square mile (54.6/km^{2}). The racial makeup of the town was:

- 97.34% White (U.S. average: 75.1%)
- 0.44% African American (U.S. average: 12.3%)
- 0.22% Native American (U.S. average: 0.1%)
- 1.04% Asian (U.S. average: 3.6%)
- 0.25% from other races (U.S. average: 5.5%)
- 0.71% from two or more races (U.S. average: 2.4%)

Hispanic or Latino of any race were 0.96% of the population. (U.S. average: 12.5%)

In 2000, there were 3,606 households, with an average household size of 3.03 and an average family size of 3.33.

- 43.6% of households had children under the age of 18 living with them. (U.S. average: 32.8%)
- 71.8% were married couples living together. (U.S. average: 51.7%)
- 7.5% had a female householder with no husband present. (U.S. average: 12.2%)
- 17.3% were non-families. (U.S. average: 31.9%)
- 12.9% of all households were made up of individuals. (U.S. average: 25.8%)
- 5.7% had someone living alone who was 65 years of age or older. (U.S. average: 9.2%)

In 2000, the town's population had a median age of 36 years (U.S. average: 35.3).

- 28.9% under the age of 18
- 6.1% from 18 to 24
- 34.0% from 25 to 44
- 23.2% from 45 to 64
- 7.8% who were 65 years of age or older

For every 100 females, there were 98.8 males. For every 100 females age 18 and over, there were 99.3 males.

The median income for a household in the town was $68,608. (U.S. average: $41,994). The median income for a family was $73,365. (U.S. average: $50,046). Males had a median income of $47,685 versus $33,375 for females. The per capita income for the town was $25,158. About 1.6% of families (U.S. average: 9.2%) and 3.0% of the population (U.S. average: 12.4%) were below the poverty line, including 3.1% of those under age 18 and 4.7% of those age 65 or over.

== Education ==
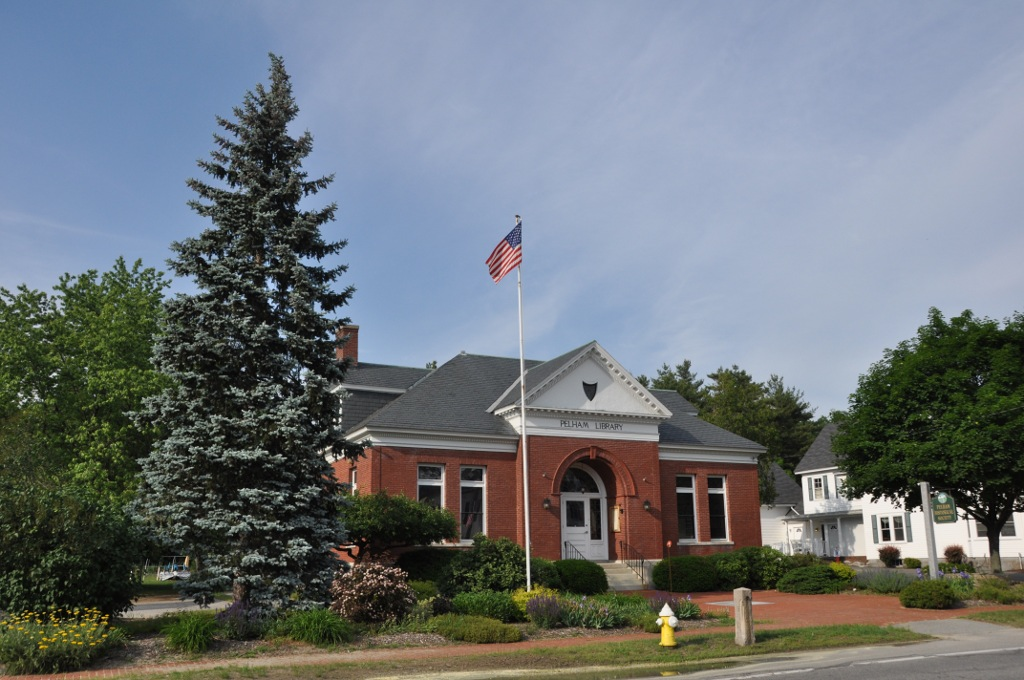
The Pelham Library and Memorial Building, now home to the local historical society

Public schools are managed by the Pelham School District, School Administrative Unit #28, whose boundaries are coterminous with the boundaries of the town. The district is committed to its vision to "inspire success one mind at a time." The superintendent is Dr. Chip McGee.

The schools in the district are:

- Pelham Elementary School
- Pelham Memorial School
- Pelham High School

St. Patrick School was at one time a parochial school in the town.

== Pelham government ==
Pelham is governed by a board of selectmen:

- Jason Croteau, Chair (2028)
- Heather Corbett, Vice-chair (2026)
- Charlene Takesian (2026)
- Jaie Bergeron (2026)
- Danielle Masse Quinn (2028)

Town Administrator: Joseph A. Roark

== Transportation ==
Pelham is crossed by three New Hampshire state routes:

- NH 38
- NH 111A
- NH 128

== Parks ==
=== Muldoon Park ===
The park is located northwest of the center of Pelham at 305 Mammoth Road (NH 128), just north of Nashua Road. The park's land area is surrounded by NH 128, two roads that branch off it, and a minor road which intersects NH 111A.

Muldoon Park offers many short walking trails, four variously sized baseball fields (ranging from t-ball to official), a soccer field, and a play area. Most of the trails lead to the park's two ponds, local roads and houses or to Beaver Brook, a small river. The town of Pelham completed an 18-hole disc golf course here, stretching over a quarter-mile, in September 2007.

The Pelham Parks and Recreation department has recently added two non-official sized baseball fields to the southwest corner of the park.

There is now an 18-hole disc golf course at this park, that includes a spot to hold gatherings. Many players from surrounding towns enjoy a round of disc golf set in the woods adjacent to the sport fields.

== Notable people ==
- Josiah Butler (1779–1854), US congressman
- Sean Caisse (born 1986), stock car driver
- Ray Fox (1916–2014), crew chief and owner with NASCAR
- Daniel Gage (1828–1901), the "Ice King of Lowell"; family for whom Gage Hill is named
- Nick Groff (born 1980), paranormal investigator; graduate of Pelham High School (1999)
- Richard M. Linnehan (born 1957), astronaut (NASA); graduate of Pelham High School (1975)
- Caroline Harvey (born 2002), professional women's ice hockey player
- Charlene Takesian, politician
