= Merrimack High School =

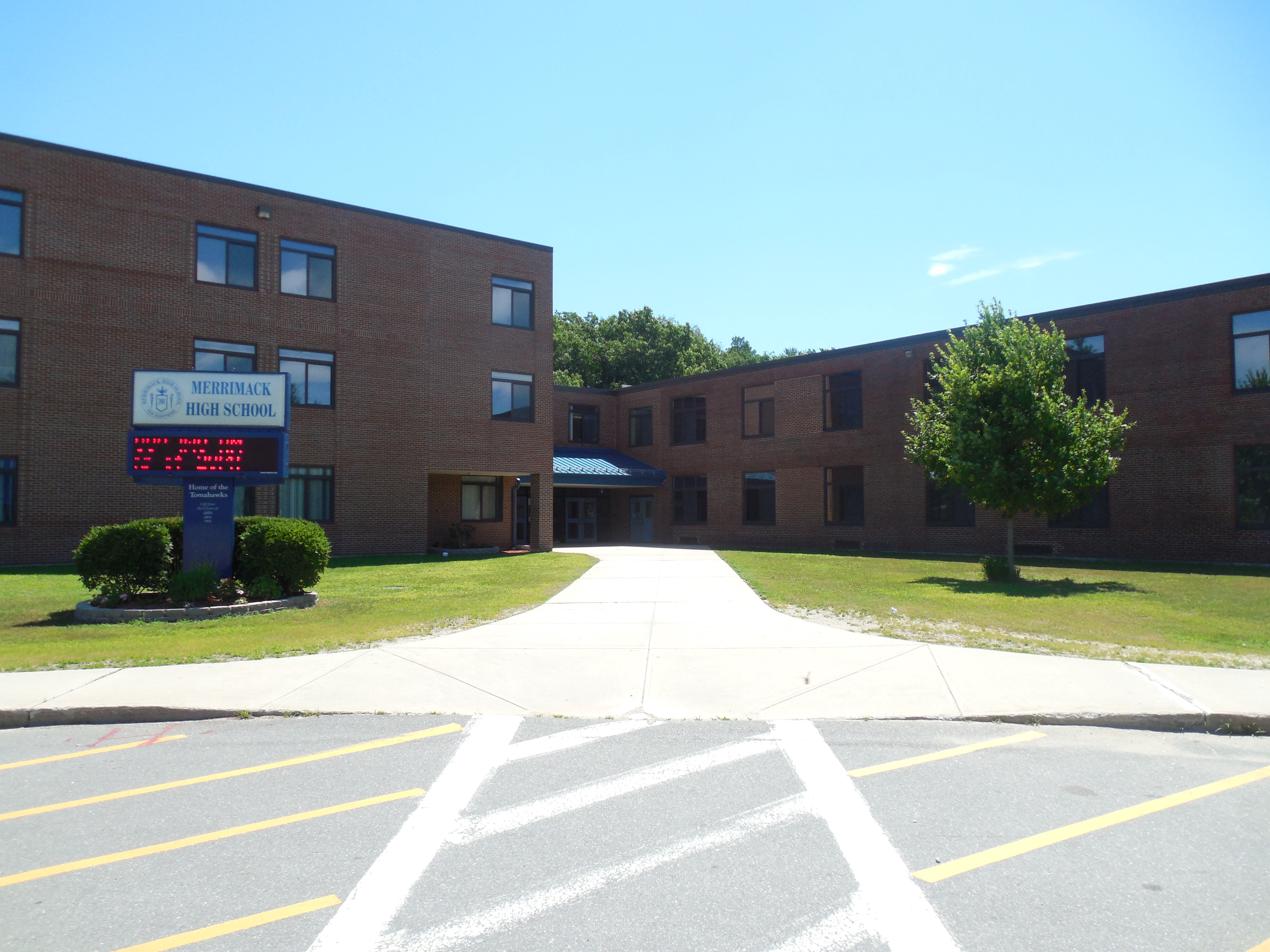
- Merrimack High School

Location
- 38 McElwain Street; Merrimack, New Hampshire; United States; 42°51′39″N 71°29′53″W

Information
- Type: Public
- Motto: Believe, Go Forward, and Inspire
- School district: Merrimack School District
- Principal: Stephen Claire
- Faculty: 98.80 (on FTE basis)
- Grades: 9 to 12
- Enrollment: 1,200 (2017-18)
- Student to teacher ratio: 12.15
- Colors: Royal blue and white
- Mascot: Tomahawk
- Nickname: Tomahawks
- Website: mhs.sau26.org

Merrimack High School (MHS) is the public secondary school of the town of Merrimack, New Hampshire. It is located in a central area of town on 38 McElwain Street. About 1,200 students from grades 9 through 12 are enrolled in the school. It is a part of the Merrimack School District.

The principal is Stephen Claire. Former principal Kenneth W. Johnson adopted the motto "Believe, go forward, and inspire" for the school.

== History ==
In the 1995-1996 school year, the district enacted a policy against talking about LGBT issues, called "Prohibition of Alternative Lifestyle Instruction." The policy affected how teachers at Merrimack High taught about literary figures; as of May 1996 the school district had not placed measures against teachers related to this policy. The school board ended the policy effective the 1996-1997 school year.

== Academics ==
NE-CAP results from the 11th grade class at MHS showed that 64% of the students were proficient in reading, 33% were proficient in writing, and 27% were proficient in math, giving it a "GreatSchools" rating of 4 out of 10. In 2018, 271 students participated in the SAT exams and averaged scores of 530 on the reading/writing portion and 520 on the math portion. Furthermore, about 85% of graduates attended a college, 10% went straight to employment, and about 4% joined the armed forces, leaving 1% undecided of the 286 graduates.

== Extracurricular activities ==
Merrimack High School offers a variety of clubs and activities for the students to participate in.

=== Athletics ===
The athletics teams from Merrimack High School are called the "Tomahawks", which are sometimes nicknamed the "Hawks". The school colors are royal blue and white. The school has teams for basketball, baseball, bowling, cheerleading, cross country, field hockey, football, golf, gymnastics, ice hockey, lacrosse, soccer, softball, swimming, tennis, track and field, and wrestling.

Non-competitive athletic extracurricular activities include archery, hiking/outdoors, and ski/snowboard club.

=== Artistic activities ===
Artistic extracurricular activities include marching/concert band, jazz band, chorus, dance, photography, videography, ceramics/sculpture, drawing/painting, broadcast, and theater. The MHS videography department is notable for its yearly student-run spoof productions, such as "Matrix High School" and "Star Sports".

=== Science, Technology, Engineering, and Math (STEM) activities ===
STEM activities include FIRST Robotics Competition team, math team, Science Olympiad

=== Student engagement and academic extracurricular activities ===
Student engagement and academic extracurricular activities include Academy of Finance, environmental awareness, financial literacy, games (separate video and non- video games club), Gay-Straight alliance, heath club, Interact club, Merrimack Mentors, Model UN, newspaper, Quiz Bowl, and the National Art Honors Society chapter #2538.

== Notable alumni ==
- Mickey Gasper (class of 2014), Major League Baseball player, Boston Red Sox
- Matthew Kalish (class of 2000), co-founder of DraftKings
- Tim Schaller (class of 2009), National Hockey League player, Los Angeles Kings
