= Pelham School District =

School district in New Hampshire, United States

Address
- 59a Marsh Road Pelham, New Hampshire, 03076; United States

District information
- Type: Public school district
- Grades: K–12
- Superintendent: Chip McGee
- NCES District ID: 3305550

Students and staff
- Students: 1,743 (2020-2021)
- Student–teacher ratio: 12.19

Other information
- Website: www.pelhamsd.org

Pelham School District (School Administrative Unit #28) is a school district headquartered in Pelham, New Hampshire, in the United States.

== School board ==
The Pelham School Board contains five members each serving a three-year term as of election day.

The 2024 School Board members are (Term expiration)

- Troy Bressette, Chair (2025)
- G. David Wilkerson, Vice-Chair (2025)
- Darlene Greenwood (2026)
- Rebecca Cummings (2027)
- Garrett Abare (2027)
- School District Treasurer
  - Arlanna Garcia (2026)
- School District Clerk
  - Danielle Pilato (2026)
- School District Moderator
  - Doug Vincent (2027)
- School Board Secretary
  - Matthew Sullivan

== Schools ==
- Pelham High School
- Pelham Memorial School
- Pelham Elementary School
